= Chen Mei-ling =

Taiwanese politician

- 陳美伶
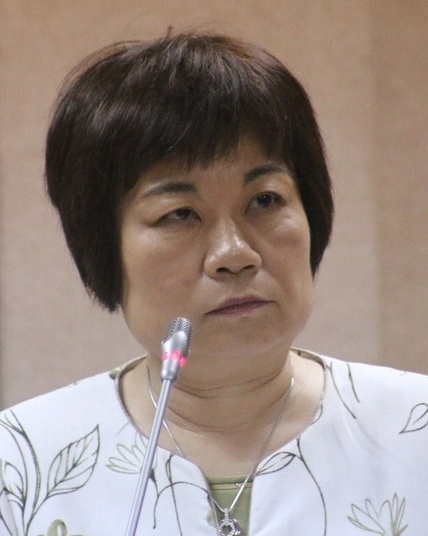

Minister of National Development Council of the Republic of China
- In office 8 September 2017 – 19 May 2020
- Deputy: Chiou Jiunn-rong, Tseng Shu-cheng, Kao Shien-quey
- Preceded by: Chen Tain-jy
- Succeeded by: Kung Ming-hsin

Secretary-General of the Executive Yuan
- In office 20 May 2016 – 7 September 2017
- Premier: Lin Chuan
- Deputy: Ho Pei-shan, Shih Keh-her, Sung Yu-hsieh
- Preceded by: Chien Tai-lang
- Succeeded by: Cho Jung-tai

Deputy Secretary-General of the Executive Yuan
- In office 2006–2008
- Secretary-General: Liu Yuh-san; Chen Chin-jun

Personal details
- Born: 1958 (age 67–68)
- Education: National Chengchi University (LLB, PhD); National Taiwan University (LLM)

Chen Mei-ling (Chinese: 陳美伶; pinyin: Chén Měilíng; born 1958) is a Taiwanese legal scholar. She was the Minister of National Development Council in 2017–2020 and the Secretary-General of the Executive Yuan in 2016-2017.

== Education ==
Chen graduated from National Chengchi University with a Bachelor of Laws (LL.B.) in 1980 and earned a Master of Laws (LL.M.) from National Taiwan University in 1984. She then returned to National Chengchi University and earned her Ph.D. in law in 1995. Her doctoral dissertation, completed under professor Dai Dong-xiong, was titled, "Legislative norms for artificial reproduction" (Chinese: 人工生殖之立法規范).

== Political career ==
Chen was deputy secretary general of the Executive Yuan from 2006 to 2008. She returned to the cabinet in 2016 as secretary-general under premier Lin Chuan. Chen became minister of the National Development Council in September 2017, and was later awarded an Order of Brilliant Star. She resigned from the National Development Council on 14 May 2020.
