= Sung Yu-hsieh =

Taiwanese politician

- 宋餘俠

Deputy Secretary-General of the Executive Yuan
- Incumbent
- Assumed office 13 August 2014 Serving with Ho Pei-shan
- Secretary-General: Lee Shih-chuan; Chien Tai-lang; Chen Mei-ling; Cho Jung-tai; Li Meng-yen
- Succeeded by: Lee Guo-shin

Deputy Minister of National Development Council of the Republic of China
- In office 22 January 2014 – 12 August 2014
- Minister: Kuan Chung-ming
- Preceded by: Position established
- Succeeded by: Kao Shien-quey

Minister of Research, Development and Evaluation Commission of the Republic of China
- In office 4 July 2012 – 21 January 2014
- Deputy: Irving H.C. Tai; Fan Chiang Tai-chi
- Preceded by: Chu Chin-peng
- Succeeded by: Position abolished

Deputy Minister of Research, Development and Evaluation Commission of the Republic of China
- In office 2008–2012
- Minister: Jiang Yi-huah; Chu Chin-peng

Personal details
- Born: 5 March 1956 (age 70)
- Education: National Chung Hsing University (BS); University of Michigan (MPP); National Chengchi University (PhD)

Sung Yu-hsieh (Chinese: 宋餘俠; pinyin: Sòng Yúxiá; born 5 March 1956) is a Taiwanese politician. He served as the Deputy Secretary-General of the Executive Yuan, beginning on 13 August 2014.

== Education ==
Sung obtained his bachelor's degree in applied mathematics from National Chung Hsing University in 1978 and earned a Master of Public Policy (M.P.P.) from the University of Michigan in the United States in 1982. He then earned a Ph.D. in business administration from National Chengchi University in 1994. His doctoral dissertation was titled, "Discussion on the scope of cross-organizational information system planning" (Chinese: 跨組織資訊系統規劃範圍之探討).
