= Liu Kuang-hua =

Taiwanese politician

Liu Kuang-hua (Chinese: 劉光華; born 19 September 1943) is a Taiwanese politician.

Liu completed graduate study in law at National Chengchi University. He taught as a professor at NCCU, and was a part-time instructor at several other universities, including Tamkang University, Central Police University, Tunghai University, and Chinese Culture University.

Liu was a party list member of the Legislative Yuan for three terms, serving as a representative of the Kuomintang from 1993 to 2002. In December 2000, Liu called attention to an Examination Yuan resolution that violated Taiwanese nationality law and the Civil Servants Employment Law. In March 2001, he noted the actions of some presidential advisers, and proposed that the number of advisers be reduced. The next month, Liu expressed support for amendments to the Physicians' Law that would allow physicians accredited by foreign medical associations to practice in Taiwan. Before stepping down from the Legislative Yuan in January 2002, Liu advised that his colleagues quickly consider budget bills. He was recommended by the Kuomintang to serve on the Central Election Commission in 2007 and 2009.
