= Kuo Cheng-chuan =

Taiwanese politician and business executive

Kuo Cheng-chuan (Chinese: 郭政權; pinyin: Guō Zhèngquán; born 1953) is a Taiwanese politician and business executive.

Kuo graduated from what became Central Police University, and worked for police departments in Taichung County, Taipei County, and Nantou County. Kuo was elected to the Legislative Yuan in 1992 and 1995, as a member of the Kuomintang representing Taichung County. After stepping down from the legislature, Kuo became general manager of Ever Fortune Industrial Company.
