= Chu Chin-peng =

Taiwanese politician

- 朱景鵬

Minister of Research, Development and Evaluation Commission of the Republic of China
- In office 30 September 2009 – 4 July 2012
- Preceded by: Jiang Yi-huah; Sung Yu-hsieh (acting)
- Succeeded by: Sung Yu-hsieh

Personal details
- Born: 14 September 1963 (age 62)
- Education: Fu Jen Catholic University (BA); Tamkang University (LLM); Justus-Liebig University (PhD)

Chu Chin-peng (Chinese: 朱景鵬; pinyin: Zhū Jǐngpéng; born 14 September 1963) is a Taiwanese politician. He was the Minister of the Research, Development and Evaluation Commission of the Executive Yuan from 2009 to 2012.

== Education ==
Chu obtained his bachelor's degree in German language and German literature from Fu Jen Catholic University in 1986 and master's degree in law from Tamkang University in 1988. He then pursued his doctoral degree at Justus-Liebig University in Germany and obtained his degree in 1995.

== Personal life ==
Chu is married with one son.
