= Fan Chiang Tai-chi =

Taiwanese politician and actor

- 范姜泰基

Deputy Minister of Research, Development and Evaluation Commission of the Republic of China
- In office 18 February 2013 – 21 January 2014
- Minister: Sung Yu-hsieh
- Succeeded by: Position abolished

Personal details
- Born: 12 September 1970 (age 55) Taiwan
- Party: Kuomintang
- Education: National Taiwan University (BA, MA); National Chengchi University (MBA)

Fan Chiang Tai-chi (Chinese: 范姜泰基; pinyin: Fàn Jiāng Tàijī; born 12 September 1970) is a Taiwanese actor and former politician. He was the Deputy Minister of the Research, Development and Evaluation Commission (RDEC) of the Executive Yuan from 18 February 2013 until 21 January 2014. In 2015, he became an actor.

== Early life and education ==
Fan was born in Xinwu District, Taoyuan. He graduated from National Taiwan University with a bachelor's degree in sociology and a master's degree in political science. He then earned an M.B.A. from National Chengchi University.

== Political career ==
Prior to taking office as the deputy head of RDEC, Fan was the spokesperson of the ROC Presidential Office.
