= Chao Shou-po =

Taiwanese lawyer and politician

- 趙守博
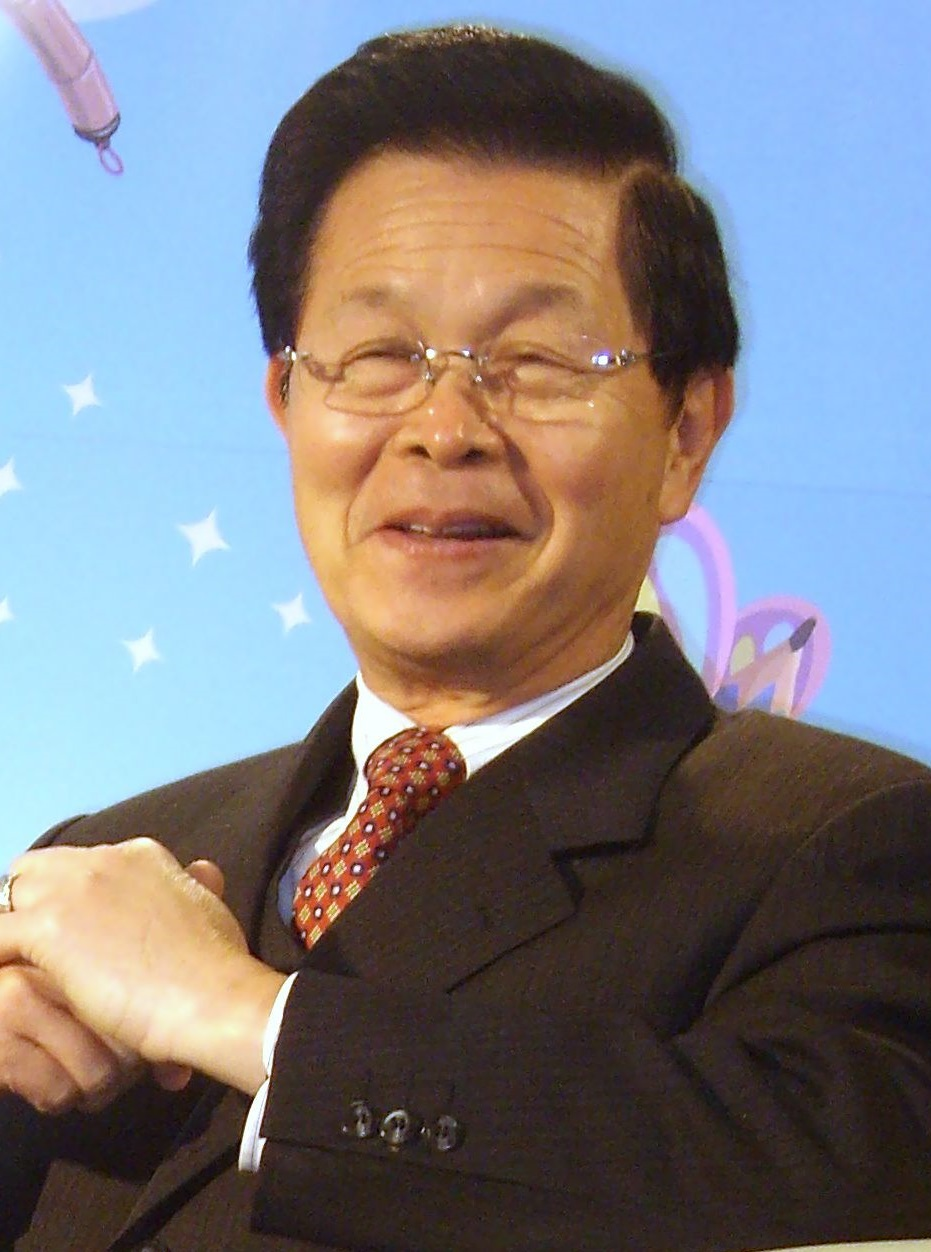
- Chao in 2008

Commissioner of the Chinese Professional Baseball League
- In office 21 December 2005 – 12 March 2012
- Preceded by: Harvey Tung; Hung Jui-ho (acting)
- Succeeded by: Huang Chen-tai

Governor of Taiwan Province
- In office 21 December 1998 – 2 May 2000
- Preceded by: James Soong
- Succeeded by: Chiang Ching-hsien (acting); Chang Po-ya

Minister without Portfolio of the Executive Yuan
- In office 15 May 1997 – 21 December 1998

Secretary-General of Executive Yuan
- In office 14 December 1993 – 1 September 1997
- Preceded by: Li Ho-kao
- Succeeded by: Chang Yu-hsui

Minister of Council of Labor Affairs of the Republic of China
- In office February 1989 – 1994
- Preceded by: Cheng Shuei-chih
- Succeeded by: Hsieh Shen-shan

Personal details
- Born: 1 March 1941 (age 85) Rokkō Town, Shōka District, Taichū Prefecture, Taiwan, Empire of Japan (modern-day Lukang, Changhua County, Taiwan)
- Party: Kuomintang
- Education: Central Police University (LLB); University of Illinois Urbana-Champaign (LLM, SJD)

Chao Shou-po (Chinese: 趙守博; pinyin: Zhào Shǒubó, born 1 March 1941) is a Taiwanese lawyer and politician who has served as Governor of Taiwan Province and Commissioner of the Chinese Professional Baseball League. He is also a prominent leader in the World Scout Movement.

He has served as a Presidium Member of the Central Advisory Committee of the Kuomintang, and has taught law at several Taiwanese universities. Chao was the president of the Asia-Pacific Regional Scout Foundation Management Committee and the chairman of the Foundation of the Scouts of China (Taiwan). He has held many government posts including Labor Minister, Secretary-General of the Cabinet, Minister without Portfolio and Governor of the Province of Taiwan. Chao served the Ma Ying-jeou administration as senior adviser.

== Early life and education ==
Chao was born on 1 March 1941 in Lukang, Changhua County, during the period of Taiwan under Japanese rule. He was raised in Caogang (草港), a rural community in Lukang, in an impoverished farming family. As a child, he helped tend his family's cattle before and after school and during school holidays. He attended Caogang Elementary School, and graduated from Taichung First Senior High School in 1959.

After high school, Chao sat the college entrance examinations and was admitted to study zoology at National Taiwan University. However, because of severe flooding in August 1959, his family could not afford his college expenses, so he enrolled at the tuition-free Central Police College (now Central Police University) instead. He graduated from the college in 1963 with a Bachelor of Laws (LL.B.) degree, specializing in police administration.

In 1966, Chao traveled to the United States to pursue graduate studies at the University of Illinois Urbana-Champaign. He earned a Master of Laws (LL.M.) from the University of Illinois College of Law in 1968. He then earned his Doctor of Juridical Science (J.S.D.) degree from the university in 1972. His doctoral dissertation was titled, Comparative Aspects of Conflict of Laws in Domestic Relations.

== Career in governmental services ==
Chao has a long career in governmental services in Taiwan from the 1970s to the 2000s. He became the commissioner of the Department of Information of the Taiwan Provincial Government in 1976 at the age of 35, concurrently the spokesman of the Taiwan Provincial Government, the youngest Provincial Government department commissioner in history up to then. Before that he had been the director-general from 1974 to 1976 of the School Youth Service Department of the Headquarters of the quasi-governmental China Youth Corps, a very politically influential youth movement organization in the 1950s through 1980's in Taiwan founded by Chiang Ching-kuo, who was Premier from 1972 to 1978 and President from 1978 to 1988 of the Republic of China on Taiwan.

In January through March 1979 Chao was designated by the national government as a member of a special mission headed by Political Vice Minister of Foreign Affairs Yang Hsi-kun to go to Washington D.C. to negotiate with representatives of the U.S. State Department including Richard Holbrooke and Roger Sullivan a new arrangement of relations between Taiwan and the United States after the U.S. switched its formal diplomatic relations from Republic of China (ROC) on Taiwan to the People's Republic of China (PRC) in mainland China. The negotiation resulted in the enactment by the U.S. Congress of the Taiwan Relations Act which has been one of the most important guidelines for U.S. policy toward Taiwan and has become the major foundation for the current Taiwan–U.S. relations. For his contributions to the negotiation and the distinguished services he had demonstrated in the government, Chao was chosen as one of the Ten Outstanding Young Persons in 1979 by the Junior Chamber International, TAIWAN.

In October 1979, Chao was appointed as Commissioner of the Council of the Taiwan Provincial Government. He was Commissioner of the Department of Social Affairs of the Taiwan Provincial Government from 1981 to 1987; during this period, Chao initiated many innovative programs and projects to upgrade and expand the social welfare services, employment security, occupational health and safety, labor insurance, community development in the Province of Taiwan, making great contributions to the improvement of the well-being of the people, especially the employed and the low-income people.

In February 1989, Chao was appointed as the Labor Minister (officially called at that time the Chairman of the Council of Labor Affairs of the Executive Yuan, the council now has been changed to Ministry of Labor) of the National Government of the Republic of China (Taiwan), a post he held until December 1994, making him the longest-serving labor minister until now in Taiwan. When he was Labor Minister, Chao modernized labor legislation; making sure that all labor laws were 100% implemented; improved work conditions for the employed; raised the minimum wage every year; enhanced the occupational health and safety; expanded programs for employment services and vocational training; strengthened labor insurance protection; opened job market for alien workers for the first time in the country's history, enacting the country's first law governing the importation, regulation and protection of alien workers. He maintained a good and reasonable balance between the employers and the employed and helped the labor unions to function more effectively and properly.

In December 1994, Chao became the secretary-general of the Cabinet headed by Premier Lien Chan, a post he held until June 1997 when he was appointed as a minister without portfolio after a cabinet reshuffle. He was in charge of the review of the legislative proposals and governmental programs as submitted by the various ministries to the cabinet in the areas of social welfare, labor affairs, justice, youth affairs, police and internal affairs when he was minister without portfolio. Chao was made the governor of the Province of Taiwan from December 1998 to May 2000 with the duty to restructure the Taiwan Provincial Government. He retired from the governmental service in May 2000 after his party, the Kuomintang, was defeated in the 2000 presidential election.

In 2008, Chao was appointed by President Ma Ying-jeou of the ROC as the Presidential National Policy Advisor, a post he held until January 2011 when President Ma appointed him as the Senior Advisor to the President of the Republic of China, a post he has held since then.

== Party politics ==
Chao Shou-po has involved actively also in the party affairs in the Kuomintang (Nationalist Party), the ruling party from 1949 to 2000 and from 2008 until now, in the Republic of China on Taiwan. He was a Central Committee member from 1980 to 2001, a Central Standing Committee (equivalent of Political Bureau) member from 1996 to 2000 of the Kuomintang. He served as the deputy director-general of the Department of Information and Propaganda (1979 to 1981), director-general of the Department of Social Affairs (1987 to 1989) and director-general of the Department of Organization (2000 to 2001) of the Central Committee of the Kuomintang during the party chairmanship respectively of Chiang Ching-kuo, Lee Teng-hui and Lien Chan. Chao has been a Presidium Member of the Central Advisory Committee of the Kuomintang since 2001.

== Services in media, professional baseball, and civic organizations ==
Chao was the chairman of the Board of the Broadcasting Corporation of China (BCC), the largest broadcasting institution in Taiwan, from 2002 to 2005 and has been the host of a special Sunday commentary program called "Talk Everything for Taiwan" at the BCC since 2005.

Chao was the Commissioner of the Chinese Professional Baseball League in Taiwan from 2006 to 2012; during his term as the Commissioner, he successfully persuaded the government to give more incentives for the promotion of professional sports and for the enactment of stricter law to prevent illegal gambling regarding professional sports.

Chao was President of National Life Saving Association, R. O. C., from 1995 to 2001; President of the National Council on Social Welfare, R.O.C. of the International Council on Social Welfare(ICSW) from 1995 to 2004; He was Chairman of World Lung Kang Association (a worldwide Association of the Liu, Chang, Kuan and Chao Families) from 2003 to 2006; He was Chairman of Taiwan Chamber of Industry and Commerce from 2011 to 2015 and has been Honorary Chairman of the Cross-Strait Business Development Council since 2009.

== Scouting activities ==
Chao has been very actively involved in the Scout movement and world Scouting activities. He was a national council member in the Scouts of China in Taiwan from the 1970s until the 2010s. Chao was the chairman and the Chief Commissioner of the General Association of Scouts of China (Taiwan) from 2007 to 2013. He has been the chairman of the Board of the Scouts of China Foundation (Taiwan) since 2007.

Chao has participated many important international Scouting events including the 26th World Scout Conference in Montreal, Quebec, Canada, in 1977; the 27th World Scout Conference in 1979 in Birmingham, England, United Kingdom; the 38th World Scout Conference in Jeju Island, Korea, in 2008; the 39th World Scout Conference in Curitiba, Brazil, in 2011; and the 40th World Scout Conference in Ljubljana, Slovenia, in 2014. He also took part in several World Scout Jamborees including the 14th World Scout Jamboree in Lillehammer, Norway, in 1975; the 21st World Scout Jamboree in 2007 in Chelmsford, Essex, England, U.K.; the 22nd World Scout Jamboree in Rinkaby, Sweden, in 2011; and the 23rd World Scout Jamboree in Kirarahama, Yamaguchi, Japan, in 2015.

Chao is a 2003 recipient of the Bronze Wolf Award of the World Organization of the Scout Movement, the highest honor in the World Scout Movement.

In 2009, Chao was elected at the 23rd Asia-Pacific Regional Scout Conference in Kuala Lumpur, Malaysia, as a member of the Asia-Pacific Regional Scout Committee for a six-year term. Chao became the chairman of the Asia-Pacific Regional Scout Committee through committee election at the 24th Regional Asia-Pacific Scout Conference in November 2012 in Dhaka, Bangladesh; he served as the committee chairman until November 2015. After that he has been the president of the Asia-Pacific Regional Scout Foundation Management Committee.

== Teaching, writing and publications ==
Chao has devoted quite a lot of time to teaching at the universities in Taiwan since he returned to Taiwan after his completion of doctoral education in the United States. He was a professor of law at the Central Police College from 1972 to 1977, teaching constitution, international law and criminal law.

When he began his governmental service in the 1970s, he continued his teaching as an adjunct professor in several universities including Tunghai University and National Chung Hsing University in Taichung, National Chengchi University, National Taiwan Normal University and National Taiwan University in Taipei, teaching private international law, public international law, commercial law, labor law, labor policy, constitution and human resources development and management.

Since 2002, Chao has taught at the Graduate School of Management of I-Shou University in Kaohsiung as a chair professor. He has also taught international criminal law at the Institute of the Law of Sea of the National Taiwan Ocean University in Keelung and the Doctorate Program of the Department of Industrial Education of the National Changhua University of Education in Changhua in central Taiwan.

Chao has published many articles regarding social welfare, labor policy, labor law, international law, criminal law and has written and published in Chinese the following books: (1.) A Comparative Study of Choice of Law Rules Concerning Domestic Relations in Conflict of Laws (1977); (2.) Law and Innovation (1980); (3.) Social Policy, Family Welfare and Community Development (1986); (4.) Social Problems and Social Welfare (1990); (5.) Labor Policy and Labor Problems (1992); (6.) The Winning Philosophy of Life Management (2004); (7.) Getting Involved─My Recollections & Observations of Studying in U.S., Now & Then (2004); (8.) My European Diary—What I Saw and Thought of My 13 Trips to Europe for the Past 30 Years (2005); (9.) Appointment with the Youth—Chao Shou-po Talks with Experts on Youth Problems (2005); (10.) The Critical Moments in My 70 Years of Life—A Memoir (2011); and (11.) Notes on Scouting—My Experiences in and Observations on the Scout Movement (2012). Chao is now writing books on international criminal law, international labor law and comparative industrial relations.
