= Chiou Jiunn-rong =

Taiwanese economist

- 邱俊榮

Deputy Minister of National Development Council of the Republic of China
- In office 8 September 2017 – 8 July 2018 Serving with Tseng Shu-cheng, Kao Shien-quey
- Minister: Chen Mei-ling
- Preceded by: Kung Ming-hsin

Personal details
- Education: National Taiwan University (BA, MA, PhD)

Chiou Jiunn-rong (Chinese: 邱俊榮; pinyin: Qiū Jùnróng) is a Taiwanese economist. He was the deputy minister of the National Development Council in 2017–2018.

== Education ==
Chiou earned his bachelor's degree, master's degree, and Ph.D. in economics from National Taiwan University in 1989, 1991, and 1995, respectively. His doctoral dissertation was titled, "Research and Development, Technology Transfer, Insufficient Information and Direct Investment of Multinational Manufacturers" (Chinese: 研究發展、技術移轉、訊息不充分與跨國廠商的直接投資).

== Academic career ==
After receiving his doctorate, Chiou became a professor of industrial economics at Tamkang University, where he was an associate professor from August 1995 to July 2000, department chair from August 1998 to July 2000, and then a full professor from August 2000 to July 2003.

== Political careers ==
Chiou started his political career when he joined the Taipei City Government in March 2015 as an adviser. He then subsequently became the committee member of Mainland Affairs Council in 2016.

=== National Development Council ===
Chiou was appointed as the deputy minister of the National Development Council on 7 September 2017 by Premier-appointed William Lai and took office the day later. On 28 January 2018, Choiu was appointed as one of the ten members of New Southbound Policy task force. On 8 July 2018, Chiou tendered his resignation from the council after caught taking a photo of a woman's legs at Ximen MRT station a day earlier.
