= Irving H.C. Tai =

Taiwanese politician

Tai Hao-chun
- 戴豪君

Deputy Minister of the Research, Development and Evaluation Commission of the Executive Yuan
- Minister: Sung Yu-hsieh
- Succeeded by: Position abolished

Personal details
- Education: Soochow University (LLB); Tamkang University (LLM, PhD)

Tai Hao-chun (Chinese: 戴豪君; pinyin: Dài Háojūn), also known by his English name Irving H. C. Tai, is a Taiwanese politician. He was the Deputy Minister of the Research, Development and Evaluation Commission of the Executive Yuan until 21 January 2014.

== Education ==
Tai received his bachelor's degree in law from Soochow University School of Law, master's in law from Tamkang University and doctorate in European studies from Tamkang University.
