= Premier Jiang =

Premier Jiang may refer to:

- Jiang Yi-huah (born 1960), 25th Premier of the Republic of China
- Chiang Ching-kuo (蔣經國; pinyin: Jiǎng Jīnggúo;1910–1988), 9th Premier of the Republic of China
- Chiang Kai-shek (蔣介石; pinyin: Jiǎng Jìeshí;1887–1975), 2nd, 5th and 7th Premier of the Republic of China
