= Huang Chen-tai =

Taiwanese chemist and academic

- 黃鎮台
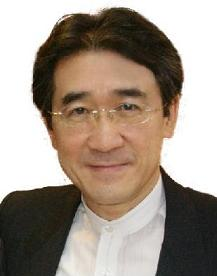

Commissioner of the Chinese Professional Baseball League
- In office 12 March 2012 – 25 July 2014
- Preceded by: Chao Shou-po
- Succeeded by: Hsieh Chih-peng (acting); John Wu

President of Soochow University
- In office 2008–2011
- Preceded by: Liu Chao-shiuan
- Succeeded by: Pan Wei-ta

Minister of the National Science Council
- In office 5 February 1998 – 19 May 2000
- Preceded by: Liu Chao-shiuan
- Succeeded by: Weng Cheng-yi

President of Feng Chia University
- In office 1 August 1995 – 4 February 1998
- Preceded by: Yang Chun-chung
- Succeeded by: Liu An-chi

Vice Minister of Education
- In office 1994–1995
- Minister: Kuo Wei-fan

Vice Minister of the Research, Development and Evaluation Commission
- In office 1991–1994
- Minister: Ma Ying-jeou; Sun Te-hsiung; Wang Jen-huong
- Preceded by: Sun Te-hsiung

Personal details
- Born: 17 October 1948 (age 78) Tainan County, Taiwan
- Party: Kuomintang
- Education: National Taiwan University (BS); University of Virginia (MS); Columbia University (PhD)

Huang Chen-tai (Chinese: 黃鎮台; born 17 October 1948) is a Taiwanese chemist and academic. He was vice minister of the Research, Development and Evaluation Commission from 1991 to 1994, before assuming the same position at the Ministry of Education until 1995. Subsequently, he was named president of Feng Chia University, where he served until his 1998 appointment as minister of the National Science Council. Huang stepped down from the position in 2000 and became active in the John Tung Foundation. In 2008, Huang left the FCU faculty and became the president of Soochow University. He was named commissioner of the Chinese Professional Baseball League in 2012 and served until his resignation in 2014.

== Education ==
Huang graduated from National Taiwan University with a Bachelor of Science (B.S.) in chemistry in 1970, then completed graduate studies in the United States. He earned a Master of Science (M.S.) in chemistry from the University of Virginia in 1973 and his Ph.D. in chemical physics in 1977 from Columbia University under the doctoral supervision of professor Bruce Berne. He did postdoctoral work at Princeton University and the University of Chicago.

== Career ==
Upon his return to Taiwan, Huang joined the faculty of National Tsing Hua University, where he taught chemistry from 1979 to 1991, while also working for the National Science Council and Ministry of Education. In 1991, Huang became vice minister of the Research, Development and Evaluation Commission, and joined the Ministry of Education in the same capacity in 1994. The next year, Huang was appointed president of Feng Chia University.

He left FCU to chair the National Science Council. As head of the NSC, Huang advocated for research into aftershocks and mapping of the Chelungpu fault, on which the epicenter of the 1999 Chi-Chi earthquake sat. Near the end of his term in 2000, Huang promised to resolve an investigation into United Microelectronics Corporation, which had built a plant in 1998 without submitting an environmental impact assessment for government approval. Huang also announced plans to expand science-based industrial parks across Taiwan. Upon leaving the NSC, Huang joined the John Tung Foundation, and was a proponent of suicide prevention and mental health initiatives.

Huang was named president of Soochow University, where he remained until 2011. In 2012, he was appointed commissioner of the Chinese Professional Baseball League. As CPBL commissioner, Huang oversaw the sale and renaming of the Sinon Bulls to the EDA Rhinos. During his tenure, Huang also explored ways to expand the league. In July 2014, Huang resigned as CPBL commissioner due to a contract dispute with MP & Silva, the company responsible for arranging television broadcasts of league contests.
