= National Archives (Taiwan) =

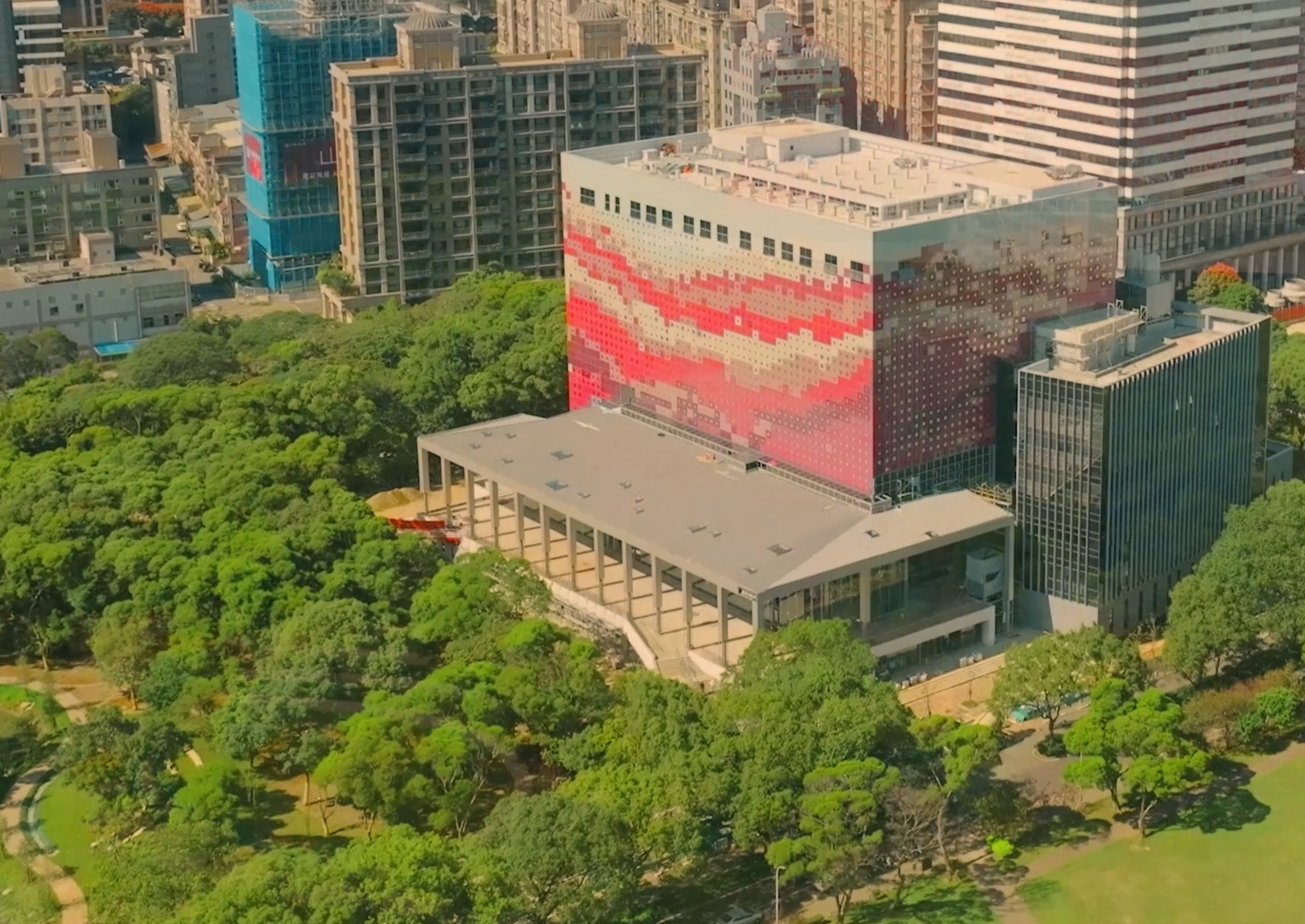
National Archives of Taiwan

The National Archives (Chinese: 國家檔案館; Tongyong Pinyin: Gúo jīa dǎng àn guǎn) are the national archives of Taiwan.

The archives are subordinate to the National Archives Administration, itself a part of the National Development Council. After a soft opening from 2 September 2025, the archive formally began operations on 22 November 2025, marking the National Archives Administration's 25th anniversary. Commenting on 17 November 2025 prior to the official opening, President Lai Ching-te observed that the all other government agencies were legally required to transfer their records to the archives, as part of the archives' responsibility to collect and preserve important records from all levels of government, alongside valuable documents from private groups and Taiwan-related records held overseas.

The archive, located in Linkou District of New Taipei, is open from 09:00 to 17:00, Tuesday through Saturday, and closed on Sunday and Monday, as well as on national holidays, and during Lunar New Year. The building's first through third floors are open to the public and feature permanent and special exhibitions, an interactive area designed for children, shops, and a café. The upper floors are dedicated to professional archival activities.
