= Chang Nien-chung =

Taiwanese politician

- 張念中

Deputy Minister of Directorate-General of Personnel Administration of the Republic of China
- In office 16 January 2013 – 1 March 2017
- Minister: Huang Fu-yuan; Jay N. Shih
- Succeeded by: Hwai Hsu

Personal details
- Born: 1953 (age 72–73)
- Education: National Chengchi University (BA, MA)

Yen Chiu-lai (Chinese: 張念中; pinyin: Zhāng Niànzhōng) is a Taiwanese politician. He has served as the Deputy Minister of the Directorate-General of Personnel Administration of the Executive Yuan since 16 January 2013.

== Education ==
Yen obtained his bachelor's degree in political science and master's degree in public administration from National Chengchi University in 1975 and 1981, respectively.

== Directorate-General of Personnel Administration Deputy Ministry ==
=== Dispatched labor in Taiwan ===
Commenting on the widespread use of dispatched labor in Taiwan, which was alleged to cause wage stagnation, Yen said that the banning of such practice would be difficult because the needs to reduce personnel costs.
