= Jay N. Shih =

Taiwanese politician

Shih Neng-chieh
- 施能傑
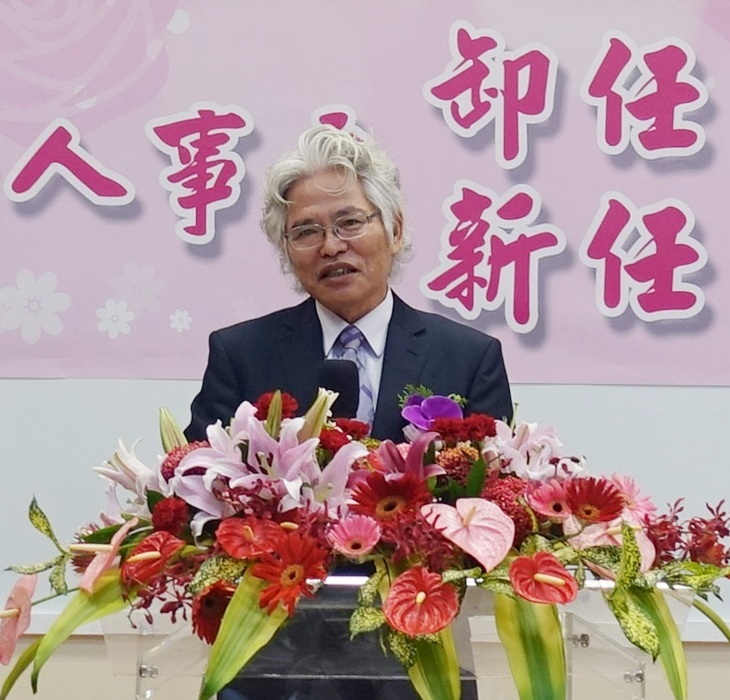

Minister of Directorate-General of Personnel Administration of the Republic of China
- In office 20 May 2016 – 10 February 2022
- Deputy: Chang Nien-chung, Su Chun-jung; Hwai Hsu, Su Chun-jung
- Preceded by: Huang Fu-yuan
- Succeeded by: Su Chun-jung

Minister of Research, Development and Evaluation Commission of the Republic of China
- In office May 2006 – 19 May 2008
- Preceded by: Yeh Jiunn-rong
- Succeeded by: Jiang Yi-huah

Deputy Minister of Research, Development and Evaluation Commission of the Republic of China
- In office May 2004 – May 2006
- Minister: Yeh Jiunn-rong

Personal details
- Born: 1960 (age 65–66)
- Education: National Taiwan University (BA); National Chengchi University (MA); Syracuse University (MPA); University of Pittsburgh (PhD)

Shih Ning-jye (Chinese: 施能傑; pinyin: Shī Néngjié; born 1960), also known by his English name Jay, is a Taiwanese politician. He was the Minister of the Directorate-General of Personnel Administration from 20 May 2016 to 10 February 2022. He was the Minister of the Research, Development and Evaluation Commission of the Executive Yuan from 2006 to 2008.

== Education ==
Shih graduated from National Taiwan University with a bachelor's degree in political science in 1983 and earned a master's degree in public administration from National Chengchi University in 1985. He then completed graduate studies in the United States in multiple fields, earning a Master of Public Administration (M.P.A.) from Syracuse University in 1987 and his Ph.D. in public affairs and international affairs from the University of Pittsburgh in 1991. His doctoral dissertation, completed under professors Louise K. Comfort and Cho-yun Hsu, was titled, "The antecedents and consequences of job involvement: a case of the Taipei municipal government".
