= Yen Chiu-lai =

Taiwanese politician

- 顏秋來

Deputy Minister of the Directorate-General of Personnel Administration of the Republic of China
- In office 6 February 2012 – ?
- Minister: Wu Tai-cheng; Huang Fu-yuan
- Preceded by: self
- Succeeded by: Chu Yung-lung

Deputy Minister of the Central Personnel Administration of the Republic of China
- In office 16 September 2009 – 5 February 2012
- Preceded by: Hwang Giin-Tarng (黃錦堂)
- Succeeded by: self
- In office November 2005 – May 2008
- Preceded by: Li Ruo-yi (李若一)
- Succeeded by: Chung Yee-Lan (鐘昱男)

Personal details
- Born: 1949 (age 76–77)
- Education: Tamkang University (BA); National Chengchi University (MA)

Yen Chiu-lai (Chinese: 顏秋來; pinyin: Yán Qiūlái) is a Taiwanese politician. He served as political Deputy Minister of the Central Personnel Administration (CPA) of the Executive Yuan from 2005 to 2008 and again from 16 September 2009 to 5 February 2012. On 6 February 2012, the CPA was renamed the Directorate-General of Personnel Administration (DGPA). Yen continued to serve as political Deputy Minister of the DGPA.

== Education ==
Yen received a bachelor's degree in public administration from Tamkang University in 1981, and a master's in the same field from National Chengchi University in 1986.

== Career ==
Yen served in various roles in the CPA from 1989 until 1998, when he moved to the Ministry of Economic Affairs (MOEA). In 2000 he left the MOEA for the Ministry of Civil Service, and in 2004 he returned to the CPA, becoming Deputy Minister in 2005 and serving in this capacity through the CPA-to-DGPA transition in 2012, except for a break from May 2008 to September 2009.
