= Chen Tain-jy =

Taiwanese economist

- 陳添枝

Minister of National Development Council
- In office 20 May 2016 – 7 September 2017
- Deputy: Kung Ming-hsin, Tseng Shu-cheng, Kao Shien-quey
- Preceded by: Lin Chu-chia
- Succeeded by: Chen Mei-ling

Minister without Portfolio
- In office 20 May 2016 – 2017
- Premier: Lin Chuan
- Succeeded by: Hsu Kuo-yung

Minister of Council for Economic Planning and Development
- In office 20 May 2008 – 10 September 2009
- Preceded by: Ho Mei-yueh
- Succeeded by: Tsai Hsun-hsiung

Personal details
- Born: 24 June 1953 (age 72)
- Education: National Taiwan University (BS); Pennsylvania State University (PhD)

Chen Tain-jy (Chinese: 陳添枝; pinyin: Chén Tiānzhī) is a Taiwanese economist. He was the Minister of National Development Council from 2016 to 2017.

== Education ==
Chen graduated from National Taiwan University with a bachelor's degree in electrical engineering, then completed doctoral studies in the United States, where he earned his Ph.D. in economics from Pennsylvania State University in 1983 under economics professor Eric Bond. His doctoral dissertation was titled, "Foreign investment, duty-free zones, and national welfare". He then returned to Taiwan to teach at NTU.

== Political career ==
He led the Council for Economic Planning and Development from 2008 to 2009, during the Ma Ying-jeou administration, and returned to government work in 2016 to serve as minister of the National Development Council.
