= Su Chun-jung =

Taiwanese politician (born 1960)

- 蘇俊榮
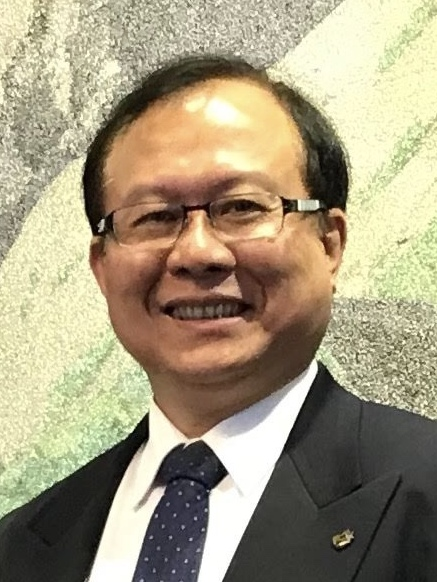

Minister of Personnel Administration
- Incumbent
- Assumed office 10 February 2022
- Prime Minister: Su Tseng-chang; Chen Chien-jen
- Preceded by: Jay N. Shih

Deputy Minister of Personnel Administration
- In office 20 May 2016 – 10 February 2022
- Minister: Jay N. Shih

Personal details
- Born: 1960 (age 65–66)
- Party: Independent
- Education: National Chung Hsing University (BS); Boston University (MS)

Su Chun-jung (Chinese: 蘇俊榮; pinyin: Sū Jùnróng; born 1960) is a Taiwanese politician. He has served as the Minister of the Directorate-General of Personnel Administration since 10 February 2022, after previously serving as the Deputy Minister of the Directorate-General of Personnel Administration from 20 May 2016 to 10 February 2022.

== Education ==
Su obtained his bachelor's degree in statistics from National Chung Hsing University in 1983 and his master's degree in computer science from Boston University in the United States in 1988.

== Career ==
At the Financial Data Center of the Ministry of Finance (MOF), he was the Deputy Director-General (2009-2011) and Director-General (2011–2013). From 2013 to 2016, he was the Director-General of the MOF's Fiscal Information Agency.

In 2016, Su was named Deputy Minister of the Directorate-General of Personnel Administration under Jay N. Shih. On 10 February 2022, Su took over Shih's position and became the Minister of the Directorate-General of Personnel Administration.
