= Kuo Cheng (politician) =

Politician of ROC

- 郭澄

Secretary-general of the National Assembly
- In office 8 June 1966 – 6 June 1972
- Preceded by: Ku Cheng-kang
- Succeeded by: Ho I-wu
- In office 15 September 1976 – 29 September 1980
- Preceded by: Chen Chien-chung
- Succeeded by: Ho I-wu

Personal details
- Born: 21 August 1907 Shanxi Province, Qing Empire
- Died: 29 September 1980 (aged 73) Taipei, Taiwan
- Party: Kuomintang
- Spouse: Kuo Wang Chün-tien
- Children: Kuo Li
- Occupation: Politician

Kuo Cheng (Chinese: 郭澄; pinyin: Guō Chéng; 21 August 1907 – 29 September 1980), courtesy name Jìngqiū (鏡秋), was a Chinese politician of the Kuomintang.

Kuo was a native of Shanxi Province. During his early career he served as Chief of the Shanxi Branch of the Three Principles of the People Youth Corps and later became Deputy Speaker of the Shanxi Provincial Assembly. After the relocation of the Republic of China government to Taiwan in 1949, he continued to hold senior party and government roles. He served as Secretary-general of the National Assembly in two separate terms, first from 1966 to 1972 and again from 1976 until his death in 1980. He also chaired the Kuomintang Taiwan Provincial Party Department from 1954 to 1958.

== Early life and education ==
Kuo was born in Yangqu County, Shanxi Province in 1907. He completed secondary education locally and later studied politics at China University, Beijing, graduating from the Department of Politics in 1932.

== In Mainland China ==
In the 1930s and 1940s Kuo became active in party youth work. He joined the Three Principles of the People Youth Corps (三民主義青年團) in 1937 and by the end of the Second World War had taken on senior responsibilities within the Shanxi provincial youth organisation. In 1945 he was appointed Director of the Shanxi branch of the Youth Corps; in March 1947 he was re-elected with a large majority as the branch secretary at the organisation's representative assembly. Later in 1947 Kuo was elected Vice-Speaker of the Shanxi Provincial Council and also delegate to the First National Assembly.

== In Taiwan ==
Following the KMT retreat to Taiwan, Chiang Kai-shek launched a Party Reform Program in 1950 intended to reorganise party structures and purge corruption and factionalism. In September 1950 Kuo was appointed as head of the Seventh Department, charged with oversight of party-run enterprises and the economic welfare of party staff.

After the Seventh National Congress arrangements Kuo was elevated to further central party responsibilities. In October 1952 he was assigned to the Kuomintang Central Committee as a deputy-secretary. Over the 1950s and 1960s he served on a variety of party commissions and working groups concerned with party organisation, mobilisation and the management of party enterprises.

Kuo took part in several high-level party-government coordination efforts and in the 1950s and 1960s was frequently called on to chair or convene coordination mechanisms. During the severe floods that struck central Taiwan in August 1959 (the "8-7" floods), Kuo travelled on foot into the affected areas to supervise relief operations; for his service he was awarded the Fourth Class Order of Brilliant Star by President Chiang Kai-shek and received a Taiwan Construction Medal from the provincial government.

In 1965, while serving as Secretary of the Central Policy Committee. In June 1966 he was appointed Secretary-General of the National Assembly and in the same year was elected a member of the KMT Central Standing Committee. He continued to serve in senior administrative and advisory roles through the 1970s, including a period as a minister-without-portfolio in the Cabinet at the invitation of Premier Chiang Ching-kuo, and as head of the Research, Development and Evaluation Commission in the mid-1970s. In 1978 Kuo was again recalled to serve as Secretary-General of the National Assembly to preside over the Sixth National Assembly, during which Chiang Ching-kuo was elected president.

Kuo died on 29 September 1980 at the Taipei Veterans General Hospital. His funeral services were held at Taipei Zhongshan Hall on 14 October 1980, with former president Yen Chia-kan serving as the funeral committee chairman and senior Kuomintang figures in attendance. He was interred at Jinshan Anle Garden.
