= Party Reform Program =

The Party Reform Program (Chinese: 中國國民黨改造方案; Wade–Giles: Chung^{1}kuo^{2} Kuo^{2}min^{2}tang^{3} kai^{3}tsao^{4} fang^{1}an^{4}; lit. 'Kuomintang Reform Program') was a party modernization campaign led by Chiang Kai-shek from 1950 to 1952, aimed at addressing the corruption, power-brokering, and factional struggles that had plagued the Kuomintang, which were seen as significant factors in the party's defeat in the Chinese Civil War. The program, based on Leninism, sought to reaffirm the KMT's adherence to democratic centralism, ideological purity, and the principle of party leadership over the state, while isolating the influence of the CC Clique. This reform laid the groundwork for the dominance of Chen Cheng's Tsotanhui Clique and eventually facilitated Chiang Ching-kuo's succession.

The reform was overseen by the Central Reform Committee, which established one office, seven departments, and five committees. Central Reform Committee were often regarded as Taiwan's "Supreme Cabinet" during the reform.

== Structure of Central Reform Committee ==
The Central Reform Committee consisted of 16 members and was tasked with overseeing the implementation of the party reforms. The members included:

- Chen Cheng
- Chiang Ching-kuo
- Chang Ch'i-yun
- Chang Tao-fan
- Ku Cheng-kang
- Zheng Yanfen
- Chen Hsueh-ping
- Hu Chien-chung
- Yuan Shouqian
- Cui Shuqin
- Gu Fengxiang
- Zeng Xubai
- Xiao Zicheng
- Shen Chang-huan
- Kuo Cheng
- Lien Chen-tung

The Central Reform Committee established one office, seven departments, and five councils to manage the reform efforts:

=== Departments ===
- First Department / General Party Affairs Department – Led by Chen Hsueh-ping, responsible for guiding local party branches throughout Taiwan.
- Second Department / Special Party Affairs Department – Led by Ku Cheng-kang, responsible for guiding external organizations such as industrial, professional, student, women's, and military groups.
- Third Department / Overseas Party Affairs Department – Led by Zheng Yanfen, responsible for guiding overseas party members.
- Fourth Department / Central Propaganda Department – Responsible for managing party propaganda.
- Fifth Department / Political Party Members Department – Led by Yuan Shouqian, responsible for guiding party members involved in politics.
- Sixth Department / Enemy Territory Party Members Department – Led by Tang Zhong, responsible for guiding work in mainland China-controlled areas.
- Seventh Department / Party Members' Economic Affairs Department – Led by Kuo Cheng, responsible for managing the KMT's enterprises and the economic activities of party members.

=== Committees ===
In addition to the seven departments, five committees were established to oversee other important aspects of the reform:

- Cadre Training Committee – Led by Chiang Ching-kuo, responsible for the training of party cadres.
- Disciplinary Inspection Committee – Led by Li Wenfan and Di Ying, responsible for investigating and maintaining discipline within the party.
- Finance Committee – Led by Yu Hung-chun, responsible for managing the party's finances.
- Design Committee – Led by Xiao Zicheng, responsible for party organizational and visual design.
- Party History and Archives Compilation Committee – Led by Luo Jialun, responsible for compiling the party's historical records.

The Party Reform Program was a significant step in modernizing the Kuomintang and reinforcing its organizational structure, ultimately shaping the future political landscape in Taiwan.

== Process ==
Chiang Kai-shek's intent to reform the Kuomintang predated its retreat to Taiwan. As early as 1947, following the merger of the Three Principles of the People Youth Corps with the party, Chiang characterized the restructuring effort as revolutionary in nature. He wrote:

Zhongzheng has repeatedly and clearly told his comrades: the merger of the Party and the Corps must be regarded as a political revolution rather than a technical adjustment. If it fails to bring about political reform, then factionalism within the Kuomintang—from the central leadership down to every county—will only become more severe.

In early April 1948, Hu Shih suggested to Chiang Kai-shek that "the Kuomintang would be best divided into two or three political parties." Hu also reportedly proposed that Chiang consider the example of Mustafa Kemal Atatürk in Turkey, and split the Kuomintang into two parties to establish a foundation for a two-party system. Similar opinions were expressed by other figures, including Premier Zhang Qun.

After stepping down from office in January 1949, Chiang expressed regret over the shortcomings of his administration, writing in his diary on January 22:

After twenty years in power, we have done nothing for social reform or the welfare of the people. Party, government, military, and education personnel focus only on holding office and neglect the realization of the Three Principles of the People. From now on, all education must be grounded in livelihood. Though the sheep are lost, mending the pen is not too late.

From 20 December 1949 to 2–3 January 1950, Chiang convened a seminar at the Hanbi Tower in Sun Moon Lake to discuss the "Thorough Reform of the Party." The discussions covered three main topics: "Prerequisites for Reform," "Methods of Reform," and "Procedures for Reform."

The "Prerequisites for Reform" section emphasized that reform required a new call to action, the establishment of new standards, and a clear social base, ideological line, and policy. It also stated that reform should involve new organizational principles and leadership styles, and should aim to gain public trust through political, economic, and military reforms.

Two approaches were proposed under "Methods of Reform": Option A involved changing the party's name, with six proposed names, including "Chinese Democratic Revolutionary Party," "Chinese Revolutionary Democratic Party," "Chinese Democratic Party," "Chinese National Revolutionary Party," "New Kuomintang of China," or "Chinese National New Party." Option B proposed reforming the party's content while retaining the original name "Kuomintang." Ultimately, Option B was adopted.

On August 5, 1950, the Central Reform Committee was established, assuming the highest authority within the party, effectively replacing the Central Executive Committee. On December 22 of that year, it issued a public directive urging all party members to re-register and return to active duty or face expulsion. The committee simultaneously implemented a tightly structured, highly disciplined organizational network across Taiwan. These included rural and urban cells, youth cells, and workers' cells. Membership in these local branches became mandatory, with compulsory participation in monthly meetings and collective activities.

Chiang Ch'i-yun, a key architect of the reform campaign, described its methodology as “education-based reform,” emphasizing ideological reorientation through continuous instruction:

Our approach to party reform is centered primarily on active education.

— Chiang Ch'i-yun

Once the local structure was in place, the Central Reform Committee launched a two-pronged campaign of **education** and **training**. Educational activities were conducted through small group study sessions, while training initiatives involved dispatching propagandists across the island to deliver lectures and conduct political outreach—over 12,000 were trained for this purpose. Additionally, 3,666 local cadres were selected to attend intensive programs at the **Revolutionary Practice Research Institute** on Yangmingshan.

The campaign also featured strict disciplinary enforcement. Members found guilty of corruption, moral decadence, idleness, or ideological wavering were expelled in large numbers, reinforcing a climate of ideological rigor and organizational loyalty.

At the Kuomintang's Seventh National Congress in October 1952, Chiang Kai-shek formally declared the Party Reform Program a success. As part of this milestone, several key amendments were introduced into the party charter, institutionalizing the ideological and organizational principles of the reform movement. The new provisions included:

1. The Kuomintang is a revolutionary democratic party.
2. The party's social foundation is composed of youth, intellectuals, and the working and agricultural classes. Its core membership shall consist of patriotic revolutionaries drawn from these masses.
3. The party is organized under the principle of democratic centralism: cadres are elected, decisions are made through deliberation, individuals are subordinate to the organization, and the minority yields to the majority. Members are permitted free discussion prior to a decision, but must fully comply once a resolution is passed.
4. All decisions shall be made through organizational channels; party-wide unity is maintained through ideological communication; political leadership is exercised through policy direction; and members are evaluated based on performance in party work.
5. Policies shall be formulated according to the party's founding doctrine; personnel decisions shall be based on adherence to policy; party members in public office are to be managed by the organization; and those members must be held accountable for the execution of party decisions.
