= Han Lih-wu =

Chinese educator, politician and diplomat (1903–1991)

- 杭立武
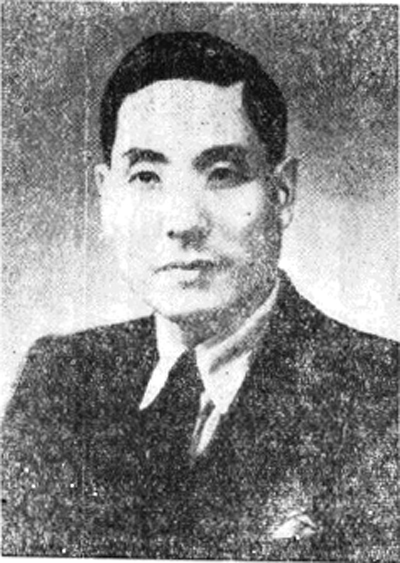

Ambassador of the Republic of China to Greece
- In office 30 July 1968 – August 1972

Ambassador of the Republic of China to the Philippines
- In office 31 March 1964 – 30 July 1968

Ambassador of the Republic of China to Laos
- In office 28 February 1962 – September 1962

Ambassador of the Republic of China to Thailand
- In office 31 August 1956 – 28 February 1962
- Preceded by: Xie Baoqiao
- Succeeded by: Liu Yu-wan

Minister of Education of the Republic of China
- In office 7 April 1949 – 16 March 1950
- Preceded by: Chu Chia-hua; Chen Hsueh-ping (acting)
- Succeeded by: Cheng Tien-fong

Administrative Deputy Minister of Education of the Republic of China
- In office 12 June 1948 – 30 December 1948
- Minister: Chu Chia-hua

Political Deputy Minister of Education of the Republic of China
- In office December 1944 – 1945
- Minister: Chu Chia-hua

Personal details
- Born: 26 January 1903 Anhui
- Died: February 26, 1991 (aged 88) Taipei, Taiwan
- Party: Kuomintang
- Education: Nanking University; University of London; University of Wisconsin–Madison

Han Lih-wu (Chinese: 杭立武; pinyin: Háng Lìwǔ; 26 January 1903 – 26 February 1991) was a Chinese educator, politician and diplomat.

== Life and career ==
Born in Anhui, Han earned degrees from Nanjing University, the University of London, and the University of Wisconsin–Madison. After completing his education in the United States, Han taught at Nanjing University until 1931, when he was named leader of the British–Chinese Educational Association, where he served until 1946.

In 1944, Han was appointed deputy minister of education. He succeeded Chen Hsueh-ping in office in 1949. Han aided the Kuomintang retreat to Taiwan later that year by moving artworks of the National Palace Museum from Peking to Taipei. He served as the Director of National Palace Museum from September 1949 to June 1956. Upon stepping down from the Ministry of Education in 1950, Han became presidential adviser to Chiang Kai-shek until 1956. He became Republic of China ambassador to Thailand that year, and in 1962, was concurrently assigned to Laos. Han later served as ambassador to the Philippines and Greece, from 1964 to 1968, and between 1968 and 1972, respectively.
