= Pan Wei-ta =

Taiwanese lawyer (born 1956)

Pan Wei-ta (Chinese: 潘維大; born 24 March 1956) is a Taiwanese lawyer.

Pan was educated at University of Nebraska College of Law and Tulane University. He has served on the board of directors of several Taiwanese companies, including Quanta Computer, China Life Insurance Company, and Aerospace Industrial Development Corporation, among others. Pan teaches law at Soochow University, and succeeded Huang Chen-tai as university president in 2012. In 2024, Pan stepped down from the presidency and was replaced by Chan Chien-lung. His younger sister Tina Pan is a former Kuomintang legislator.
