= Sun Te-hsiung =

Taiwanese sociologist (1930–2025)

- 孫得雄

Minister of the Research, Development and Evaluation Commission of the Republic of China
- In office June 1991 – December 1994
- Deputy: Huang Chen-tai
- Preceded by: Ma Ying-jeou
- Succeeded by: Wang Jen-huong

Deputy Minister of the Research, Development and Evaluation Commission of the Republic of China
- Minister: Ma Ying-jeou
- Succeeded by: Huang Chen-tai

Personal details
- Born: 30 January 1930 Japanese Taiwan
- Died: 25 June 2025 (aged 95)
- Spouse: Joyce Chao
- Education: National Taiwan University (BS); University of Michigan (PhD)

Sun Te-hsiung (Chinese: 孫得雄; pinyin: Sūn Dexióng; 30 January 1930 – 25 June 2025) was a Taiwanese sociologist who served as the Minister of the Research, Development and Evaluation Commission of the Executive Yuan from 1991 to 1994.

== Life and career ==
Sun was born in Taiwan on 30 January 1930 during Japanese rule. After graduating from National Taiwan University, he completed doctoral studies in the United States, where he earned his Ph.D. in sociology from the University of Michigan in 1968 under sociology professors David Goldberg and Ronald Freedman. His doctoral dissertation was titled, "Socio-structural analysis of fertility differentials in Taiwan".

Sun died on 25 June 2025, at the age of 95.
