= Tseng Shu-cheng =

Taiwanese architect and civil engineer

- 曾旭正

Deputy Minister of National Development Council of the Republic of China
- Incumbent
- Assumed office 20 May 2016
- Minister: Chen Tain-jy
- Deputy: Kung Ming-hsin, Kao Shien-quey; Chiou Jiunn-rong, Kao Shien-quey

Deputy Mayor of Tainan City
- In office February 2015 – May 2016
- Mayor: William Lai

Deputy Magistrate of Tainan County
- In office February 2002 – January 2003
- Magistrate: Su Huan-chih

Personal details
- Education: National Cheng Kung University (BArch); Tunghai University (MArch); National Taiwan University (PhD)

Tseng Shu-cheng (Chinese: 曾旭正; pinyin: Céng Xùzhèng) is a Taiwanese architect and civil engineer. He has served as the Deputy Minister of National Development Council since 20 May 2016.

== Academic career ==
Tseng graduated from National Cheng Kung University with a bachelor's degree in architecture in 1984. He then earned a master's degree in architecture from Tunghai University in 1987 and his Ph.D. in civil engineering from National Taiwan University in 1994. His doctoral dissertation was titled, "A Study of Urban Processes and Urban Ideology in Post-War Taipei" (Chinese: 戰後臺北的都市過程與都市意識形構之研究).

After receiving his doctorate, Tseng taught at the National University of Tainan.
