= Henry Lee (forensic scientist) =

Chinese-American forensic scientist (1938–2026)

- 李昌鈺
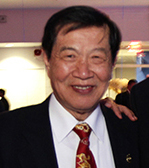
- Lee in 2013

Commissioner of the Connecticut Department of Public Safety
- In office 1998–2000
- Governor: John G. Rowland

Personal details
- Born: November 22, 1938 Rugao, Jiangsu, China
- Died: March 27, 2026 (aged 87) Henderson, Nevada, U.S.
- Citizenship: Taiwan; U.S.
- Spouses: Margaret Lee (m. 1962; died 2017); Xiaping Jiang (m. 2018)
- Education: Central Police College (BA); John Jay College (BS); New York University (MS, PhD)
- Scientific career
- Fields: Biochemistry; Forensic science
- Thesis: A new function of Escherichia coli elongation factor G in chain initiation (1975)
- Doctoral advisor: Sylvia Lee-Huang

Henry Chang-Yu Lee (Chinese: 李昌鈺; pinyin: Lǐ Chāngyù; November 22, 1938 – March 27, 2026) was a Chinese-born Taiwanese-American forensic scientist and biochemist.

== Early life and education ==
Lee was born in Rugao, Jiangsu, China, on November 22, 1938, the eleventh of thirteen children. His family moved to Shanghai in 1942, and then moved to Taiwan at the end of the Chinese Civil War. His father, who was traveling separately from the rest of the family on the Taiping, disappeared when the passenger ship sank in 1949.

In 1960, Lee graduated from Central Police College with a Bachelor of Arts in police administration. He became a police officer in the Taipei Police Department, where he rose to the rank of captain at age 22, the youngest captain in Taiwan's history.

Lee relocated to the United States with his wife in 1965. He re-enrolled in college to study forensic science in New York City, where he graduated from the John Jay College of Criminal Justice with a Bachelor of Science (B.S.) in forensic science 1972. He then earned a Master of Science (M.S.) in 1974 and his Ph.D. in 1975, both in biochemistry from New York University. His doctoral dissertation, completed under his sister, Professor Sylvia Lee-Huang, was titled, "A new function of Escherichia coli elongation factor G in chain initiation".

== Career ==
Lee was chief emeritus for the Connecticut State Police from 2000 to 2010, commissioner of Public Safety for Connecticut during 1998 to 2000 and Connecticut's chief criminalist and director of the state police forensic laboratory from 1978 to 2000.

In 2004, a crime documentary series hosted by Lee, Trace Evidence: The Case Files of Dr. Henry Lee, aired on the then Court TV network (now truTV). He appeared on Chinese television and online programs such as KangXi Lai Le in Taiwan, and Voice and Beyond the Edge in China Central Television on mainland China.

His biography, True Crime Experiences with Dr. Henry Chang-Yu Lee, was authored by attorney Daniel Hong Deng of Rosemead, California.

He was the founder of the Henry C. Lee Institute of Forensic Science, affiliated with the University of New Haven.

=== Famous cases ===
Lee worked on famous cases such as the JonBenét Ramsey murder case, the Helle Crafts wood chipper murder (the first murder conviction in Connecticut without the victim's body,) the O. J. Simpson and Laci Peterson cases, the 9/11 forensic investigation, the Washington, DC, sniper shootings and reinvestigated the assassination of John F. Kennedy.

He investigated the March 19, 2004, shooting incident of Taiwanese President Chen Shui-bian and Vice President Annette Lu.

Following the O. J. Simpson case, Independent Counsel Kenneth Starr hired Lee to join his investigation of the death of Deputy White House Counsel Vince Foster in Fort Marcy Park on July 20, 1993.

Lee also was consulted on the 1991 death of investigative journalist Danny Casolaro, who died in a West Virginia motel room. Initially, Lee said the evidence presented to him by police was consistent with suicide. A few years later when more evidence from the hotel scene was revealed to him, Lee formally withdrew his earlier conclusion and stated, "a reconstruction is only as good as the information supplied by the police".

He was consulted as a blood spatter analyst for defense during the trial of Michael Peterson, a fiction writer and politician from North Carolina who in 2003 was convicted of the murder of his wife, Kathleen Peterson.

In 2007, Lee testified as a prosecution expert witness at the first trial of Cal Harris, an upstate New York car dealer accused of killing his wife on the night of September 11, 2001. Since no body has ever been found, the state's best evidence of foul play was some medium-velocity castoff impact blood spatter on the walls of the house's garage and kitchen. Lee told the jury that it could only have come from someone lower than 29 inches (740 mm) above ground. Harris was convicted at that trial and a retrial after new evidence emerged, but ultimately acquitted at a fourth trial after his conviction got overturned on appeal.

In 2008, Lee was involved in the early stages of investigation in Orlando, Florida for the missing toddler Caylee Anthony.

==== Phil Spector trial ====
In May 2007, California Superior Court Judge Larry Paul Fidler, the judge in the Phil Spector murder trial, said that he had concluded Lee hid or destroyed a piece of evidence from the scene of actress Lana Clarkson's shooting. Lee denied the allegation and testified that he was astonished and insulted by claims by lawyers that he had collected an object that was not turned over to prosecutors as required by law. University of Southern California law professor Jean Rosenbluth said that Judge Fidler's ruling was "very narrow" and noted the judge had made no finding that Lee had lied on the stand or acted maliciously.

==== Allegations of error ====
In June 2019, the Connecticut Supreme Court concluded that Lee had erred in the murder trial testimony of (then) teenagers Shawn Henning and Ralph Birch; Lee said a towel tested positive for blood, but he had not tested it at all. Later tests found no blood. The Daily Beast questioned additional cases in which Lee had testified. At a June 17 press conference, Lee said that he had tested the towel, adding that chemical screening tests for blood had been done at the crime scene on the date of the homicide.

In July 2023, a federal court found that Lee had fabricated evidence in the Henning–Birch trial. Henning and Birch spent 30 years in prison before being cleared of the crime. In September 2023, the state of Connecticut agreed to settle Henning and Birch's federal wrongful conviction lawsuit against Lee, eight police investigators and the town of New Milford for $25.2 million.

== Personal life and death ==
Lee held dual Taiwanese and U.S. citizenship. Lee resided in Connecticut, where he lived with his wife Margaret Lee, whom he married in 1962, until her death on August 1, 2017. His wife worked as a teacher and then a researcher for the United States Department of Veterans Affairs Medical Center in West Haven, Connecticut. He had two children, Sherry and Stanley, with her.

He remarried on December 1, 2018, to Xiaping Jiang, CEO of Jiadi (Hong Kong) Co., Yangzhou Jiadi Clothing Co., Ltd, and Yangzhou Jiadi Senior Care Center.

Lee died after a brief illness at his home in Henderson, Nevada, on March 27, 2026, aged 87.

== Legacy ==
On November 5, 2016, the Henry C. Lee Museum of Forensic Sciences (Chinese: 李昌钰刑侦科学博物馆) was opened in his hometown of Rugao in Jiangsu, which is the first forensic science museum in the world. The new site opened in November 2023.
