= Kung Ming-hsin =

Taiwanese economist and politician (born 1964)

- 龔明鑫
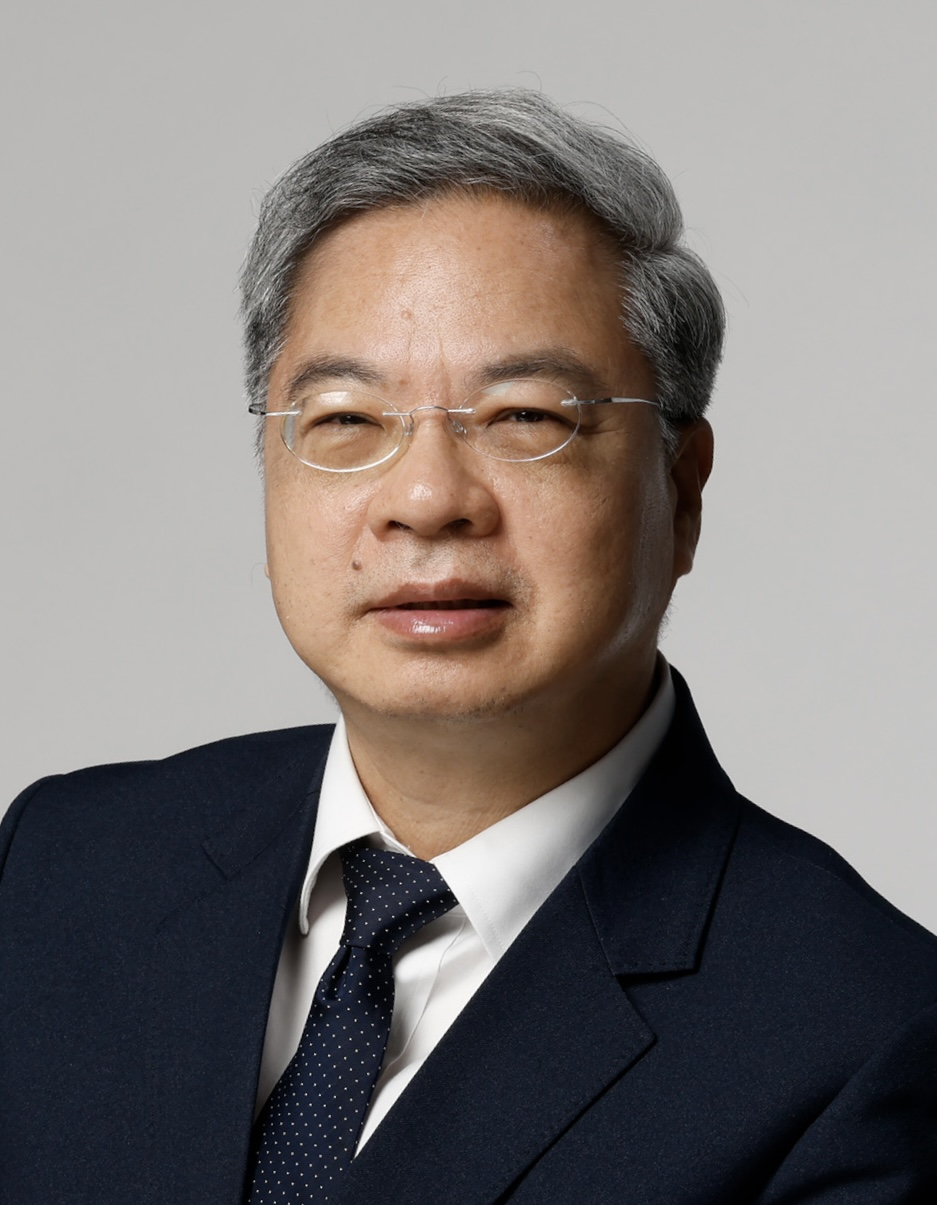
- Official portrait, 2026

34th Minister of Economic Affairs
- Incumbent
- Assumed office 1 September 2025
- Prime Minister: Cho Jung-tai
- Preceded by: J.W. Kuo

37th Secretary-General of the Executive Yuan
- In office 20 May 2024 – 1 September 2025
- Prime Minister: Cho Jung-tai
- Preceded by: Li Meng-yen
- Succeeded by: Chang Tun-han

6th Minister of National Development
- In office 20 May 2020 – 20 May 2024
- Prime Minister: Su Tseng-chang; Chen Chien-jen
- Preceded by: Chen Mei-ling
- Succeeded by: Paul Liu
Additional cabinet positions
Minister without Portfolio
In office 14 January 2019 – 20 May 2024
Prime Minister	Su Tseng-chang; Chen Chien-jen
Deputy Minister of Economic Affairs
In office 8 September 2017 – December 2018
Minister	Shen Jong-chin
Preceded by	Shen Jong-chin
Succeeded by	Tseng Wen-sheng; Wang Mei-hua
Deputy Minister of National Development
In office 20 May 2016 – 7 September 2017 Serving with Tseng Shu-cheng and Kao Shien-quey
Minister	Chen Tain-jy
Succeeded by	Chiou Jiunn-rong

Personal details
- Born: 3 February 1964 (age 62) Taipei, Taiwan
- Party: Independent
- Spouse: Chen Yu-shan
- Education: Fu Jen Catholic University (BA); National Taiwan University (MA); National Chung Hsing University (PhD)

Kung Ming-hsin (Chinese: 龔明鑫; pinyin: Gōng Míngxīn; born 3 February 1964) is a Taiwanese economist and politician who has served as Minister of Economic Affairs since 2025. He previously served in other cabinet positions, including Secretary-General of the Executive Yuan and minister of the National Development Council.

== Early life and education ==
Kung was born on 3 February 1964. He attended Donghu Elementary School in Taipei. He later graduated from the Affiliated Senior High School of National Taiwan Normal University, where he was a member of class 441. After high school, Kung graduated from Fu Jen Catholic University with a bachelor's degree in statistics in 1986.

In 1987, Kung enrolled at National Taiwan University, where he earned a master's degree in economics in 1989. Following his master's studies, Kung began working at the Taiwan Institute of Economic Research. He then earned his Ph.D. in economics from National Chung Hsing University in 1997. As a doctoral student, he studied under economist Wu Rong-i. His doctoral dissertation, completed under economist Chen Po-chih, was titled, An Empirical Study of the Sources of Growth in Taiwan's Manufacturing Industry and Improvements in Export Product Quality (我國製造業成長來源與出口品品質改善之實證研究).

== Political career ==
Kung was the vice president of the Taiwan Institute of Economic Research while working with Tsai Ing-wen's incoming presidential administration. He was appointed in April 2016 to the Lin Chuan-led Executive Yuan as the deputy minister of National Development Council. Kung was named Deputy Minister of Economic Affairs on 8 September 2017. He served in that role through December 2018, after which he was appointed a minister without portfolio in charge of economic affairs.
