= Huang Fu-yuan =

Taiwanese criminologist

- 黃富源

Minister of Directorate-General of Personnel Administration of the Republic of China
- In office 28 March 2012 – 20 May 2016
- Deputy: Yen Chiu-lai; Chang Nien-chung
- Preceded by: Wu Tai-cheng
- Succeeded by: Jay N. Shih

Personal details
- Born: 10 October 1956 (age 69)
- Education: Central Police University (BA, MS); Sam Houston State University (PhD)

Huang Fu-yuan or Frank Huang (Chinese: 黃富源; pinyin: Huáng Fùyuán; born 10 October 1956) is a Taiwanese criminologist. He was the Minister of the Directorate-General of Personnel Administration of the Executive Yuan from 28 March 2012 until 20 May 2016.

== Early life and education ==
Huang was born in Taiwan. He studied criminology at Central Police University, graduating with a bachelor's degree specializing in crime prevention in 1978 and a Master of Science (M.S.) in police administration in 1983. He then completed doctoral studies in the United States, where he earned his Ph.D. in criminal justice from Sam Houston State University in 1993 under criminology professor James W. Marquart. His doctoral dissertation was titled, "A Conceptual Examination of the Determinants of Occupational Attitudes of Jail Personnel to the Republic of China".
