= Eric Bond =

American economist

Eric W. Bond
- Born: April 13, 1953 (age 73)

Academic background
- Education: University of Rochester
- Doctoral advisor: Walter Oi; Ronald W. Jones

Academic work
- Discipline: International economics
- Institutions: Vanderbilt University
- Doctoral students: Chen Tain-jy
- Website: Information at IDEAS / RePEc

Eric W. Bond (born April 13, 1953) is an American economist. He specializes in international economics and economic theory. Bond is a professor of economics at Vanderbilt University since 2003.

After graduating from Lehigh University in 1974, Bond earned his Master's and Ph.D. from the University of Rochester.
