= Paul Liu (politician) =

Liu Jin-ching
- 劉鏡清
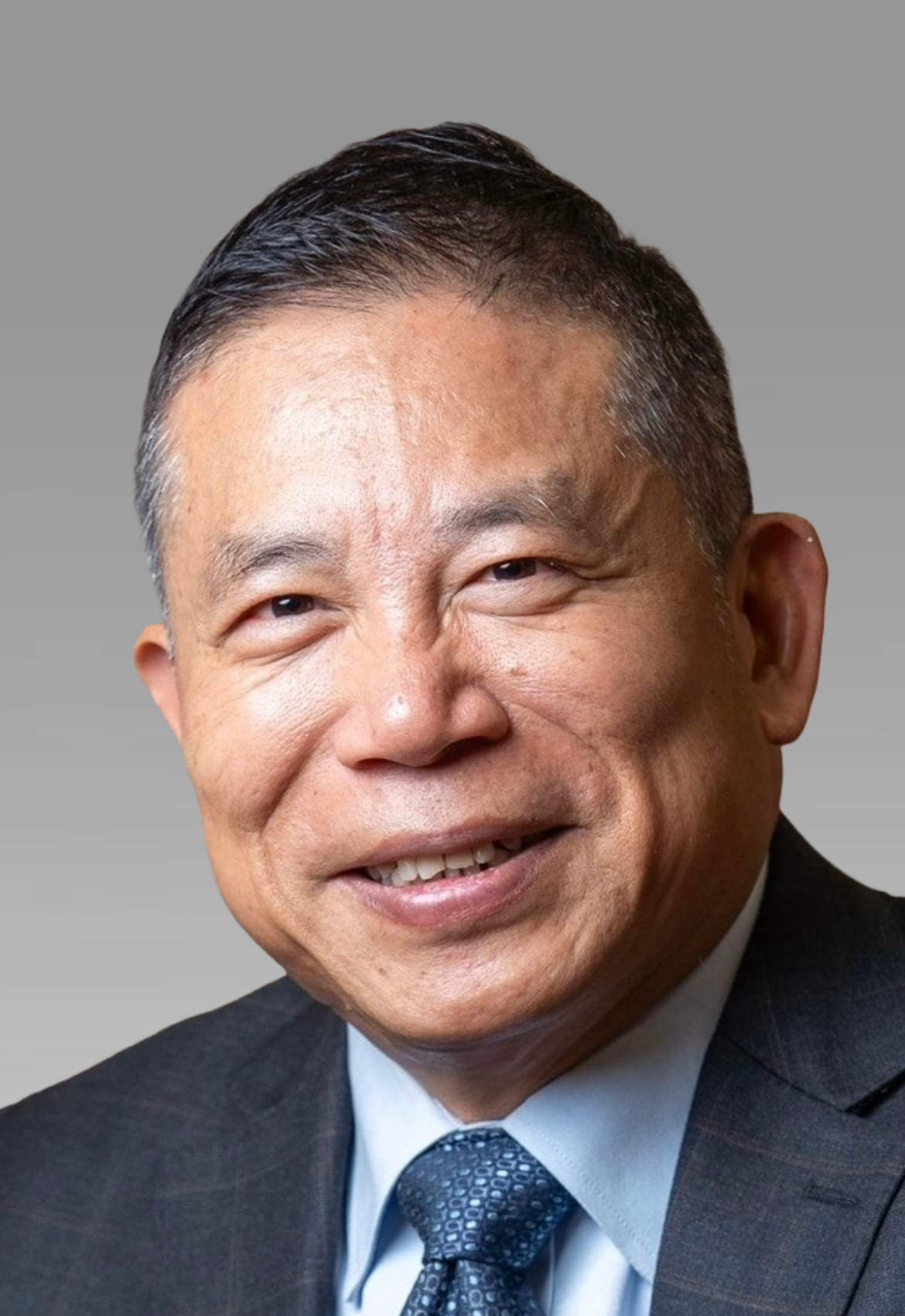
- Official portrait, 2024

7th Minister of National Development
- In office 20 May 2024 – 1 September 2025
- Prime Minister: Cho Jung-tai
- Preceded by: Kung Ming-hsin
- Succeeded by: Yeh Chun-hsien

Minister without Portfolio
- In office 20 May 2024 – 1 September 2025
- Prime Minister: Cho Jung-tai
- Preceded by: Kung Ming-hsin
- Succeeded by: Yeh Chun-hsien

Personal details
- Born: April 15, 1963 (age 63)
- Party: Independent
- Education: Chung Yuan Christian University (BS); National Taiwan University (MBA)

Paul Liu Jin-ching (Chinese: 劉鏡清; pinyin: Liú Jìngqīng) is a Taiwanese business executive and politician who was the minister of the National Development Council from 2024 to 2025.

Liu worked for IBM Taiwan as an executive for global business services, became director of IBM's General Business division in 2011, and from 2012 to 2021 joined PricewaterhouseCoopers Taiwan as executive vice president and chairman. On 16 April 2024, Liu was appointed leader of the National Development Council in president-elect William Lai's incoming administration, succeeding Kung Ming-hsin in the role.
