= Huang Ming-chao =

Taiwanese police officer

Huang Ming-chao (Chinese: 黃明昭; born 1962) is a Taiwanese police officer.

By 2012, Huang was the director of criminal investigations for the Taipei City Police Department. In this capacity, he was questioned about the department's actions during the Sunflower Student Movement. By 2017, Huang had become deputy director of the National Police Agency's Criminal Investigation Bureau. In 2019, Huang was promoted to first-in-command of the CIB, from his previous post as chief of police in Keelung. As CIB head, he commented on the tracking of drug traffickers and organized crime syndicates operating in Taiwan. In September of that year, Huang was tasked with visiting Kaohsiung as the city confronted incidents of violence throughout the month, attributed in part to a dispute between internet celebrities. After the Executive Yuan proposed regulations on modified air guns, Huang stated that the National Police Agency would publish a list of banned modifications. Huang remained with the Criminal Investigation Bureau through 2020. When Chen Chi-mai took office as Mayor of Kaohsiung in 2021, Huang accepted an appointment as director of the Kaohsiung Police Department. While leading the Kaohsiung Police Department, Huang commented on the police investigation of the 2021 Kaohsiung building fire. After Chen Ja-chin's request for early retirement was granted, Huang was appointed director-general of the National Police Agency.
