= National Water Life Saving Association Republic of China =

Lifesaving organization in Taiwan

National Water Life Saving Association (NWLSA), also known as Chinese Taipei Water Life Saving Association (CTWLSA) (Chinese: 中華民國水上救生協會), is the major lifesaving organization in Taiwan. The organization's members are mainly volunteer lifesavers, police officers, firefighters and civilians who are enthusiastic about water sports, water safety awareness and water rescue events.

== About ==
The National Water Life Saving Association of the Republic of China (N.W.L.S.A) is also known as Chinese Taipei Water Lifesaving Association (C.T.W.L.S.A) internationally. C.T.W.L.S.A is used when participating in international competition such as World Games and Rescue World Championship. N.W.L.S.A runs as the major authority certifying lifesaving training and licensing throughout Taiwan. The Association was first launched in 1970 in Taipei with the aid of Surf Life Saving Australia (S.L.S.A) introduced by Douglas Darby. The Association joined International Life Saving Federation in 1994. Soon later, other branches in different provinces were established to promote lifesaving and water safety awareness. The mission of the association is to promote water safety awareness and reduce water drown-rate around the island. It is one of several non-Olympic sports associations recognized by the Chinese Taipei Olympic Committee.

== Mission and vision ==
The organization mission as follow:

1. Coordinate relevant resources to promote a culture of safety and to promote lifesaving techniques.
2. Promote lifesaving skills and provide qualified training.
3. Set up rescue service stations and effectively reduce drown-rate and rescue patients.
4. Assist all water related events to ensure water safety.

The Vision of the Association is to promote water safety, popularize lifesavers, provide essential trainings, prevent drowning and maintain a safe and comfortable environment as a service.

== License and certificate ==
1. Junior life saving Certificate [water self-sustaining technique] – For people who intend to take the course and under 16. They will also need to take full course of lifesaving class. However, when they pass the course and received their license, they can not become a professional lifeguard due to under age.
2. Lifesaving training course [certified lifeguard license when complete] – For people who wish to become a lifeguard and age above 16. They undergo a series of training including water self-sustaining technique, rescue victims, swimming technique, pool rescue, surf rescue, swift water rescue and CPR. The training also includes a beach exercise on rip currents and a river exercise on hydraulic currents. Two days' probationary practice before obtain the license.
3. Lifesaving instructor course – Eligible for people obtained Life Saver license over one year. Butterfly stroke swim technique is required. Training courses including enhanced beach and swift water rescue training, familiar with IRB crew/ driving operation. After course complete, candidates require assisting and teaching life saver training course as probation and obtain the license.
4. IRB training class – Mostly for police and firefighters and gradually promote to lifeguards and life saving instructors as the IRB rescue operation become more and popular on the beach and river side.
5. MISC: CPR, AED, lifeguard referee, surf rescue, swift water rescue.

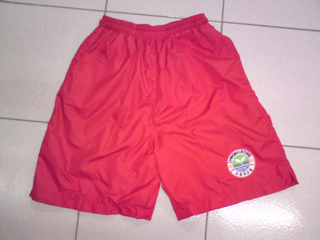
Shorts worn by the lifeguards

== Current statistics ==
Ever since the association was founded, there are multiple training all over the country. The C.T.W.L.S.A released a current statistics on the organization status.

Lifeguards: 82,964 persons

Lifeguard instructor: 10,787 persons

Class ‘A’ instructor: 130 persons

Class ‘A’ referee: 84 persons

== Local branches ==
The main association is located in Taipei City; however, there are local association which provides the exact training, after the training, the main association sends the examiner to each local association and the results are sent to the taipei headquarters which sends licenses to qualified lifeguards.

Taipei

–Taipei City Water Lifesaving Volunteer Association

–Taipei City Water Lifesaving Instructor Association

–Taipei City East Water Lifesaving Association

–Taipei Country Water Lifesaving Association

–Taipei Country Water Safety Lifesaving Association

–Taipei Country Water Lifesaving Instructor Association

–Keelung City Water Safety Lifesaving Association

Taoyuan

Taoyuan Country Water Lifesaving Association

Taoyuan Country Division Association

Hsinchu

–Hsinchu City Water Lifesaving Association

–Hsinchu Country Water Lifesaving Association

Miaoli

Miaoli Country Water Lifesaving Association

Taichung

–Taichung City Water Lifesaving Association

–Taichung Country Division Association

–Taichung Country Water Lifesaving Instructor Association

Changhua

–Changhua Country Water Lifesaving Association

Nantou

–Nantou Lifeguard Association

Yunlin

–Yunlin Country Water Lifesaving Association

Chiayi

–Chiayi City Water Lifesaving Association

–Chiayi Country Water Lifesaving Association

Tainan

–National Water Lifesaving Association Tainan City Branch

–Tainan City Phoenix Lifesaving Association

–Tainan Country Phoenix Lifesaving Association

Kaohsiung

–Kaohsiung City Water Lifesaving Association

–Kaohsiung City Port Lifesaving Association

–Kaohsiung Country Water Lifesaving Association

–Kaohsiung Country Water Safety Rescue Association

Pingtung

–Pingtung Country Water Lifesaving Association

Yilan

–Yilan Country Water Lifesaving Association

Hualien

–Hualien Country Water Lifesaving Association

Taitung

–Taitung Country Water Lifesaving Association
