= Central Police University =

Police academy in Guishan, Taoyuan City, Taiwan

- 中央警察大學
- Former name: Central Police College (1936–1995)
- Motto: 誠
- Motto in English: Honesty
- Type: Police university
- Established: September 1, 1936; 90 years ago
- Parent institution: Ministry of the Interior
- President: Huang Ming-chao
- Location: Guishan District, Taoyuan, 333322, Taiwan; 25.047211°N 121.352361°E
- Website: www.cpu.edu.tw

Central Police University (CPU; Chinese: 中央警察大學; pinyin: Zhōngyāng Jǐngchá Dàxué) is a public police university in Guishan District, Taoyuan, Taiwan. Administered by the Ministry of the Interior and supervised by the Ministry of Education, it specializes in criminology, police science, and crime science.

Founded in Nanjing, China, in 1936 as the Central Police College, the institution relocated to Chongqing during the Second Sino-Japanese War and returned to Nanjing following Japan's surrender in 1945. It subsequently moved to Taiwan during the Chinese Civil War, suspending operations in 1950 before being re-established in Taipei in 1954. The college relocated to its present campus in Taoyuan in 1977 and was reorganized as a university in 1995.

The university comprises two colleges, the College of Justice Administration and the College of Police Science and Technology, offering programs in police administration, law, criminal investigation, forensic science, and other fields. The university offers undergraduate and graduate degree programs, as well as professional training for law enforcement personnel. Its undergraduate curriculum combines instruction with law enforcement training.

== History ==
=== Founding and wartime period (1936–1945) ===
Central Police University was established as the Central Police College (中央警官學校) on 1 September 1936 in Maqun, Nanjing, China, following the merger of the Ministry of the Interior's Higher Police Officers School and the Zhejiang Provincial Police School, as part of the Nationalist government's efforts to consolidate police education in China. Chiang Kai-shek served as the school's first president, while Li Shizhen (李士珍), its director of education, was responsible for its daily administration.

Li Shizhen (李士珍) in 1949, an early administrator and later president of the Central Police College

The college's original campus was constructed at Wukesong in Maqun, where its facilities included classrooms, laboratories, dormitories, a library, and police training facilities. Its initial curriculum combined police administration, legal studies, political education, military instruction, and practical training in criminal investigation and forensic techniques. The college offered regular courses lasting two or three years, alongside specialized training for serving police officers.

Following the outbreak of the Second Sino-Japanese War in 1937, the college relocated to the southern bank of the Yangtze River in Chongqing, accompanying the Nationalist government's westward withdrawal during the war. Its original campus in Nanjing was destroyed during the fighting surrounding the Japanese capture of the city in December 1937. During the war, the college expanded its training programs to include specialized police courses and advanced training for police officers. A special police training program bearing the college's name was also established in Hunan under the direction of Dai Li, who headed the Nationalist government's military intelligence organization.

In January 1944, the college established an advanced police administration research program to train senior police officials for provincial leadership positions. In September of that year, it established a special training course for prospective police administrators in Taiwan in preparation for the island's anticipated transfer from Japanese administration to the Republic of China. The college also selected graduates for further study in the United States.

=== Postwar relocation and development in Taiwan (1945–1994) ===
The first issue of Central Police College Quarterly, published in 1947

Following Japan's surrender in 1945, the college returned to Nanjing and established its headquarters outside Guanghua Gate, rather than returning to its destroyed prewar campus at Maqun. During the postwar period, the college expanded its training programs for military officers transitioning into police service and other specialized police personnel. It established six branch campuses in Xi'an, Guangzhou, Dihua, Chongqing, Beiping, and Shenyang, as well as police officer training programs in Shanghai and Taiwan. The combined enrollment of its headquarters, branches, and training programs exceeded 12,000 students during this time.

During the final stages of the Chinese Civil War in 1949, the college relocated first to Guangzhou and subsequently to Chongqing before moving to Taiwan. After arriving in Taiwan, it was consolidated with an existing police officer training program in Taipei. In June 1950, the college was ordered to discontinue operations as part of government administrative reductions, although the Taipei training program continued providing instruction to serving police officers. In October 1954, the college was re-established in Taipei and resumed its regular educational programs. In 1957, with authorization from the Ministry of the Interior and Ministry of Education, it introduced a four-year undergraduate program, initially comprising departments of police administration and criminal investigation. The college subsequently expanded its academic offerings to include public security, crime prevention, fire science, traffic policing, foreign affairs policing, administrative management, forensic science, and law.

In 1970, the college established a graduate institute of police administration offering master's degrees. It began admitting female students in 1974. In 1977, the college relocated from Taipei to a new campus in Guishan District, Taoyuan, which became its permanent location. Beginning in 1986, the college admitted third-year transfer students to provide opportunities for further education to graduates of the Taiwan Police School's junior college police officer program. In 1994, it began offering doctoral education through a crime prevention division within its graduate institute of police administration.

=== University status (1995–present) ===
On 12 December 1995, the Legislative Yuan approved legislation reorganizing the Central Police College as Central Police University. The legislation was promulgated by President Lee Teng-hui on 20 December 1995.

In 1996, the university established an independent doctoral program within its Graduate Institute of Crime Prevention, succeeding the doctoral division created in 1994. In 1997, it established a two-year technical education program for serving police personnel pursuing further studies. Additional doctoral programs were established in forensic science in 2001 and police policy in 2006. In 2013, the university established the College of Justice Administration and the College of Police Science and Technology.

== Campus ==
The main entrance to Central Police University in 2025

The campus of Central Police University is located at No. 56 Shuren Road in Guishan District, Taoyuan, on the Linkou Plateau in northern Taiwan. The university relocated to the site from Taipei in 1977, when the surrounding area was largely undeveloped.

The campus contains the Lixing Building (力行樓), Teaching Building, Research Building, Information Building, Science Building, Fire Science Building, and Science and Criminal Forensics Building, alongside facilities for police training, athletics, and student accommodation. Other facilities include an auditorium, a flag-raising square, an athletics stadium, a swimming pool, and a student activities center.

=== Academic and training facilities ===
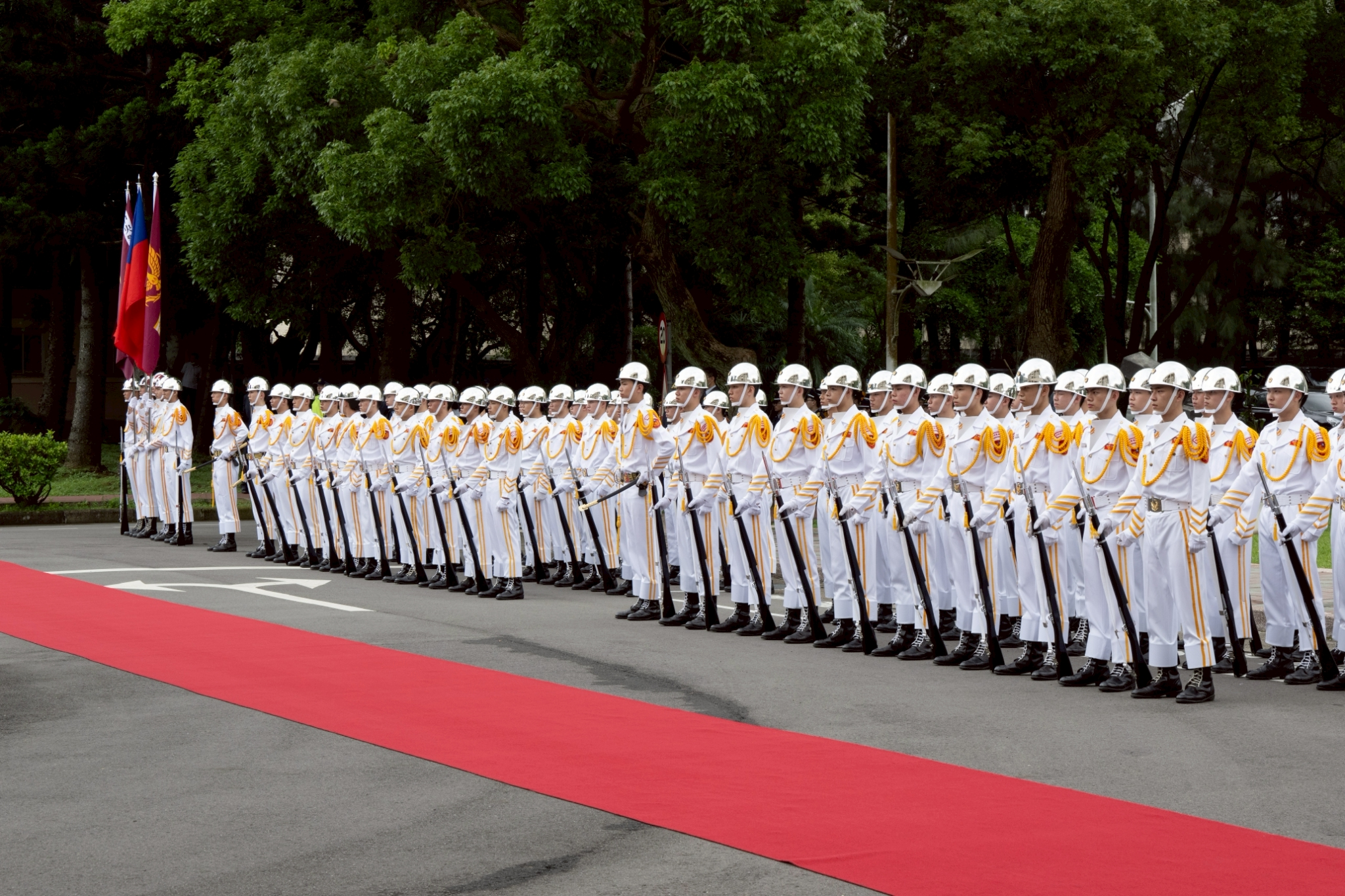
The university's student honor guard in 2025

The university's academic facilities include the Science and Criminal Forensics Building, which contains specialized laboratories and instructional facilities for forensic investigation. An investigation and forensic technology building was completed and opened in April 2016.

A five-story shooting training complex was inaugurated on 9 December 2016, following a construction project costing approximately NT$407 million. The building has a total floor area of 9,531 square meters and comprises five above-ground stories and one basement level.

The Multi-purpose Police Skills Gymnasium (警技館) contains facilities for judo, wrestling, basketball, volleyball, indoor running, physical fitness, and swimming in a heated pool. The university's older gymnasium, completed in 1978, originally accommodated kendo, table tennis, and basic police training in its basement. In 2024, the basement was renovated into a multifunctional exercise and training area.

In July 2025, the university reopened its former Science Building as the Ching-An Building (警安樓) following renovations that included exterior improvements, a new elevator, interior refurbishment, and upgraded accessibility facilities. The renovated building houses the Department of Security Police, the Disaster Management Research Institute, the university's medical office, and its mental health center.

=== Library and World Police Museum ===
The university library maintains collections specializing in police science and provides electronic databases and digital research resources for faculty and students. Its facilities include a Leisure Reading Zone, a Research and Retrieval Zone, a collection of books donated by forensic scientist Henry Lee, and a student-designed reading and discussion area.

The university also houses the World Police Museum (世界警察博物館), which officially opened on 28 June 1993 following more than six years of planning under former university president Yan Shixi (顏世錫). Its exhibition facilities occupy approximately 1,200 ping (around 3,967 square meters) across three levels. The ground floor contains the University History Museum and the Republic of China Police Museum, while the two basement exhibition levels accommodate collections devoted to international policing and Chinese painting and calligraphy.

The University History Museum preserves documents and artifacts illustrating the institution's development since its founding in 1936, including official correspondence, badges, uniforms, publications, and memorabilia donated by alumni. The Republic of China Police Museum exhibits historical materials relating to law enforcement institutions and different branches of police service. The International Police Museum contains exhibits representing police organizations from countries across Asia, Europe, Africa, the Americas, and Oceania.

=== Residential facilities and public art ===
Brave Rescue, a sculpture by Ju Ming on the lawn in front of Lixing Building

The campus contains several student residence buildings, including Ching-Ying Building (警英樓), Ching-Hsien Building (警賢樓), and Friendship Building (友誼樓). The Ching-Hsien Building underwent a renovation of its student rooms in 2023.

The campus contains several public sculptures, including Brave Rescue (奮勇救人), a bronze sculpture by Taiwanese artist Ju Ming depicting the rescue of a child. The work stands on the lawn in front of Lixing Building and was commissioned to represent self-sacrifice in the service of others. Another installation, Affection, Sincerity, and the Pursuit of Perfection (親愛精誠、止於至善), is a 1992 steel sculpture by sculptor Yuyu Yang featuring stylized police doves and situated in the plaza outside the World Police Museum.

The campus also includes Lequnxuan (樂群軒), a recreational and dining facility originally established on 1 April 1984 to provide a gathering place for students and faculty. Located beside Zhongjing Lake (中警湖), the facility reopened in November 2023 after a renovation.

== Academics ==
The university specializes in police science and trains police personnel under the administration of the Ministry of the Interior and under the supervision of the Ministry of Education. As of 2025, the university consists of 14 undergraduate departments, 14 master's programs, and four doctoral programs.

=== Academic organization ===
Central Police University graduates during its 2017 commencement ceremony

The university organizes its academic departments into two colleges, the College of Justice Administration (警政管理學院) and the College of Police Science and Technology (警察科技學院), alongside a General Education Center.

The College of Justice Administration has seven departments: Administration Police, Public Security, Crime Prevention and Corrections, Foreign Affairs Police, Border Police, Administrative Management, and Law. Its academic programs cover police administration and policy, national security, criminology, immigration and border control, public administration, and legal studies. The Department of Law focuses on the legal aspects of policing.

The College of Police Science and Technology consists of seven departments: Criminal Investigation, Fire Science, Traffic Science, Information Management, Forensic Science, Maritime Police, and Special Police. The college's programs encompass criminal investigation techniques, fire prevention and disaster response, traffic management, information technology, forensic analysis, maritime law enforcement, and critical infrastructure protection. The college also administers the Graduate School of Disaster Management, which provides specialized education in disaster prevention and management.

=== Graduate education and research ===
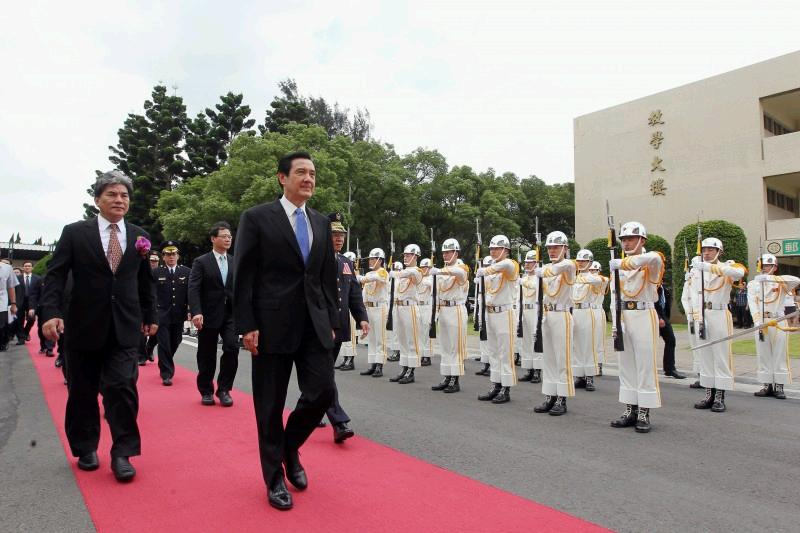
President Ma Ying-jeou and Interior Minister Lee Hong-yuan reviewing the university's honor guard during its 2012 graduation ceremony

The university's postgraduate programs provide advanced education in police policy, public security, law, criminology, criminal investigation, forensic science, and related disciplines. As of 2026, the university has four graduate institutes which host doctoral programs: Crime Prevention and Corrections, Forensic Science, Police Policy, and Criminal Investigation.

The university maintains five research centers: the Criminal Justice Research Center, Crime Problems Research Center, Digital Forensics Research Center, Investigation and Forensic Science Research Center, and Intelligent Technology Law Enforcement Research Center. It also publishes academic journals including Police Science Quarterly (警學叢刊) and Law Enforcement Review (執法新知論衡).

=== Undergraduate admissions ===
President Lai Ching-te (right) at the university's 2026 commencement

Undergraduate admissions are administered independently of the general university allocation process, with applicants initially assessed using Taiwan's General Scholastic Ability Test (GSAT) results. Candidates are divided into a "natural sciences" group and a "social sciences" group according to their intended fields of study. Applicants who pass the initial academic selection must undergo an interview, a medical examination, and a physical fitness test before admission. In 2026, the university had 322 enrolled in its undergraduate programs, 258 of whom were men and 64 of whom were women.

Students enrolled in the four-year undergraduate programs receive government aid, including tuition waivers, accommodation, meals, uniforms, and university-produced textbooks. Upon graduation, students who pass the relevant civil service special examinations may be assigned to police, fire, maritime law-enforcement, intelligence, immigration, or correctional agencies according to their specializations. Graduates who pass the qualifying examinations and enter government service are usually required to serve for at least four years.

== Presidents ==
The university has had 23 presidents since its founding in 1936.

No.	President	Term of office
1	Chiang Kai-shek	1 September 1936 – 30 September 1947
2	Lee Shih-chen (李士珍)	1 October 1947 – February 1949
3	Chen Yu-huei (陳玉輝)	February 1949 – June 1949
4	Lee Chian (李謇)	July 1949 – June 1950
5	Lai Kan (樂幹)	1954 – April 1956
6	Chao Long-wen (趙龍文)	April 1956 – November 1966
7	Mei Ko-wang (梅可望)	November 1966 – December 1973
8	Lee Hsin-tang (李興唐)	December 1973 – April 1983
9	Chou Shih-bin (周世斌)	April 1983 – May 1987
10	Yen Shih-hsi (顏世錫)	May 1987 – May 1995
11	Yao Kao-chiao (姚高橋)	May 1995 – June 1996
12	Chen Bi (陳璧)	June 1996 – July 1997
13	Hsieh Jui-chih (謝瑞智)	July 1997 – August 2000
14	Chu Cheng-ming (朱拯民)	August 2000 – August 2001
15	Tsai Te-huei (蔡德輝)	August 2001 – March 2006
16	Hsieh Ing-dan (謝銀黨)	March 2006 – 20 June 2008
17	Hou Yu-ih (侯友宜)	21 June 2008 – 24 December 2010
18	Hsieh Hsiu-neng (謝秀能)	February 2011 – 16 January 2014
19	Tiao Chien-sheng (刁建生)	16 January 2014 – January 2019
Acting	Chuang Te-sen (莊德森)	January – 13 February 2019
20	Li Wen-ming (黎文明)	13 February 2019 – 15 January 2021
21	Chen Che-wen (陳檡文)	January 2021 – 31 December 2022
Acting	Su Chih-chiang (蘇志強)	1–15 January 2023
22	Yang Yuan-ming (楊源明)	16 January 2023 – 15 July 2025
Acting	Chen Hui-tang (陳惠堂)	16–31 July 2025
23	Huang Ming-chao (黃明昭)	1 August 2025 – present

== Notable alumni ==
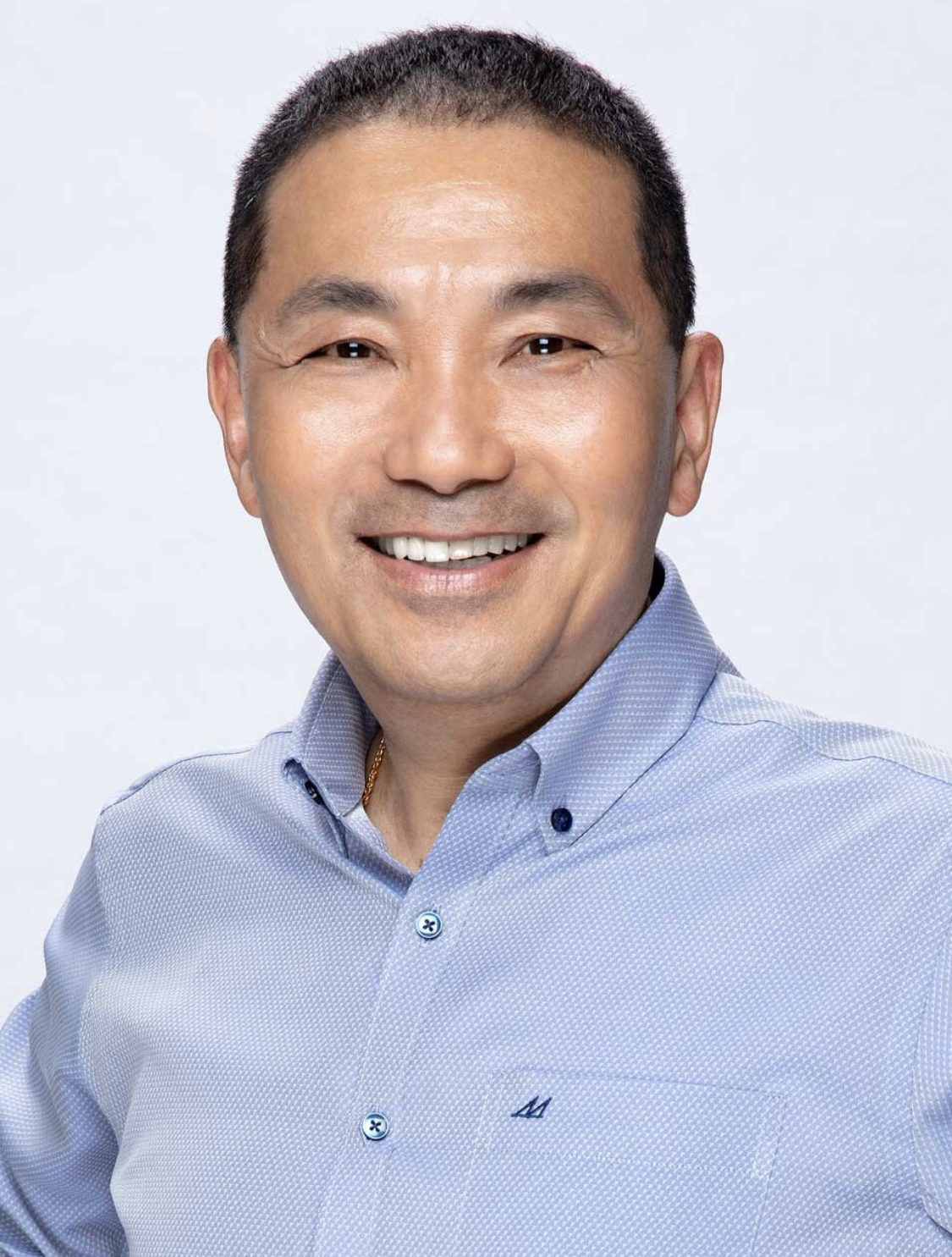
Hou Yu-ih

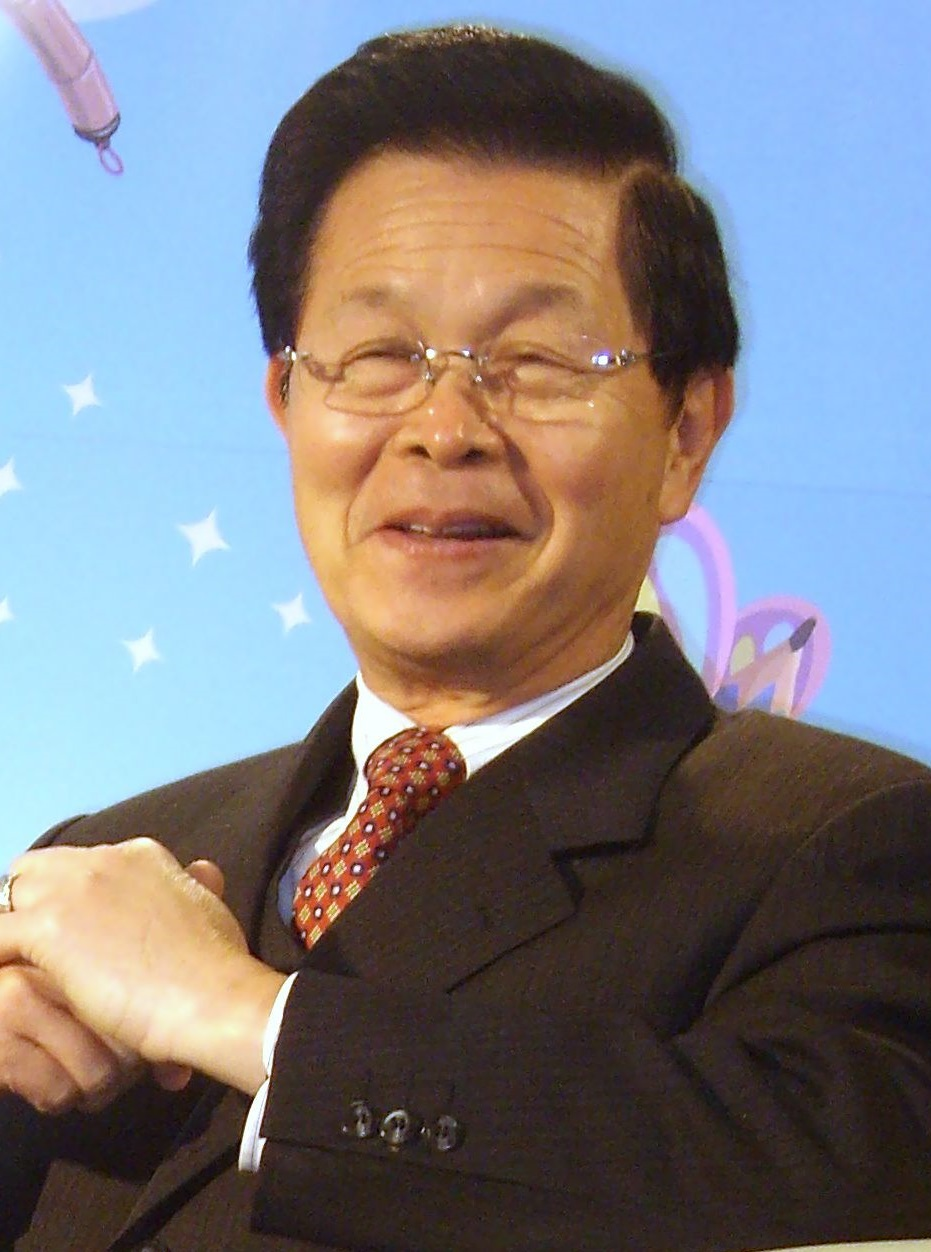
Chao Shou-po

Alumni of Central Police University include notable people in law enforcement, government, the judiciary, academia, and business. In politics, graduates include Hou Yu-ih, a member of the college's 45th class who served as director-general of the National Police Agency and CPU's president before becoming mayor of New Taipei City in 2018. Chao Shou-po, a graduate of the 28th class, served as chairman of the Council of Labor Affairs, secretary-general of the Executive Yuan, and chairman of the Taiwan Provincial Government. Graduates elected to the Legislative Yuan include Tsao Erh-chung, a former police chief in Lienchiang County, and Chang Hsien-yao, who subsequently entered cross-strait policymaking. Huang Fu-yuan, a criminologist who earned both his bachelor's and master's degrees at the university, served as minister of the Directorate-General of Personnel Administration from 2012 to 2016.

The university has produced several senior officials in Taiwan's law-enforcement agencies. Wang Ginn-wang, a graduate of the college's 38th class, served as director-general of the National Police Agency before becoming deputy director-general of the National Security Bureau and head of the Coast Guard Administration. Huang Ming-chao, a graduate of the 51st class and former director-general of the National Police Agency, was appointed president of Central Police University in 2025.

Alumni in forensic science and academia include Henry Lee, a graduate of the college's 24th class who became a forensic scientist in the United States and served as commissioner of the Connecticut Department of Public Safety from 1998 to 2000. Lin Shan-tien, a graduate of the 26th class, became a scholar of criminal law and held professorships at National Chengchi University and National Taiwan University. Lee Chen-shan (李震山), a graduate of the 39th class, became a professor of constitutional and administrative law and served as a justice of the Judicial Yuan from 2007 to 2015.

== See also ==
- Ministry of the Interior (Republic of China)
- List of universities in Taiwan
  - List of schools in the Republic of China reopened in Taiwan
- World Police Museum
- Taiwan Police College
