= Joseph Hamburger =

American historian (1922–1997)

- Born: 1922
- Died: August 21, 1997 (aged 74–75); New Haven, Connecticut, U.S.
- Known for: 19th-century British intellectual history
- Title: Pelatiah Perit Professor of Political and Social Science

Academic background
- Education: University of Chicago (PhD)

Academic work
- Discipline: History, political science
- Institutions: Yale University

Joseph Hamburger (1922 – August 21, 1997, New Haven, Connecticut) was an American historian.

He earned his doctorate from the Committee on Social Thought at the University of Chicago. His academic career at Yale University spanned 35 years, from 1957 to 1992. In 1990 he was appointed the Pelatiah Perit Professor of Political and Social Science. His work focused on nineteenth century Britain, with studies on James Mill, John Stuart Mill and Thomas Macaulay. His obituarists claimed that he made an immense contribution to historical knowledge through his work on nineteenth century intellectual history and called him a sturdy advocate of "the fundamental principles of individual liberty and representative democracy".

== Works ==
- James Mill and the Art of Revolution (Yale: Yale University Press, 1963).
- Intellectuals in Politics: John Stuart Mill and the Philosophic Radicals, Volume 14 (Yale: Yale University Press, 1965).
- Macaulay and the Whig Tradition. Chicago: University of Chicago Press. 1976 – via Internet Archive.
- John Stuart Mill on Liberty and Control (Princeton: Princeton University Press, 1999).
