= Chen Hsueh-ping =

Chinese Educator and Politician (1901–1999)

- 陳雪屏
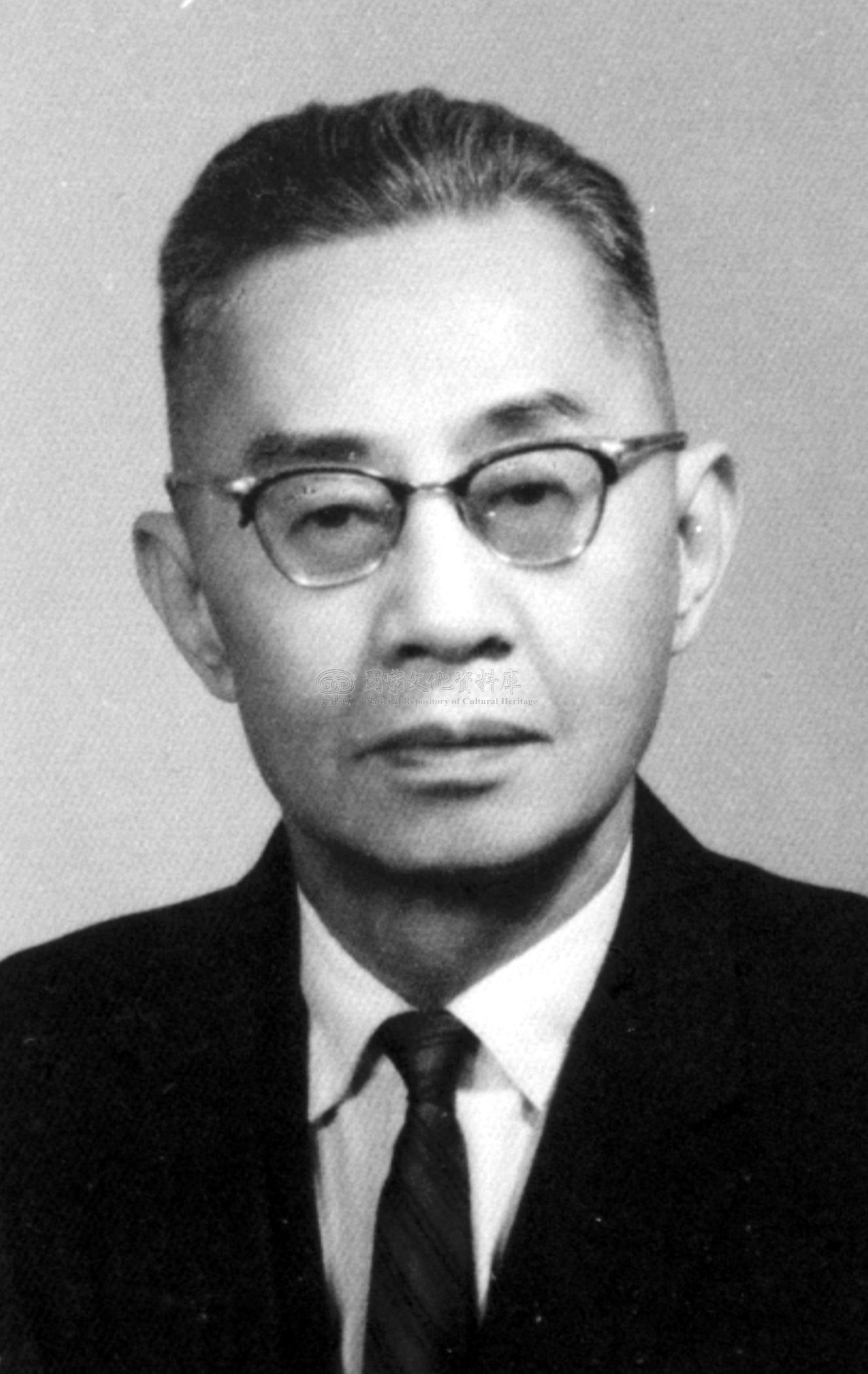
- Chen, 1966

6th Secretary-General of the Executive Yuan
- In office 14 July 1958 – 29 November 1967
- Preceded by: Chen Ching-yu
- Succeeded by: Chiang Yen-shih

Personal details
- Born: November 1, 1901 Jiangsu, Qing Empire
- Died: April 12, 1999 (aged 97) Taiwan
- Party: Kuomintang
- Relations: Yu Ying-shih (son-in-law)
- Education: Peking University (BA); Columbia University (MA)
- Occupation: Educator, psychologist, politician

Chen Hsueh-ping (November 1, 1901 – April 12, 1999) was a Chinese educator, psychologist, and politician in the Republic of China. He was a member of the Tsotanhui Clique within the Kuomintang.

== Biography ==
Chen was born into a banking family; his father, Chen Shuliu, served as the head of the Bank of Communications in Liaoning under Zhang Zuolin's rule in Northeast China.

After earning his master's degree in psychology from Columbia University, Chen returned to China and taught at Northeastern University, Beijing Normal University, and Peking University. Following the outbreak of the Second Sino-Japanese War, he joined the National Southwestern Associated University. His efforts to defuse student protests drew the attention of Kang Tse, a close associate of Chiang Kai-shek, which led to his appointment as Minister of Youth in the Three Principles of the People Youth Corps.

Following the war, Chen returned to Peking University. During the 1946 Shen Chong case, which involved the rape of a female student by U.S. military personnel, Chen not only questioned whether Shen was enrolled at the university but also publicly criticized her for walking alone at night. These remarks, combined with the later revelation that Shen Chong was both a student and a relative of Chen, sparked nationwide anti-American student demonstrations and widespread public outrage.

During the Chinese Civil War, Chen worked alongside Zhu Jiahua, Fu Sinian, Hang Liwu, and Chiang Ching-kuo to lead efforts to relocate academics from mainland China to Taiwan—a campaign to as the "rescue of intellectuals."

From 1950 to 1952, Chen served as Director of the First Department under the KMT's Party Reform Program, where he was responsible for overseeing and guiding local party branches across Taiwan. In 1953, he joined the Department of Psychology at National Taiwan University as a professor and helped lay the groundwork for the university's graduate research programs.

By the 1960s, Chen's political fortunes began to decline. He grew increasingly distrusted by Chiang Kai-shek due to his close ties with liberal intellectuals such as Hu Shih and Wang Shijie. Chiang reportedly described Chen in his diary as "surrounded by reactionaries" and accused him of "leveraging Hu Shih to constrain the party." Although Chiang claimed to exercise restraint, Chen was effectively sidelined from political life and shifted his focus mainly to psychology and academia. His remaining influence in government circles dissipated entirely following the death of his key political patron, Chen Cheng, in 1965.

Chen died in 1999 at the age of 97.

=== Leading Educational reforms ===
At the invitation of Chen Cheng, reflecting on his appointment as Director-General of the Department of Education, Taiwan Provincial Government, Chen attributed the Nationalist government's defeat on the mainland in part to the lack of a coherent educational policy. He stated:

During the closing years of the War of Resistance, the nation's finances were placed under extraordinary strain. In the final two or three years, material hardship gradually came to overwhelm the spirit. After several of our most distinguished universities had been relocated to the interior, it proved impossible to restore or expand their original facilities, and many forms of scholarly research could no longer be carried on. It was precisely at this juncture that the Communist bandits exploited the situation, infiltrating educational and cultural circles and deliberately fomenting disturbances.

Following victory in the war, these conditions ought to have improved. Unfortunately, however, the Communist bandits, having received massive assistance from the Soviet Union, had by then greatly strengthened themselves. They expanded their activities still further, extending their penetration from educational and cultural circles into every sector of society. At the same time, after eight years of exhausting resistance, our nation was burdened by accumulated fatigue, while the postwar recovery and the administration of the recovered territories revealed many serious shortcomings. These circumstances enabled the Communists to carry out their designs.

Many within intellectual circles, dissatisfied with existing conditions, even came to defy the Government. From 1947 until the spring of 1949, unrest gradually spread throughout the schools. In the great cities of Shanghai, Nanking, Peiping, and Wuhan, student demonstrations became an almost daily occurrence. At that time, moreover, many university professors adopted an attitude of aloof detachment toward the political situation. Believing that education ought not concern itself with politics, they made no effort whatever to correct the conduct of the young. As a consequence, the nation's youth lost their proper direction. Education itself was deprived of its central purpose; the morale of society was thereby undermined, and the deterioration of the national situation was further accelerated.— Chen Hsueh-ping

According to the 2006 biography Rebuilding the Foundations of Education in Taiwan: Chen Hsueh-ping (1901–1999), compiled by Cheng Yu-ching, then Vice President for Academic Affairs at the Taipei Municipal University of Education, and published by the National Academy for Educational Research, Chen believed that the failure of education in mainland China stemmed from the absence of state planning, and consequently made "planned education" (計畫教育) the centerpiece of his educational administration in Taiwan. On 30 May 1950, he promulgated the Implementing Measures for the Educational Program in the Extraordinary Period, which established a comprehensive framework for reforming schools and social education institutions, marking the first major educational reform in postwar Taiwan.

In 1949, following the relocation of a large number of Nationalist military forces and institutions to Taiwan, Chen led officials of the Provincial Department of Education, together with education experts and scholars, in drafting a series of educational regulations and administrative measures. These included the Guidelines for Strengthening National Spirit Education in Schools at All Levels in Taiwan Province, the Outline for Curriculum Adjustment in Schools at All Levels in Taiwan Province, and the Outline for Implementing Military Training in Secondary Schools and Above in Taiwan Province. He also organized anti-communist education in Taiwan. To raise teaching standards, the Department issued the Measures for Improving the Quality of Teachers at All Levels in June 1949, gradually phasing out unqualified instructors through summer training programs and competitive examinations. Chen also replaced numerous school principals with figures who later became prominent educators, including Ho I-hsin of Taipei Municipal Jianguo High School, Huang Zheng of National Taiwan Normal University Affiliated High School, Chiang Hsueh-chu of Taipei First Girls' High School, Pan Chen-chiu of Taipei Municipal Cheng Kung High School, and Hsin Chih-ping of Hsinchu High School. Per-student expenditure increased from NT$157 to NT$311 for primary students and from NT$264 to NT$1,109 for vocational students between 1949 and 1951. Chen allocated NT$8 billion (old currency) from the Resources Commission to purchase books and equipment for schools, and arranged for Japanese reparations materials to be distributed to educational institutions.

Chen established the Provincial Administrative College—a two-year institution later evolved into National Taipei University—to train local civil servants, producing a generation of Taiwanese administrators including Hsu Li-teh. He also introduced a five-year adult education program that established 3,000 supplementary classes and enrolled approximately 150,000 learners in literacy and Mandarin language training. Health education was expanded through school-based programs, with 1,200 health instructors trained; the program received international recognition and support from the United Nations Medical Aid to China and the Joint Commission on Rural Reconstruction.

In 1952, Chen proposed the educational principles of "a revolutionary outlook on life, a strong sense of responsibility, and profound love for education", emphasizing the role of teachers as social guides and calling for reforms in teacher education. Measures introduced during his administration included strengthening Mandarin language training in normal schools, improving admission and training standards for teacher-training institutions, and establishing behavioral and professional standards for teacher candidates. The Department of Education also promoted military training programs in teacher-training schools from 1952 and expanded them to senior high schools, vocational schools, and universities in 1953. In addition, the government introduced programs related to civil defense, anti-communist education, wartime preparedness, and student military training, including the distribution of instructional materials on anti-communist and anti-Soviet themes and the implementation of reserve officer training for graduates of colleges and universities.

== Legacy and assessment ==
The Taiwanese writer Huang Chun-ming once mentioned in an interview that when he was studying at the National Taipei University of Education, Professor Chen Hsueh-ping once came to give a speech. Huang recalled:

What is the essence of education at a teachers' college? It's love! And what is the essence of love in education? It's patience! If a student doesn't understand something after being taught once, then teach it again. If the student still doesn't get it, of course you have to teach it once more—but this time, you must first reflect and ask yourself: 'If I've taught it twice and the student still doesn't understand, what's wrong with my method?' So, the third time, you must improve and try a different approach. Keep revising your teaching until the student truly understands—just imagine how much patience that takes!

— Chen Hsueh-ping

Huang said he remembered Chen because of this speech. Later, after Huang was expelled from school for assaulting a campus security guard, he managed to rush into Chen's office to pour out his troubles. Chen not only listened but also recognized Huang's sincerity and gave him a letter of recommendation, which allowed him to transfer to the Tainan Normal School.

In his diary, Chiang Ching-kuo named Chen Hsueh-ping, along with Kuo Chi (郭驥) and Ho Chung-han (賀衷寒), as key figures in Chen Cheng's inner circle, describing Chen Hsueh-ping as the "most insidious" among those he believed were orchestrating attacks against him.
