= Jiang Yi-huah =

Taiwanese political scientist and politician (born 1960)

- 江宜樺
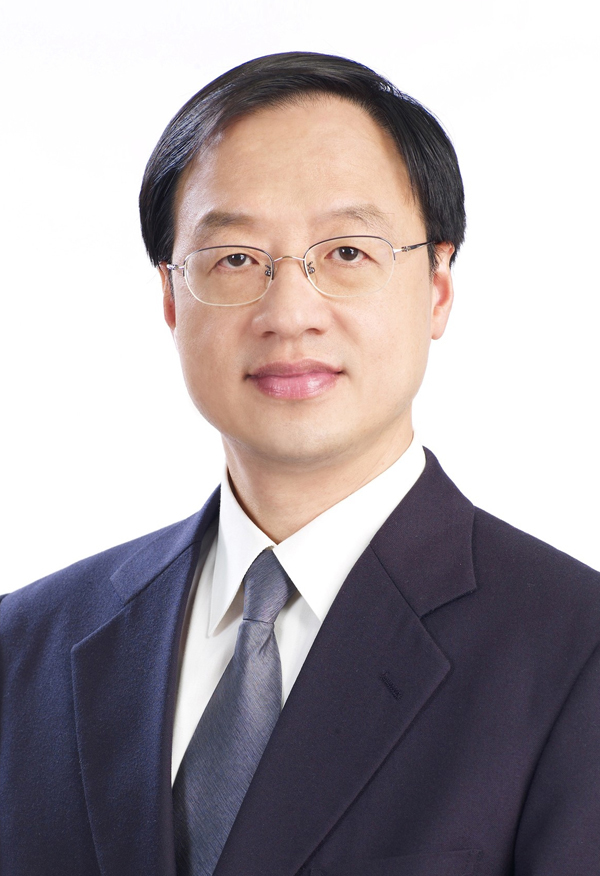
- Official portrait, 2014

25th Premier of the Republic of China
- In office 18 February 2013 – 8 December 2014
- President: Ma Ying-jeou
- Vice Premier: Mao Chi-kuo
- Preceded by: Sean Chen
- Succeeded by: Mao Chi-kuo

Vice Premier of the Republic of China
- In office 6 February 2012 – 18 February 2013
- Premier: Sean Chen
- Preceded by: Sean Chen
- Succeeded by: Mao Chi-kuo

Minister of the Interior
- In office 10 September 2009 – 6 February 2012
- Premier: Wu Den-yih
- Preceded by: Liao Liou-yi
- Succeeded by: Lee Hong-yuan

Minister of Research, Development and Evaluation
- In office 20 May 2008 – 10 September 2009
- Premier: Liu Chao-shiuan
- Deputy: Sung Yu-hsieh; Yeh Kuang-shih
- Preceded by: Jay Shih
- Succeeded by: Sung Yu-hsieh (Acting)

Personal details
- Born: 18 November 1960 (age 65) Nuannuan, Keelung, Taiwan
- Party: Kuomintang
- Education: National Taiwan University (BA, MA); Yale University (PhD)
- Scientific career
- Fields: Political science
- Workplaces: National Taiwan University; National Chung Cheng University; Stanford University
- Thesis: Thinking without a bannister: An interpretation of Hannah Arendt's aesthetic politics (1993)
- Doctoral advisor: Steven Smith; Joseph Hamburger
- Other academic advisors: David R. Mayhew

Jiang Yi-huah (Chinese: 江宜樺; pinyin: Jiāng Yíhuà; born 18 November 1960) is a Taiwanese political scientist and politician who served as the premier of the Republic of China from 2013 to 2014.

After graduating from National Taiwan University, Jiang earned his doctorate from Yale University and became a professor of political science and political philosophy. He served as Minister of the Interior from 2009 to 2012 and Minister of Research, Development and Evaluation Commission of the Executive Yuan from 2008 to 2009. In 2012, he became the Vice Premier of the Republic of China before being appointed as premier under President Ma Ying-jeou.

== Early life and education ==
Jiang was born to a Hakka Chinese family in Keelung in 1960. His father was Mu-Chi Jiang (江木吉) and his mother was Chen-Chin Jiang. Mu-Chi was born in Zhangzhou, Fujian, and moved during the Great Retreat to Taiwan, where he became a police captain.

During junior high school, at age 13, Jiang wrote an essay saying that his dream career was to be the president of the Republic of China once he grew up. He attended Taipei Municipal Chien Kuo High School (CKHS), where he was classmates with Eric Chu, Chen Chung-wei (the son of novelist Chiung Yao), and future president Lai Ching-te. After graduating from CKHS in 1979, he enrolled in National Taiwan University (NTU) and graduated with a bachelor's degree and master's degree in political science in 1983 and 1987, respectively. Jiang wrote his master's thesis, "Politics, Action, and Judgment: A Study of Hannah Arendt's Political Thought" (Chinese: 政治，行動，與判斷──漢娜·鄂蘭政治思想之研究), on the German philosopher Hannah Arendt.

After receiving his master's degree, Jiang began doctoral studies in political science at NTU in 1998. He then was awarded a scholarship by the Fulbright Program and the Earhart Foundation to complete graduate studies in the United States at Yale University, where he earned his Ph.D. in political science in 1993. As a graduate student at Yale, he read the works of Ian Shapiro. His doctoral dissertation, completed under professor Steven B. Smith and historian Joseph Hamburger, was titled, "Thinking Without a Bannister: An Interpretation of Hannah Arendt's Aesthetic Politics".

== Academic career ==
After returning to Taiwan, Jiang worked as an assistant researcher and fellow at the Sun Yat-sen Institute for Humanities and Social Sciences of Academia Sinica. From 1995 to 1999, he worked as an associate professor in the Department of Political Science at National Taiwan University, and was promoted to a full professor in 1999.

In 2000, Jiang was a visiting scholar in England at the University of Cambridge in Darwin College. In 2001, he was a visiting professor at the East Asian Institute of Columbia University. From 2003 to 2005, he served as the vice dean of the College of Social Sciences at National Taiwan University. In July 2005, Jiang served as the executive director of the Shih Ming-teh Chair of Political Science at National Taiwan University.

== Research, Development and Evaluation Commission ==
Jiang entered politics for the first time in 2008 when he was appointed as the Minister of Research, Development and Evaluation Commission of the Executive Yuan on 20 May 2008.

=== Taiwan sex workers decriminalization ===
During a press conference in June 2009, Jiang said that the Human Rights Protection and Promotion Committee of the Executive Yuan has decided to abolish Article 80 of the Social Order Maintenance Act which regulates sexual transaction that can cause detention or fining of the sex workers. However, the final decision will be left to the local governments.

== Interior Ministry ==
On 10 September 2009, Jiang was appointed as Minister of the Interior (MOI). At the age of 49, he was the youngest person to ever hold the office. The handing over ceremony from the outgoing Minister Liao Liou-yi was presided by Premier Wu Den-yih in Taipei.

=== Uyghur activist ban on visiting Taiwan ===
Speaking at Legislative Yuan in October 2009, Jiang, accompanied by Premier Wu Den-yih, said that Uyghur activist Rebiya Kadeer should not be permitted to enter Taiwan because her World Uyghur Congress is closely associated with terrorist group. His remark was supported by the Premier.

=== Electoral system ===
In December 2009, Jiang said that officials from Ministry of the Interior and Ministry of Justice should ensure justice and fairness in administrative electoral process by avoiding stumping on the candidates. In March 2010, Jiang said that Taiwan will have seven kinds of local elections being held all in one day starting in 2014.

=== 1996 Hotline for Interior Affairs ===
MOI officially launched the "1996 Hotline of Interior Affairs" in November 2011 after three months operation trial. Speaking at the press conference, Jiang said that the MOI is in charge of almost everything in people's daily life, ranging from marriage and birth registration, various social welfare and subsidies provider, petition service, corruption reporting, housing transfer registration and emergency reporting. In order to make their service more efficient and more convenient to people, MOI has merged some of their service hotline into one single number.

== Vice Premiership ==
Jiang was appointed to become Vice Premier on 6 February 2012. With this, he had to resign from his professorship at NTU.

=== Immigration policy ===
In July 2012, Jiang said that the Executive Yuan is mulling immigration and population policy in order to attract foreign talents, boost human capital and improve Taiwan's competitiveness. He added that policies from various ministries will be integrated so that this regulation change won't affect much to the current local employment.

== Premiership ==
Jiang was sworn in as the President of the Executive Yuan on 18 February 2013 at the Presidential Office in the ceremony presided over by Vice President Wu Den-yih, thus making him the Premier of the Republic of China. He was the youngest premier since Chen Cheng to take office. After the inauguration, Jiang pledged to push for government reform.

He was succeeded as premier by Mao Chi-kuo on 8 December 2014.

=== Politics ===
==== Detention of Chen Shui-bian ====
In April 2013, responding to the remark from the DPP legislator, Jiang reaffirmed that the detention of former President Chen Shui-bian in Taipei Prison is not politically motivated, but purely because of his corruption crime.

==== Corruption fight ====
In early May 2013, Jiang said that he hates corruption and wishes to have all of his Executive Yuan officials free from such involvement. He asked Justice Minister Tseng Yung-fu to look into any unsuitable officials for their position. He requested not only the heads of government to maintain their own integrity, but also all of the other officials working under them. The move came after several corruption cases involving Cabinet Secretary-General Lin Yi-shih and Kuomintang Taipei City Councilor Lai Su-ju.

== See also ==
- List of premiers of the Republic of China

Political offices
Preceded by Liao Liou-yi	Minister of the Interior; 2009–2012	Succeeded by Lee Hong-yuan
Preceded by Sean Chen	Vice Premier of the Republic of China; 2012–2013	Succeeded by Mao Chi-kuo
Preceded by Sean Chen	Premier of the Republic of China; 2013–2014	Succeeded by Mao Chi-kuo
