= Research, Development and Evaluation Commission =

- 研究發展考核委員會; Yánjiū Fāzhǎn Kǎohé Wěiyuánhuì
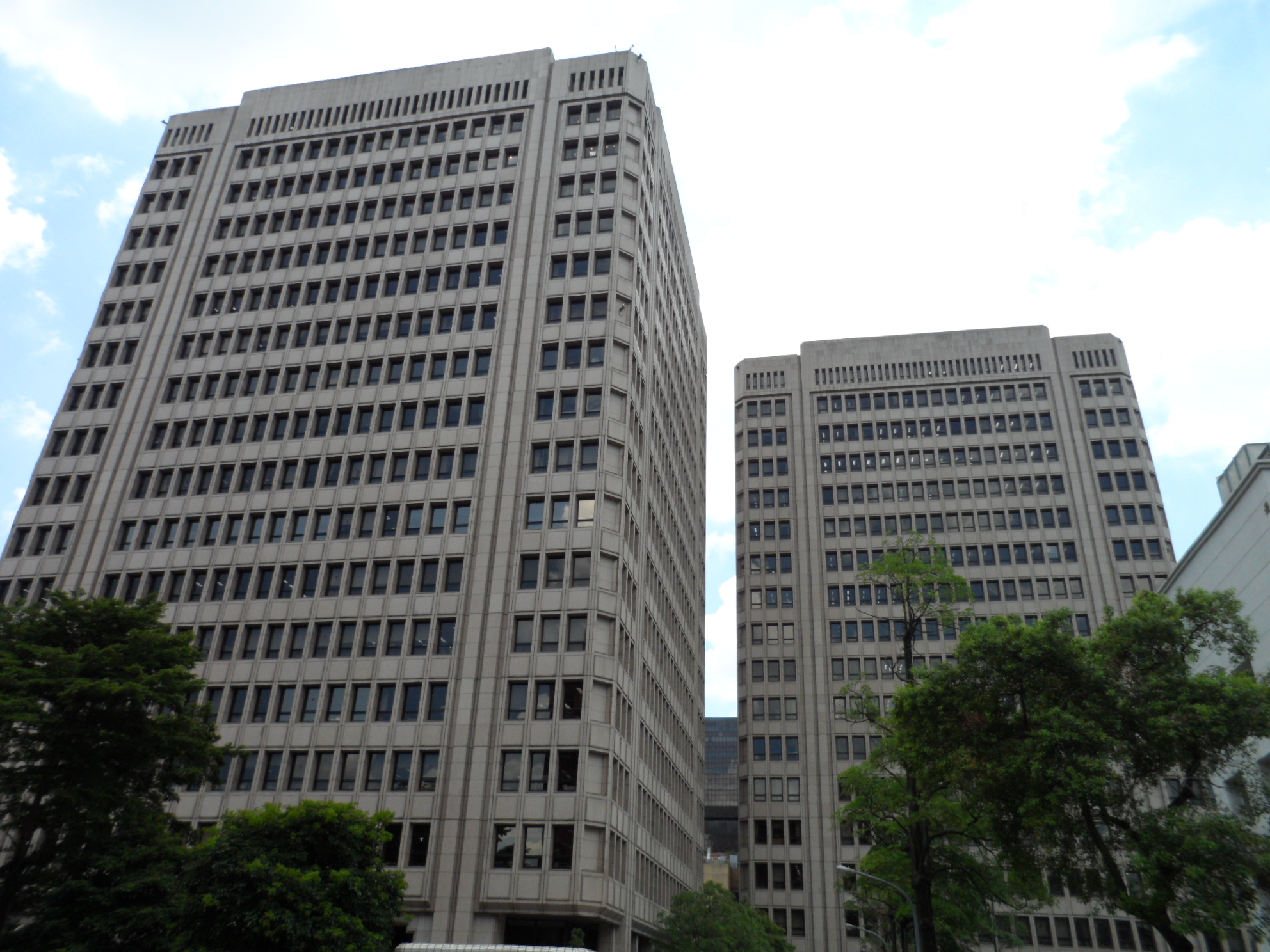

Agency overview
- Formed: 1969
- Dissolved: 21 January 2014
- Superseding agency: National Development Council
- Jurisdiction: Taiwan
- Headquarters: Taipei City
- Website: archive.rdec.gov.tw

The Research, Development and Evaluation Commission (RDEC; Chinese: 研究發展考核委員會; pinyin: Yánjiū Fāzhǎn Kǎohé Wěiyuánhuì) was a branch of the Executive Yuan of Taiwan. The commission was responsible for policy research and development, policy planning, policy supervision and evaluation, government's IT management, circulation of government publications, archives and other tasks assigned by the prime minister.

The agency was dissolved on 21 January 2014 when it was merged with Council for Economic Planning and Development to form the National Development Council.

== Organizational structure ==
- Department of Research and Development
- Department of Planning
- Department of Supervision and Evaluation
- Department of Information Management
- Department of Regional Affairs
- Secretariat
- Personnel Office
- Civil Service Ethics Office
- Accounting Office

== List of ministers ==
Name	Term
Chen Hsueh-ping	March 1969 – June 1972
Yang Chia-lin	June 1972 – June 1976
Kuo Cheng	June 1976 – September 1976
Wei Yung	September 1976 – July 1988
Ma Ying-jeou	July 1988 – June 1991
Sun Te-hsiung	June 1991 – December 1994
Wang Jen-huong	December 1994 – June 1996
Huang Ta-chou	June 1996 – September 1997
Yung Chaur-shin	September 1997 – July 1999
Wea Chi-lin	July 1999 – May 2000
Lin Chia-cheng	May 2000 – May 2004
Yeh Jiunn-rong	June 2004 – April 2006
Jay N. Shih	August 2006 – 19 May 2008
Jiang Yi-huah	20 May 2008 – 10 September 2009
Sung Yu-hsieh (acting)	10 September 2009 – 30 September 2009
Chu Chin-peng	30 September 2009 – 4 July 2012
Sung Yu-hsieh	4 July 2012 – 21 January 2014

== See also ==
- National Development Council (Taiwan)
- Joint Research Centre
