= Kao Shien-quey =

Taiwanese politician

- 高仙桂

Deputy Minister of National Development Council of the Republic of China
- Incumbent
- Assumed office 20 May 2016
- Minister: Chen Tain-jy
- Deputy: Kung Ming-hsin, Tseng Shu-cheng; Chiou Jiunn-rong, Tseng Shu-cheng

Personal details
- Education: National Taiwan University (BA, MA)

Kao Shien-quey (Chinese: 高仙桂; pinyin: Gāo Xiānguì) is a Taiwanese politician. She has served as the Deputy Minister of National Development Council since 20 May 2016.

== Education ==
Kao obtained her bachelor's and master's degree in economics from National Taiwan University.
