= National Development Council (Taiwan) =

Government agency of the Republic of China

- 國家發展委員會; Guójiā Fāzhǎn Wěiyuánhuì (Mandarin); Koet-kâ Fat-chán Vî-yèn-fi (Hakka); Kok-ka Hoat-tián Úi-oân-hōe (Taiwanese Taigi)
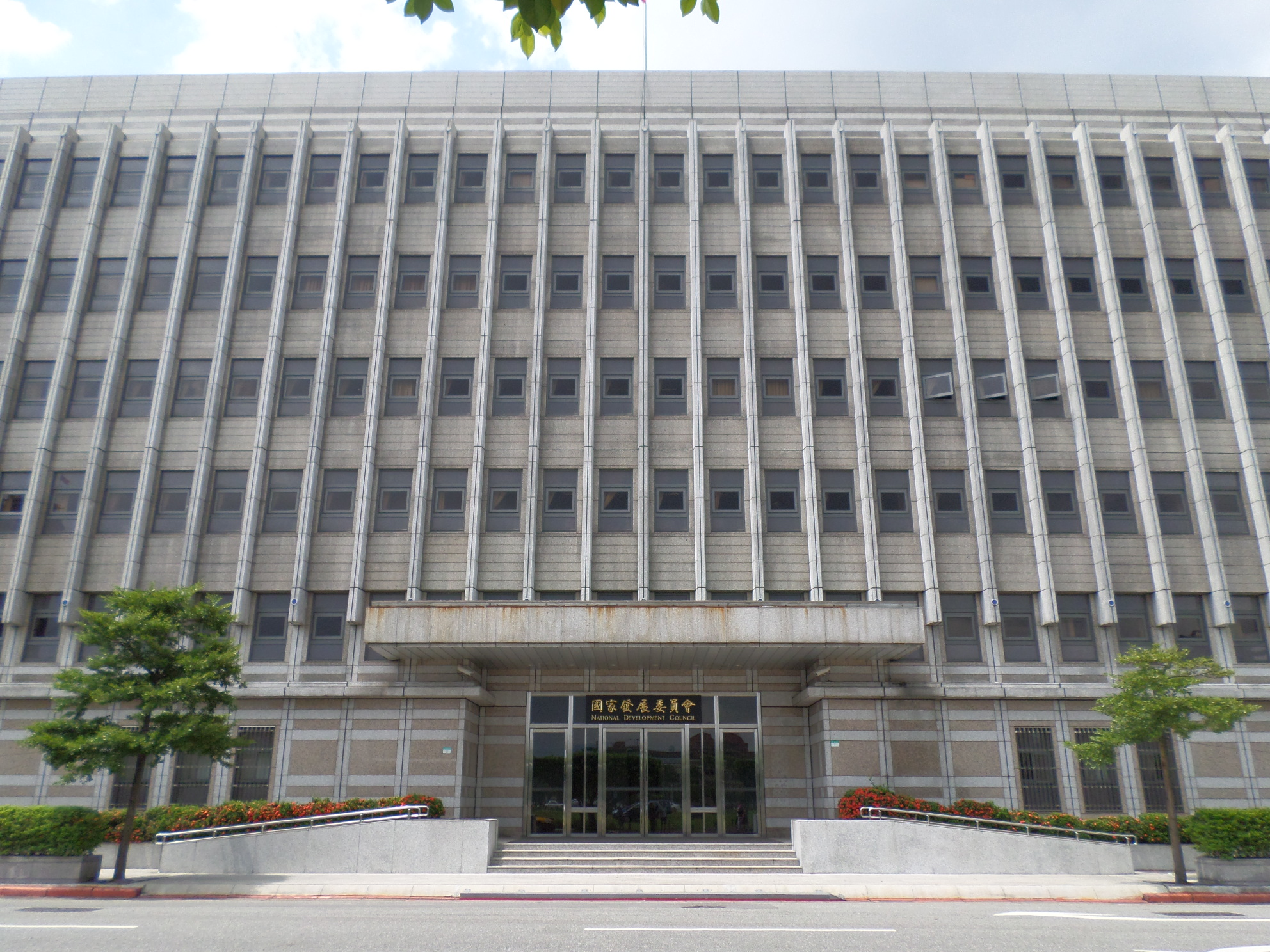

Agency overview
- Formed: 22 January 2014
- Preceding agency: Council for Economic Planning and Development Research, Development and Evaluation Commission
- Headquarters: Zhongzheng, Taipei, Taiwan
- Minister responsible: Paul Liu, Minister
- Deputy Ministers responsible: Kao Shien-quey, Deputy Minister; Li-Pei Peng, Jan Fang-Guan, Deputy Minister
- Parent agency: Executive Yuan
- Website: www.ndc.gov.tw

The National Development Council (NDC; traditional Chinese: 國家發展委員會; simplified Chinese: 国家发展委员会; pinyin: Guójiā Fāzhǎn Wěiyuánhuì; Pe̍h-ōe-jī: Kok-ka Hoat-tián Úi-oân-hōe) is the policy-planning agency of the Executive Yuan of Taiwan.

== History ==
NDC was formed on 22 January 2014 after the merging of Council for Economic Planning and Development, Research, Development and Evaluation Commission, part of the Public Construction Commission and part of the Data Management Processing Center of the Directorate General of Budget, Accounting and Statistics. From July 2018, the NDC took over the duties for its streamlined Taiwan Province after the Executive Yuan dissolved the Taiwan Provincial Government.

== Organizational structure ==
- Department of Overall Planning
- Department of Economic Development
- Department of Social Development
- Department of Industrial Development
- Department of Human Resource Development
- Department of National Spatial Planning and Development
- Department of Supervision and Evaluation
- Department of Information Management
- Regulatory Reform Center
- Secretariat
- Personnel Office
- Civil Service Ethics Office
- Budget, Accounting and Statistics Office

== List of ministers ==
Kuomintang Non-partisan/ unknown

№	Name	Term of office		Days	Party	Premier
1	Kuan Chung-ming (管中閔)	22 January 2014	4 February 2015	378	Kuomintang	Jiang Yi-huah; Mao Chi-kuo
2	Woody Duh (杜紫軍)	4 February 2015	31 January 2016	361	Independent	Mao Chi-kuo
3	Lin Chu-chia (林祖嘉)	1 February 2016	19 May 2016	108	Independent	Chang San-cheng
4	Chen Tain-jy (陳添枝)	20 May 2016	7 September 2017	475		Lin Chuan
5	Chen Mei-ling (陳美伶)	8 September 2017	19 May 2020	984		William Lai; Su Tseng-chang II
6	Kung Ming-hsin (龔明鑫)	20 May 2020	20 May 2024	1461		Su Tseng-chang II; Chen Chien-jen
7	Paul Liu (劉鏡清)	20 May 2024	Incumbent	727		Cho Jung-tai

== Transportation and access ==
The council building is accessible within walking distance West from NTU Hospital Station of the Taipei Metro.

== See also ==
- Executive Yuan
- Council for Economic Planning and Development
- Research, Development and Evaluation Commission
