= 2017 in Taiwan =

- Decades: 1990s; 2000s; 2010s; 2020s
- See also: Other events of 2017; History of Taiwan • Timeline • Years

Events from the year 2017 in Taiwan, Republic of China. This year is numbered Minguo 106 according to the official Republic of China calendar.

== Incumbents ==
- President – Tsai Ing-wen
- Vice President – Chen Chien-jen
- Premier – Lin Chuan, William Lai
- Vice Premier – Lin Hsi-yao, Shih Jun-ji

== Events ==
=== January ===
- 1 January
  - The abolishment of the Special Investigation Division.
  - The increment of monthly minimum wage from NT$20,008 to NT$21,009 and hourly minimum wage from NT$126 to NT$133.
  - The reduction of annual national holidays from 19 to 12 days.
  - The increment of annual leaves from 0 to 3 days, 7 to 10 days, 10 to 14 days and 14 to 15 days for employees who have worked for 6–12 months, 2–3 years, 3–5 years and 5–10 years respectively.
  - Implementation of smoking ban at all bus stops in Taipei.
- 5 January – The opening of Taiwan High Speed Rail Museum in Taoyuan City.
- 6 January – American-born Roman Catholic priest Brendan O'Connell becomes the first foreign-born, naturalized citizen of the Republic of China.
- 7 January – Resignation of Kuomintang Deputy Chairperson Steve Chan.
- 11 January – Liaoning aircraft carrier sailed along the western side of Taiwan Strait median line.
- 17 January – The establishment of Kinmen-Matsu Joint Services Center in Kinmen.

=== February ===
- 2 February – Taoyuan International Airport MRT of Taoyuan Metro began trial runs.
- 8 February – The swearing-in of:
  - Chen Shih-chung as the Minister of Health and Welfare
  - Chen Liang-gee as the Minister of Science and Technology
  - Lin Mei-chu as the Minister of Labor
  - Lin Tsung-hsien as the Minister of Council of Agriculture
- 13 February – Tour bus accident in Nangang District, Taipei killing 33 passengers.

=== March ===
- 2 March
  - The official launch of Taoyuan Airport MRT.
  - The opening of Linkou Station in Linkou District, New Taipei.
  - The opening of Taishan Station in Taishan District, New Taipei.
  - The opening of Xinzhuang Fuduxin Station in Xinzhuang District, New Taipei.
- 10 March – The opening of Presidential branch office in Kaohsiung.
- 12 March – The founding of the People Rich Party by Chang Mu-ting.
- 15–19 March – 2017 World Junior Figure Skating Championships
- 16 March – The establishment of the Anti-Money Laundering Office.
- 18 March – The opening of Presidential branch office in Taichung.

=== April ===
- 21 April – The launch of Taiwan Halal Center at Taipei World Trade Center.

=== May ===
- 10 May – The closure of Fiji Trade and Tourism Representative Office in Taipei.
- 13 May – The opening of Sky Dream, Taiwan's largest Ferries wheel in Houli District, Taichung.
- 15 May – The final print edition of The China Post is published.
- 20 May – 2017 Kuomintang chairmanship election
- 24 May – The Judicial Yuan ruled that laws restricting same-sex marriage were unconstitutional and gave the Legislative Yuan two years to amend existing laws or create new laws so as to comply with the court's decision.

=== June ===
- 6 June – Visit of Palau Health Minister Emais Roberts to Taipei.
- 13 June – Panama switches diplomatic relations from the Republic of China to the People's Republic of China.
- 2–6 June – The June 2017 Taiwan rainstorm caused widespread flooding, landslides and infrastructure damage across Taiwan.

=== July ===
- 1 July – People's Liberation Army (PLA) Liaoning aircraft carrier entered the air defense identification zone (ADIZ) of Taiwan.
- 3 July – The Supreme Court rejects an appeal from convicted rapist and murderer Huang Lin-kai and upholds his death sentence, which is ultimately carried out in January 2025.
- 20 July – Eight PLA Xian H-6K bomber aircraft and one Shaanxi Y-8 aircraft flew near east and west coasts of Taiwan.
- 25 July – One PLA Xian H-6K bomber aircraft flew near Taiwan ADIZ passing through Bashi Channel and the Miyako Strait.
- 29 July – Typhoon Nesat made landfall in Taiwan.

=== August ===
- 1 August – The upgrade of Chungyu Institute of Technology in Xinyi District, Keelung to be Chungyu University of Film and Arts.
- 5 August – A group of PLA Xian H-6K bomber aircraft and one Shaanxi Y-8 aircraft flew near Taiwan ADIZ.
- 9 August – One PLA Shaanxi Y-8 aircraft flew east of Taiwan passing through the Miyako Strait.
- 13 August – Two PLA Shaanxi Y-8 aircraft flew east of Taiwan.
- 15 August
  - Tatan Power Company tripped causing blackout to northern half of Taiwan Island.
  - Economic Affairs Minister Lee Chih-kung tendered his resignation.
- 16 August – Shen Jong-chin appointed acting Minister of Economic Affairs.
- 19 August – Opening ceremony of the 2017 Summer Universiade held at Taipei Municipal Stadium.
- 30 August – Closing ceremony of the 2017 Summer Universiade held at Taipei Municipal Stadium.

=== September ===
- 8 September
  - The appointment of William Lai as the Premier of the Republic of China.
  - The appointment of Shih Jun-ji as the Vice Premier of the Republic of China.
  - The appointment of Shen Jong-chin as the Minister of Economic Affairs.
  - The appointment of Kung Ming-hsin as the Deputy Minister of Economic Affairs.
  - The appointment of Chen Mei-ling as the Minister of National Development Council.
  - The appointment of Chiou Jiunn-rong (邱俊榮) as the Deputy Minister of National Development Council.
  - The appointment of Wellington Koo as the Chairperson of Financial Supervisory Commission.
  - The appointment of Lee Meng-yen as the acting Mayor of Tainan.
  - The appointment of Cho Jung-tai as the Secretary-General of Executive Yuan.
- 15 September – The disestablishment of Mongolian and Tibetan Affairs Commission.
- 26 September – The opening of Circular Line Phase I of Kaohsiung MRT.

=== October ===
- 2–8 October – 2017 OEC Kaohsiung
- 15 October – The opening of Jinlun Bridge in Taimali Township, Taitung County.

=== November ===
- 10 November – The passage of the Political Party Act by the Legislative Yuan.
- 27 November – The opening of Japanese Cultural Center in Songshan District, Taipei.
- 28 November – The appointment of Su Li-chiung as the Deputy Minister of Labor, replacing Liau Huei-fang.

=== December ===
- 5 December – The passage of the Act on Promoting Transitional Justice by the Legislative Yuan.
- 23 December – The opening of Baolai Spring Park in Liouguei District, Kaohsiung.

== Deaths ==
- 8 January – Chin Chin-sheng, 69, Taiwanese politician, Secretary-General of People First Party, heart attack.
- 22 January – Chen Yu-mei, 50, Taiwanese politician, deputy minister of the OCAC (2013–14).
- 23 January – Leslie Koo, 62, Taiwanese business executive (Taiwan Cement), fall.
- 24 January – Mike Hua, 92, Taiwanese aeronautical engineer (AIDC F-CK-1 Ching-kuo).
- 9 February – Chen Hsing-ling, 92, Taiwanese military officer.
- 16 February – Wang Ben-hu, 63, Taiwanese television presenter, complications of bone marrow and intestinal cancer.
- 8 March – Li Yuan-tsu, 93, Taiwanese politician, Vice President of the Republic of China (1990–1996), kidney failure.
- 11 March – Tsui Hsiao-ping, 94, Taiwanese radio director.
- 26 March – Chen Uen, 58, Taiwanese manhua artist, heart attack.
- 8 April – Pei Pu-yen, 96, Taiwanese literary scholar, brain tumor.
- 18 April – Li Yih-yuan, 85, Taiwanese anthropologist, complications of pneumonia.
- 20 April – Chen Lien-hua (陳蓮花), 93, Taiwanese comfort woman, intestinal infection.
- 22 April – Lee Chi-chun, 74, Taiwanese radio presenter.
- 25 April – Hsieh Chin-ting, 81, Taiwanese politician, Miaoli County Magistrate (1981–1989).
- 27 April – Lin Yi-han, 26, Taiwanese writer, suicide by hanging.
- 15 May – Chu Ke-liang, 70, Taiwanese actor (The New Legend of Shaolin, David Loman, The Wonderful Wedding) and comedian, liver failure.
- 31 May – Jerry Martinson, 74, American-born Taiwanese Jesuit priest, heart attack.
- 10 June – Chi Po-lin, 52, Taiwanese film director (Beyond Beauty: Taiwan from Above), helicopter crash.
- 18 June – Shih Chun-jen, 93, Taiwanese neurosurgeon, Minister of the Department of Health (1986–1990), heart attack.
- 21 June – Chen Li-hung, 52, Taiwanese political commentator, brain tumor.
- Jeffrey Ying (應天華), 63, Taiwanese aviator, first Taiwanese pilot to circumnavigate the globe in a single-engine airplane, plane crash.
- 18 July – Robert Wu, 66, Taiwanese businessman, (Eslite Bookstore).
- 22 July – Daniel Ross, 83, American-born Taiwanese Jesuit priest.
- 31 July – Liu Wen-hsiung, 62, Taiwanese politician, MLY (1999–2008).
- 22 August – Matthew Kia Yen-wen, 92, Taiwanese Roman Catholic prelate, Archbishop of Taipei (1978–1989), Bishop of Kiayi (1970–1974) and Hwalien (1974–1978).
- 22 September – Lee Yung-ping, 70, Sarawak-born Taiwanese novelist, multiple organ failure.
- 27 September – Shen Che-tsai, 91, Taiwanese painter.
- 28 September – Lee Hsin, 64, Taiwanese politician, member of the National Assembly (1996–1998) and the Taipei City Council (since 1998), suicide by jumping.
- 4 November – Cheng Ch'ing-wen, 85, Taiwanese writer.
- 16 November – Hsiao Teng-tzang, 83, Taiwanese politician, MLY (1973–1986), Minister of Justice (1988–1989).
- 19 November – Tai Chen-yao, 69, Taiwanese politician, MLY (1990–1996, 1999–2002), pancreatic cancer.
- 9 December – Ching Li, 72, Taiwanese actress.
- 14 December – Yu Kwang-chung, 89, Taiwanese poet.
- 22 December – Wang Panyuan, 109, Taiwanese painter, multiple organ failure.
