= 2014 in Taiwan =

- Decades: 1990s; 2000s; 2010s; 2020s
- See also: Other events of 2014: History of Taiwan; Timeline; Years

Events from the year 2014 in Taiwan, Republic of China. This year is numbered Minguo 103 according to the official Republic of China calendar.

== Incumbents ==
- President – Ma Ying-jeou
- Vice President – Wu Den-yih
- Premier – Jiang Yi-huah, Mao Chi-kuo
- Vice Premier – Mao Chi-kuo, Chang San-cheng

== Events ==
=== January ===
- 20 January – The establishment of V Air.
- 22 January – The National Development Council was established by the merger of Council for Economic Planning and Development and Research, Development and Evaluation Commission.
- 25 January – 2014 ROC Presidential Office Building Truck Attack.
- 26 January – The National Museum of Marine Science and Technology was opened in Keelung City.

=== February ===
- 3 February – The Ministry of Science and Technology was established as an upgrade from the National Science Council.
- 4 February – The reclassification of Fuxing, Heping, Maolin, Namasia, Taoyuan and Wulai from District to Special Municipal Mountain Indigenous District.
- 17 February – The Ministry of Labor was established as an upgrade from the Council of Labor Affairs.
- 28 February – 67th anniversary of the February 28 Incident.

=== March ===
- 18 March – Sunflower Student Movement.

=== April ===
- 14 April – The Kaohsiung Exhibition Center opened in Cianjhen District, Kaohsiung City.
- 19 April – Sean Lien elected to be KMT candidate for Mayor of Taipei election.
- 23 April – The opening of Wind Lion Plaza in Jinhu Township, Kinmen.
- 27 April – The construction of Lungmen Nuclear Power Plant in Gongliao District, New Taipei City is halted.
- 30 April – Eric Chu, Hau Lung-pin and Jason Hu appointed as Vice Chairmen of Kuomintang.

=== May ===
- 21 May – A mass stabbing occurred on the Taipei Metro Blue Line, killing four and injuring 24 people.
- 27 May – Broad One China Framework (Chinese: 大一中原則; pinyin: Dà Yī Zhōng Yuánzé) proposed by seven politicians and academics led by former Democratic Progressive Party Chairman Shih Ming-teh.
- 28 May – Tsai Ing-wen became the Chairperson of Democratic Progressive Party for the second time.
- 30 May – Taoyuan County Deputy Magistrate Ye Shi-wen was removed from his position due to the alleged bribery involving Farglory Land Development Co.

=== June ===
- 3 June – The upgrade of Luzhu Township in Taoyuan County to a county-administered city.
- 4 June – Wu Den-yih appointed as First Vice Chairman of Kuomintang, replacing Secretary-General Tseng Yung-chuan.
- 7 June – The start of 2014 Intercity Football League.
- 12–15 June – 2014 Asian Junior Athletics Championships in Taipei Municipal Stadium, Taipei City.
- 14 June
  - The reopening of Hayashi Department Store in West Central District, Tainan City.
  - The inauguration of Linhousilin Forest Park in Chaozhou Township, Pingtung County.
- 18 June – The official opening of the new Ministry of Health and Welfare building in Nangang District, Taipei from the former building in Datong District, Taipei.
- 25 June – Director of Taiwan Affairs Office Zhang Zhijun visited Taiwan and met with Minister of Mainland Affairs Council Wang Yu-chi, the highest level government of the People's Republic of China to ever visited Taiwan.
- 26 June – Hla'alua and Kanakanavu tribes were recognized as the 15th and 16th tribes of Taiwanese aborigines.
- 27 June – The closure of Quebec Office in Taipei.
- 28 June – 25th Golden Melody Awards at Taipei Arena in Songshan District, Taipei City.
- 30 June – Handover of Dadan Island and Erdan Island from ROC military to Kinmen County Government.

=== July ===
- 1 July – The appointment of Liu Ching-chung as the acting Minister Hakka Affairs Council, replacing Huang Yu-cheng after his resignation to have more time for his family.
- 7–11 July – The visit of Fujian Communist Party Chief You Quan to Taiwan for a 5-day visit.
- 14 July – The appointment of Chen Der-hwa as the acting Minister of Education, replacing Chiang Wei-ling after his resignation over an alleged academic fraud.
- 14–20 July – 2014 OEC Kaohsiung
- 15 July – The appointment of Andrew Kao as the Deputy Minister of Foreign Affairs.
- 15–20 July – 2014 Chinese Taipei Open Grand Prix Gold in Taipei Arena, Taipei.
- 16–27 July – 2014 Asian Junior Women's Volleyball Championship in Taipei.
- 23 July
  - Typhoon Matmo struck Taiwan.
  - TransAsia Airways Flight 222 crash landed in Huxi Township, Penghu County.
- 24 July – The appointment of Hao Feng-ming as the acting Minister of Labor, replacing Pan Shih-wei after his resignation over extramarital affair.
- 28 July – The establishment of Taiwan Film Institute in Zhongzheng District, Taipei.
- 31 July – Multiple explosions hit Kaohsiung after gas leaks.

=== August ===
- 1 August
  - The election of Chang Po-ya and Sun Ta-chuan to become the President and Vice President of Control Yuan replacing Wang Chien-shien and Chen Jinn-lih respectively.
  - The establishment of National Pingtung University in Pingtung County by merging National Pingtung University of Education and National Pingtung Institute of Commerce.
- 7 August – Minister of Economic Affairs Chang Chia-juch tendered his resignation from his ministerial post, but was asked by Premier Jiang Yi-huah to stay.
- 9–17 August – 2014 William Jones Cup.
- 10 August
  - Executive Yuan approved Chang Chia-juch's resignation and appointed Woody Duh as Minister of Economic Affairs.
  - The establishment of Trees Party.
- 15 August – An explosion in Xindian District of Taipei City which led to two deaths and 14 injuries.
- 16 August
  - The appointment of Lin Chu-chia as the Special Deputy Minister of Mainland Affairs Council, replacing Chang Hsien-yao after his resignation due to family reason.
  - The appointment of Shih Hui-fen as the Deputy Minister of Mainland Affairs Council, replacing Lin Chu-chia after his promotion to Special Deputy Minister.
- 20 August – The appointment of Chen Hsiung-wen as the Minister of Labor.
- 21 August – The approval of 2015 Taiwanese federal budget by the Executive Yuan.

=== September ===
- 4 September – The start of the first case of 2014 Taiwan food scandal involving Chang Guann Co.
- 6 September – The establishment of Cross-Strait Taiwanese Business People Chinese Nationalist Party Fan Club in Taipei.
- 14 September – 20th National Congress of Kuomintang in Chiayi City.
- 15 September
  - 37.6 °C of temperature recorded in Kaohsiung, the highest ever since record keeping in 1932.
  - The percentage of Taiwan electricity operating reserves fell to 3.44% of the peak load at 1:44 p.m., the lowest level in 2014.
- 19 September – The first 7-Eleven store opened in Orchid Island.
- 21 September – The landfall of Tropical Storm Fung-wong.
- 26 September – The first flight of Tigerair Taiwan, flying from Taiwan to Singapore.
- 27 September – The opening of Gaomei Lighthouse in Qingshui District, Taichung City.

=== October ===
- 3 October – The appointment of Lin Tzou-yien as the acting Minister of Health and Welfare, replacing Chiu Wen-ta after his resignation due to the tainted lard oil scandal.
- 9 October – The start of the second case of 2014 Taiwan food scandal involving Ting Hsin International Group.
- 10 October – The Ocean Researcher V sinks off Penghu.
- 17 October – The appointment of Chiang Been-huang as the Minister of Health and Welfare.
- 21 October – An AIDC AT-3 crashes in Ziguan District, Kaohsiung, killing the pilot, Chuang Pei-yuan.
- 22 October
  - The swearing in of Chiang Been-huang as the Minister of Health and Welfare.
  - The establishment of Food Safety Office of the Executive Yuan as an upgrade from the former Food Safety Promotion Task Force.
- 25 October – The opening of Hakka Round House in Houlong Township, Miaoli County.
- 29 October – The announcement by Interior Minister Chen Wei-zen of banning to study in Mainland China for senior civil servants and officials whose work is related to national security starting 30 October 2014.
- 31 October – The inauguration of Starlight Bridge in New Taipei.

=== November ===
- 1 November
  - A factory explosion in Changhua County injuring six people.
  - Monument to commemorate the Cepo' Incident (Chinese: 大港口事件) opened at Jingpu Elementary School in Fengbin Township, Hualien County.
- 4 November – Car attack on the official residence of President Ma Ying-jeou in Taipei.
- 8 November – The funeral ceremony of the crashed AIDC AT-3 pilot Chuang Pei-yuan at Republic of China Air Force Academy.
- 15 November
  - The new Songshan-Xindian Line of Taipei Metro began its services.
  - The renaming of Nanjing East Road Station to Nanjing Fuxing Station.
- 16 November – The opening of Yilan Museum of Art in Yilan City, Yilan County.
- 20 November – The reopening of Sanduo, Kaisyuan and Yishin Roads in Kaohsiung after being damaged by the multiple gas explosions on 31 July.
- 23 November
  - The 120th founding anniversary celebration of Kuomintang in Taichung.
  - The opening of National Taichung Theater in Taichung.
- 25 November – The 5-day visit of Marshall Islands President Christopher Loeak to Taiwan.
- 29 November
  - The 2014 Republic of China local and municipal election.
    - Ko Wen-je (Independent) elected as Mayor of Taipei City.
    - Incumbent Eric Chu (KMT) reelected as Mayor of New Taipei City.
    - Cheng Wen-tsan (DPP) elected as Mayor of Taoyuan City.
    - Lin Chia-lung (DPP) elected as Mayor of Taichung City.
    - Incumbent William Lai (DPP) reelected as Mayor of Tainan City.
    - Incumbent Chen Chu (DPP) reelected as Mayor of Kaohsiung City.
    - Lin Yu-chang (DPP) elected as Mayor of Keelung City.
    - Lin Chih-chien (DPP) elected as Mayor of Hsinchu City.
    - Twu Shiing-jer (DPP) elected as Mayor of Chiayi City.
    - Incumbent Lin Tsung-hsien (DPP) reelected as Magistrate of Yilan County.
    - Incumbent Chiu Ching-chun (KMT) reelected as Magistrate of Hsinchu County.
    - Hsu Yao-chang (KMT) elected as Magistrate of Miaoli County.
    - Wei Ming-ku (DPP) elected as Magistrate of Changhua County.
    - Lin Ming-chen (KMT) elected as Magistrate of Nantou County.
    - Lee Chin-yung (DPP) elected as Magistrate of Yunlin County.
    - Incumbent Helen Chang (DPP) reelected as Magistrate of Chiayi County.
    - Incumbent Justin Huang (KMT) reelected as Magistrate of Taitung County.
    - Pan Meng-an (DPP) elected as Magistrate of Pingtung County.
    - Incumbent Fu Kun-chi (Independent) reelected as Magistrate of Hualien County.
    - Chen Kuang-fu (DPP) elected as Magistrate of Penghu County.
    - Chen Fu-hai (Independent) elected as Magistrate of Kinmen County.
    - Liu Cheng-ying (KMT) elected as Magistrate of Lienchiang County.
  - Resignation of Jiang Yi-huah from Premier of the Republic of China.
- 30 November
  - Resignation of Hau Lung-pin from Vice Chairman of Kuomintang.
  - Resignation of Woody Duh from Minister of Economic Affairs.

=== December ===
- 1 December
  - Resignation of Wu Den-yih as First Vice Chairman of Kuomintang.
  - Resignation of Lung Ying-tai from Minister of Culture.
  - Fire broke out at Alishan National Scenic Area in Chiayi County spreading over more than 5 hectares of land.
  - The six-day visit of Nauru President Baron Waqa to Taiwan.
- 2 December – A man from Hong Kong became the 9,000,000th international visitor to Taiwan in 2014.
- 3 December
  - Resignation of Ma Ying-jeou as Chairman of Kuomintang.
  - Appointment of Wu Den-yih as acting Chairman of Kuomintang.
  - Appointment of Mao Chi-kuo as the Premier of the Republic of China.
  - First batch of 60 Sikorsky UH-60 Black Hawk helicopter package purchased from the United States arrived in Kaohsiung.
  - Garuda Indonesia announces the closure of its Taiwan office.
- 5 December – The appointment of Chang San-cheng as the designated Vice Premier of the Republic of China.
- 6 December – The 18th Taipei Culture Award.
- 8 December
  - The opening of National Taitung University Library and Information Center in Taitung City, Taitung County.
  - The swearing-in of the new cabinet under Premier Mao Chi-kuo.
- 9 December – The 8-day visit of ARATS President Chen Deming to Taiwan.
- 10 December
  - Ministry of the Interior announced that Mainland Chinese tourists can apply for Exit and Entry Permit upon arrival for visits to Kinmen, Penghu and Lienchiang Counties.
  - The 35th anniversary commemoration of Kaohsiung Incident in Taipei.
  - Two reactors of Jinshan Nuclear Power Plant in New Taipei City underwent maintenance.
- 14 December – The launch of the second phase of 40 kWp photovoltaic power generation in Taiping Island, Kaohsiung.
- 15–16 December – Cross-Strait CEO Summit in Taipei.
- 16 December – The opening of Taipei Children's Amusement Park in Taipei.
- 25 December – The upgrade of Taoyuan from county to special municipality.
- 27 December – The inauguration of the Ministry of National Defense new building complex in Dazhi area of Taipei.

== Deaths ==
- 2 January – Li Tai-hsiang, 72, Taiwanese Amis composer and songwriter.
- 11 January – Chai Trong-rong, 78, Taiwanese politician, MLY (1993–1996, 1997–2012).
- 17 February – Frankie Kao, 63, Taiwanese singer.
- 13 March – Wang King-ho, 97, Taiwanese physician.
- 1 May – Chou Meng-tieh, 92, Taiwanese poet and writer.
- 26 May – Yu Chen Yueh-ying, 87, Taiwanese politician, Kaohsiung County Magistrate (1985–1993), MLY (1984–1985).
- 1 June – Chang Feng-hsu, 85, Taiwanese politician, Pingtung County Magistrate (1964–73), Mayor of Taipei (1972–76), Minister of the Interior (1976–78).
- 23 July – Yeh Ken-chuang, 82, Taiwanese carpenter, plane crash.
- 15 August – Chen Kuei-miao, 81, Taiwanese politician, MLY (1990–1998), co-founder of the New Party.
- 2 September – Su Nan-cheng, 78, Taiwanese politician, Mayor of Tainan (1977–1985), Mayor of Kaohsiung (1985–1990).
- 24 September – Tsou Yu-mei, 57, Taiwanese politician, Mayor of Miaoli City (2006–2010).
- 5 October – Tsai Wan-tsai, 85, Taiwanese financier (Fubon Group).
- 6 October – Chen Chi-lu, 91, Taiwanese politician, Minister of the Council for Cultural Affairs (1981–1988).
- 27 November – Wang Yung-tsai, 93, Taiwanese industrialist (Formosa Plastics).
