= Wang An-pang =

Taiwanese politician (born 1976)

- 王安邦
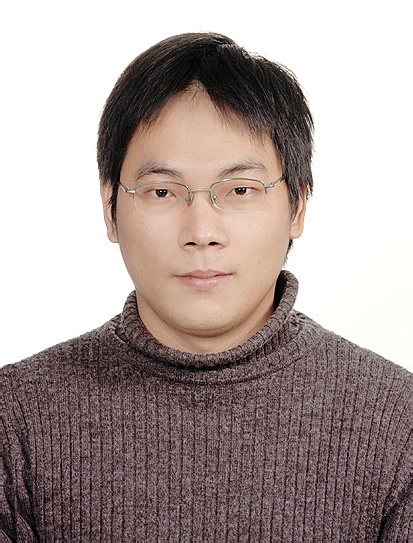

Deputy Minister of Labor
- Incumbent
- Assumed office 20 May 2020
- Minister: Hsu Ming-chun; Ho Pei-shan

Personal details
- Born: 15 August 1976 (age 49) Taiwan
- Party: Democratic Progressive Party
- Education: Soochow University (BA); National Taiwan Normal University (MA)

Wang An-pang (Chinese: 王安邦; born 15 August 1976) is a Taiwanese politician.

== Education ==
Wang earned a bachelor's degree in political science from Soochow University and earned a master's degree in the same subject from National Taiwan Normal University.

== Career ==
Wang worked for the Taoyuan City Government during the mayoralty of Cheng Wen-tsan. He served as deputy labor minister in the Tsai Ing-wen presidential administration. In this role, Wang frequently commented on initiatives and policies affecting migrant workers, including negotiations with the Indonesian government on employment fees, revisions to self-isolation guidelines during a 2021 outbreak of COVID-19, and the opening of a Taoyuan-based service center for migrant workers in 2022. Wang participated in negotiations between EVA Airways and the Taoyuan Union of Pilots, which avoided a strike during the Lunar New Year holiday of 2024. In May of that year, Wang retained his post when William Lai assumed the presidency. In July, Wang announced that the Lai administration would reduce restrictions on the hiring of foreign caretakers.
