= Yang Fang-wan =

Taiwanese lawyer and politician

- 楊芳婉
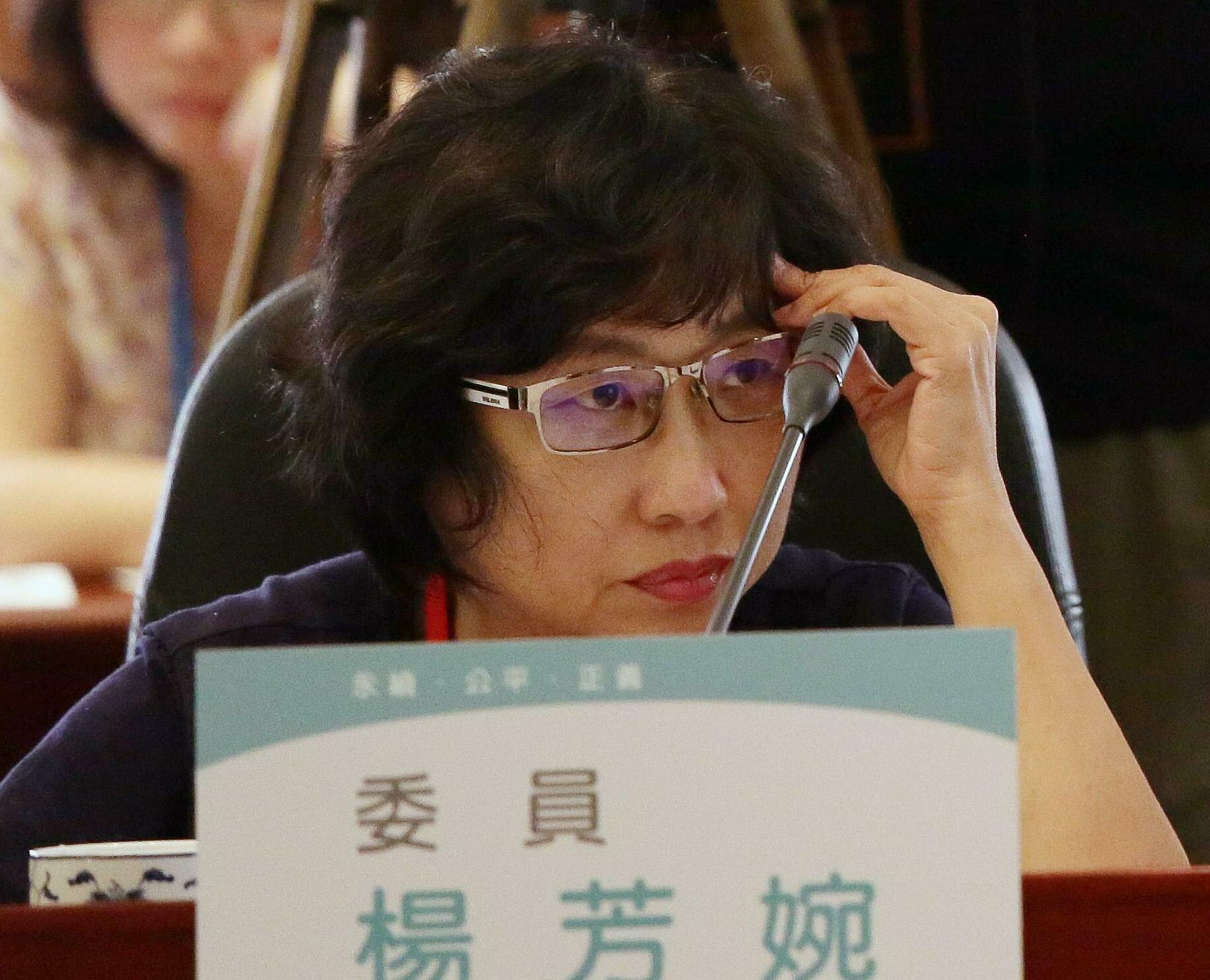
- Yang in 2016

Member of the Control Yuan
- Incumbent
- Assumed office 16 January 2018

Member of the Legislative Yuan
- In office 24 May 2007 – 31 January 2008
- Preceded by: Lu Tien-ling

Personal details
- Born: 1956 (age 69–70)
- Party: Democratic Progressive Party
- Education: National Taiwan University (LLB); University of Texas at Austin (MS)

Yang Fang-wan (Chinese: 楊芳; pinyin: Yáng Fāngwǎn; born 1956) is a Taiwanese lawyer and politician.

She is active in the women's rights movement has worked with the Awakening Foundation. Yang later served on the Commission on Women's Rights Promotion. In 2007, Yang represented Wu Shu-jen in a corruption case brought against Wu's husband Chen Shui-bian. She assumed a seat on the Legislative Yuan on 24 May 2007, shortly after Lu Tien-ling took office as head of the Council of Labor Affairs. The Awakening Foundation commended Yang for her support of women's rights during her legislative tenure and recommended that Yang be placed on the Democratic Progressive Party list for an at-large seat in 2008. However, Yang was not reelected via proportional representation. In March 2017, Yang was nominated for a position on the Control Yuan. She was confirmed as a member of the Control Yuan in January 2018.
