= Wu Ming-hung =

- 吳明鴻
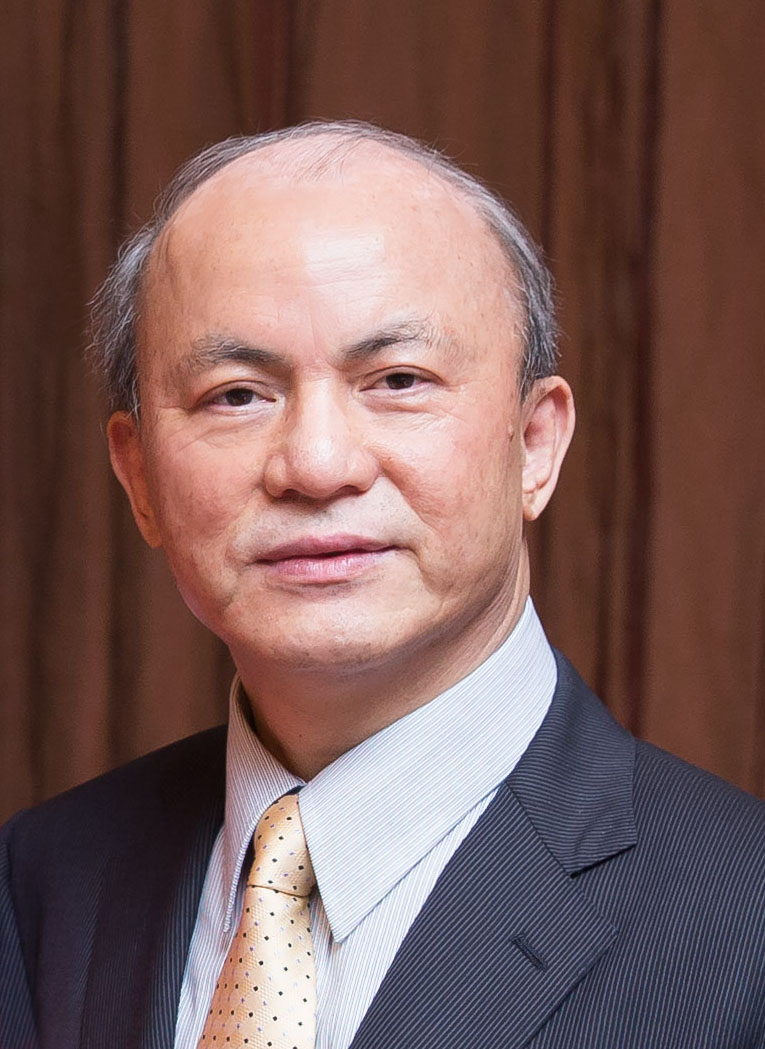
- Official portrait, 2020

President of the Supreme Administrative Court
- In office 31 December 2020 – 25 October 2023
- President: Tsai Ing-wen
- Preceded by: Lan Hsien-lin
- Succeeded by: Wu Tung-du

Chief Justice of the 3rd Panel
- In office 2 July 2018 – 31 December 2020
- SAC President: Lan Hsien-lin
- Succeeded by: Hu Fang-hsin

Personal details
- Born: 1953 (age 72–73) Taiwan
- Party: Independent
- Spouse: Lin Mei-chu
- Relatives: Tsai Ing-wen (cousin-in-law)
- Education: National Chengchi University (LLB, LLM)
- Occupation: Judge

Wu Ming-hung (Chinese: 吳明鴻, born 1953) is a Taiwanese judge and prosecutor. He serves as President of the Supreme Administrative Court of Taiwan from 2020 to 2023.

His wife, Lin Mei-chu, had taken several political positions in the executive yuan including minister without portfolio of the executive yuan, minister of labor, etc. between 2017 and 2018. She is also the older cousin of the incumbent President of Taiwan, Tsai Ing-wen.
