= Shih Keh-her =

Politician of Taiwan

- 施克和

Deputy Minister of Labor of the Republic of China
- Incumbent
- Assumed office October 2017 Serving with Su Li-chiung
- Minister: Lin Mei-chu; Hsu Ming-chun
- Vice: Lin San-quei
- Preceded by: Kuo Kuo-wen

Personal details
- Education: National Taiwan University (BA); London School of Economics (MSc); Imperial College London (MBA)

Shih Keh-her (Chinese: 施克和; pinyin: Shī Kèhé) is a Taiwanese politician. He is currently the Deputy Minister of Labor since October 2017.

== Education ==
Shih graduated from National Taiwan University with a bachelor's degree in political science. He then completed graduate studies in England, earning a Master of Science (M.Sc.) in regional and urban planning from the London School of Economics and a Master of Business Administration (M.B.A.) from Imperial College London.
