= Liau Huei-fang =

Taiwanese lawyer and sociologist

- 廖蕙芳

Deputy Minister of Labor of the Republic of China
- In office 20 May 2016 – 27 November 2017
- Minister: Kuo Fang-yu; Lin Mei-chu
- Succeeded by: Su Li-chiung

Personal details
- Education: National Chengchi University (LLB, LLM); Tunghai University (PhD)

Liau Huei-fang (Chinese: 廖蕙芳; pinyin: Liào Huìfāng) is a Taiwanese lawyer and sociologist. She was the Deputy Minister of Labor from 20 May 2016 until 27 November 2017.

== Education ==
Liau attended law school at National Chengchi University, where she graduated with a bachelor's degree in law and a master's degree in law. She then earned her Ph.D. in social studies from Tunghai University.

== Early career ==
Liau had worked as a lawyer, as well as a member of the Committee on Gender Equality in Employment of Council of Labor Affairs, a member of the Committee of the Labor Pension Funds, a member of the Sexual Harassment Prevention Committee of Taipei City Government, vice chairperson and chairperson of the Taiwan Labor Front and member of the Committee on Gender Equality in Employment of Minister of Labor.

== Ministry of Labor ==
=== Minister appointment ===
Liau was appointed as the Deputy Minister of Labor by Premier Lin Chuan on 28 April 2016 and took office on 20 May in the same year.

=== Minister resignation ===
Liau first tendered her resignation to Minister Lin Mei-chu from the deputy minister position on 13 November 2017 and again on 19 November 2017 citing career issues. On 27 November 2017, her resignation was approved by President Tsai Ing-wen and she was replaced by Su Li-chiung.
