= Su Li-chiung =

Taiwanese sociologist

- 蘇麗瓊

Deputy Minister of Health and Welfare of the Republic of China
- In office January 2019 – 2020 Serving with Ho Chi-kung
- Minister: Chen Shih-chung
- Vice: Hsueh Jui-yuan
- Preceded by: Lu Pau-ching

Deputy Minister of Labor of the Republic of China
- In office 28 November 2017 – 29 August 2018 Serving with Shih Keh-her
- Minister: Lin Mei-chu; Hsu Ming-chun
- Vice: Lin San-quei
- Preceded by: Liau Huei-fang

Personal details
- Education: National Chengchi University (BA, MA); Tunghai University (PhD)

Su Li-chiung (Chinese: 蘇麗瓊; pinyin: Sū Lìqióng) is a Taiwanese sociologist. She served as Deputy Minister of Labor from 28 November 2017 to 29 August 2018.

== Education ==
Su graduated from National Chengchi University with a bachelor's degree in sociology, then earned a master's degree in sociology and her Ph.D. in social work in 2012 from Tunghai University. Her doctoral dissertation was titled, "An exploratory study on the life course and old age preparation of single unmarried elderly women".

== Political career ==
Su was the secretary-general of Taipei City Government, and served as the CEO of the organizing committees of 2017 Summer Universiade. Su was appointed deputy minister of labor on 28 November 2017 after the resignation of her predecessor Liau Huei-fang was approved by President Tsai Ing-wen a day before. She resigned the position on 29 August 2018. Su was later appointed deputy director of the Social and Family Affairs Administration and deputy minister of health and welfare. Su was nominated to the Control Yuan in June 2020.
