= Hung Sun-han =

Taiwanese politician (born 1984)

- 洪申翰
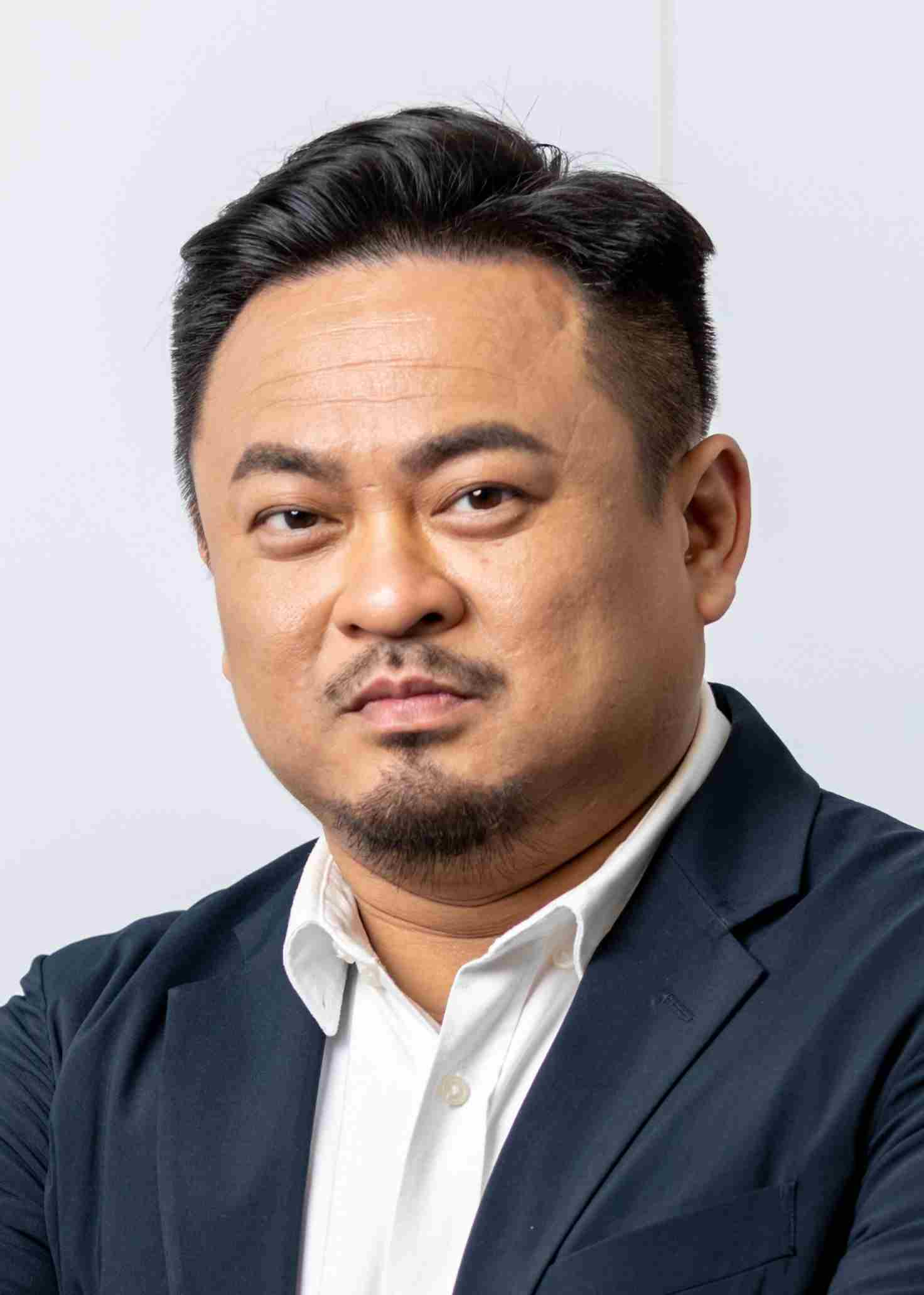
- Official portrait, 2021

7th Minister of Labor
- Incumbent
- Assumed office 25 November 2024
- Prime Minister: Cho Jung-tai
- Preceded by: Chen Ming-jen (acting)

Member of the Legislative Yuan
- In office 1 February 2020 – 24 November 2024
- Succeeded by: Wang Yi-chuan
- Constituency: Party-list (Democratic Progressive)

Personal details
- Born: 18 October 1984 (age 42) Taipei, Taiwan
- Party: Democratic Progressive Party
- Education: National Taiwan University

Hung Sun-han (Chinese: 洪申翰; born 16 October 1984) is a Taiwanese politician.

== Early life and education ==
Hung was born on 18 October 1984. He is an only child; he originally lived in Taichung before his family moved to Taipei. He was schooled at Minquan Elementary School in Taipei.

Hung graduated from Taipei Municipal Chien Kuo High School. He was then admitted to National Taiwan University, where he studied atmospheric sciences. As an undergraduate, Hung began experiencing health issues in his second year of university, and underwent eye surgery in his third year. His condition fluctuated after the operation, and he suspended and resumed his studies several times. After two years of suspension, he completed enough coursework to qualify for an equivalent academic credential, but did not complete his degree.

== Political career ==
Hung was the deputy secretary-general of the Green Citizens' Action Alliance, and served on two Executive Yuan committees before election to the Legislative Yuan in 2020 and 2024 via the Democratic Progressive Party list.

On 22 November 2024, Hung was appointed labor minister, following the resignation of Ho Pei-shan. He assumed office on 25 November.
