= Wang Ju-hsuan =

Taiwanese lawyer and politician

- 王如玄
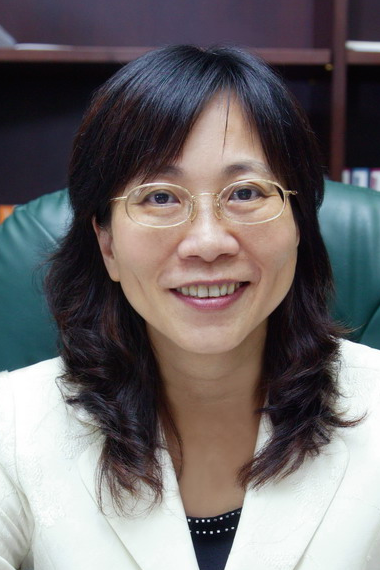

Minister of Council of Labor Affairs
- In office 20 May 2008 – 28 September 2012
- Deputy: Pan Shih-wei
- Preceded by: Lu Tien-ling
- Succeeded by: Pan Shih-wei

Personal details
- Born: 2 October 1961 (age 65) Taipei, Taiwan
- Party: Independent
- Spouse: Huang Tung-hsun (黃東焄)
- Education: National Taiwan University (LLB); Fu Jen Catholic University (LLM); Renmin University of China (PhD)

Wang Ju-hsuan (Chinese: 王如玄; pinyin: Wáng Rúxuán; born 2 October 1961), also known as Jennifer Wang, is a Taiwanese lawyer and politician. She was the Minister of the Council of Labor Affairs from 2008 to 2012. In 2015, Wang was selected as Eric Chu's running mate on the Kuomintang (KMT) ticket for the 2016 Taiwanese presidential election, which they eventually lost.

== Early life and education ==
Wang was born on 2 October 1961 in Taipei and grew up in Changhua County. She graduated from Taipei First Girls' High School in Taipei.

After high school, Wang earned her LL.B. from National Taiwan University in 1984 and her LL.M. from Fu Jen Catholic University in 1988. Her master's thesis was titled, "On the custody of children after divorce" (Chinese: 後子女監護之歸屬).

In 2005, Wang earned her Ph.D. in law from the Renmin University of China in Beijing, China, under legal scholar Long Yifei. Her doctoral dissertation was titled, "Liquidation and Division of Marital Property" (Chinese: 夫妻财产之清算与分割).

== Non-political career ==
Wang was Chairwoman of the National Organization for Women in 1994, Chairwoman of the Awakening Foundation in 1998–1999, executive director of Taipei Bar Association in 1999–2002, and adviser to the Gender/Sexuality Rights Association of Taiwan in 2002–2008.

== Political career ==
Wang served as adviser to Taipei Mayor Chen Shui-bian in 1996–1998, member of the Employment Discrimination Review Committee of the Taipei City Government in 1996–2008, member of Commission on Women's Right Promotion of Executive Yuan in 1998–2003, adviser to the Taipei City Government in 1999–2008, member of the Presidential Human Rights Advisory Council in 2004-2005 and member of the Labor Pension Fund Supervisory Committee of the Executive Yuan in 2007–2008.

=== Council of Labor Affairs Ministry ===
Wang was appointed Minister of the Council of Labor Affairs (CLA) on 20 May 2008. Her term was noted for controversial policies, including the filing of lawsuits against laid-off workers, the implementation of an unpaid leave system, and the so-called "22K policy", which was criticised for decreasing salaries.

She resigned on 28 September 2012 after her proposal to raise the minimum wage in Taiwan was disputed by Premier Sean Chen. Wang was replaced by CLA Deputy Minister Pan Shih-wei.

== 2016 Presidential election ==
=== Appointment to the KMT ticket ===
On 18 November 2015, Wang was officially appointed as the running mate of KMT presidential candidate Eric Chu.

Shortly after Wang's candidature was announced, allegations surfaced that she had improperly profited from property speculation on housing units intended to house military families. Wang responded by suing one of her accusers, legislator Tuan Yi-kang, for defamation while stating that her family had bought three units since 2008. After further allegations surfaced, Wang then listed five properties she and her family owned or had owned while stressing the legality of her actions. A few days later Wang revised the list of properties she had invested in to include twelve units, apologised for having "failed to meet the moral standards expected of me", and pledged to donate the profits from their sales to charity. The case was dropped in January 2016, as prosecutors decided Tuan had done adequate research to bring the allegations forth. However, prosecutors also found that the allegations were false and cleared Wang of any wrongdoing.

=== Election result ===
Wang and Chu finished second in the election on 16 January 2016.

Political offices
Preceded by Lu Tien-ling	Minister of Council of Labor Affairs of the Republic of China	Succeeded by Pan Shih-wei
Party political offices
Preceded by Wu Den-yih	Kuomintang nominee for Vice President of the Republic of China; 2016	Succeeded by Chang San-cheng
