= Lee Chao-ming =

Taiwanese politician

- 李朝明

Deputy Minister of Hakka Affairs Council of the Republic of China
- In office February 2012 – 2013
- Minister: Huang Yu-cheng
- Succeeded by: Liu Ching-chung

Lee Chao-ming (Chinese: 李朝明; pinyin: Lǐ Cháomíng) is a Taiwanese politician. He was the Deputy Minister of the Hakka Affairs Council of the Executive Yuan in 2012–2013.
