= Wang Yi-chuan =

Taiwanese politician and engineer (born 1972)

- 王義川
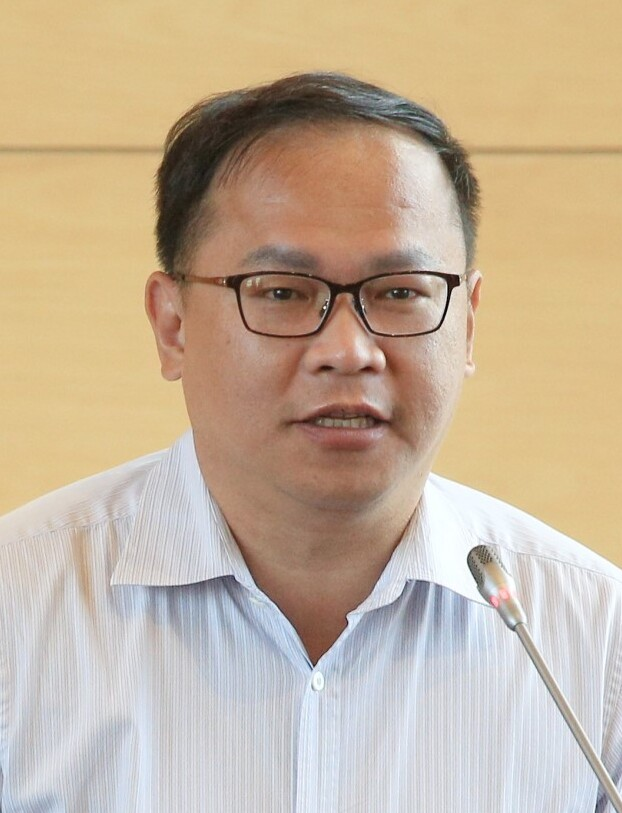
- Wang in 2018

Member of the Legislative Yuan
- Incumbent
- Assumed office 2 December 2024
- Preceded by: Hung Sun-han
- Constituency: Party-list (Democratic Progressive)

Personal details
- Born: 7 March 1972 (age 54) Jiali, Tainan County, Taiwan
- Party: Democratic Progressive Party
- Education: National Taiwan University (BS, MS, PhD)
- Scientific career
- Fields: Civil engineering Transportation engineering
- Thesis: Diversion design of motorcycle traffic space (2002)

Wang Yi-chuan (Chinese: 王義川; pinyin: Wáng Yìchuān; born 7 March 1972), also known by his English name Ivan Wang, is a Taiwanese civil engineer, transportation engineer, and politician who has served as a member of the Legislative Yuan since December 2024.

== Education ==
Wang graduated from National Taiwan University with a Bachelor of Science (B.S.) in civil engineering and a Master of Science (M.S.) in transportation engineering. He then earned his Ph.D. from the university in civil engineering and transportation engineering in 2002. His doctoral dissertation was titled, "Diversion design of motorcycle traffic space" (Chinese: 機車交通空間之分流設計).

== Academic career ==
Prior to working in public service, Wang taught at Toko University, where he served as chair of the Department of Transportation and Logistics.

== Political career ==
During the mayoralty of Lin Chia-lung, Wang served as director general of Taichung City Government's Transportation Bureau. As transportation director, Wang was involved in planning for the Taichung MRT. In this role, he explored installing ground level traffic signs for pedestrians using smartphones, sought to implement a rewards system for dashcam footage of traffic incidents, and upgraded Taichung City Bus stations to save on electricity costs. He opposed the expansion of oBike services to Taichung.

Wang contested the 2019 by-election for a vacant Legislative Yuan seat in Taichung's fifth district on behalf of the Democratic Progressive Party, and lost to Shen Chih-hwei. Wang subsequently worked for the DPP-affiliated Taiwan Thinktank and as a political commentator.

Wang was ranked fourteenth on the DPP party list in the 2024 legislative elections, and not elected to the Legislative Yuan. After the election, he was named director of the DPP's Policy Research and Coordinating Committee. While in this position, Wang stated on a political talk show that the Democratic Progressive Party could use mobile phone data to determine the ages of protesters participating in the 2024 Taiwanese constitutional controversy demonstrations. These comments drew attention in the Legislative Yuan and National Communications Commission, as well as criticism of Wang by the Kuomintang and Taiwan People's Party. Wang himself criticised Kuomintang politician Andrew Hsia for visiting China, and the Taipei City Government for a subcontract signed with Taifo during the mayoral administration of TPP founding chairman Ko Wen-je.

In May 2024, the Taiwan Affairs Office, an agency of the People's Republic of China, sanctioned Wang and four other Taiwanese as "diehard "Taiwan independence" separatists" for disseminating "false and negative information about the mainland" that "deceived some Taiwanese, sowed division ... and harmed brotherly goodwill across the Strait". Wang responded to the declaration sarcastically, urging the Taiwan Affairs Office to undergo "deep self-reflection."

In November, Wang was appointed to the Legislative Yuan, replacing Hung Sun-han, who was elevated to labor minister upon the resignation of Ho Pei-shan. He formally took office on 2 December 2024.
