= Lin San-quei =

Taiwanese politician

- 林三貴

Vice Minister of Labor of the Republic of China
- Minister: Hsu Ming-chun
- Deputy: Shih Keh-her
- Succeeded by: Chen Ming-jen

Personal details
- Education: Chinese Culture University (BA, MA); Michigan State University (MA)

Lin San-quei (Chinese: 林三貴; pinyin: Lín Sānguì) is a Taiwanese politician. He is currently the Vice Minister of Labor.

== Education ==
Lin obtained his bachelor's and master's degree from the department of labor and human resources from Chinese Culture University. He then continued his study at Michigan State University in the United States and obtained a master's degree in labor and industrial relations.

== Ministry of Labor ==
Prior to his appointment as the vice minister of the ministry, Lin has been working with the ministry (and then Council of Labor Affairs) as an officer, executive officer, section chief, deputy director-general and director-general of the Bureau of Employment and Vocational Training, director-general of the Department of General Planning and chairperson of the Institute of Labor of Occupational Safety and Health.

In July 2018, Lin visited the United States with Labor Minister Hsu Ming-chun to visit the representatives of local labor unions in California after a conference held in Montana by the National Association of Government Labor Officials.

In October 2018, Lin led a delegation to Belgium to attend the first-ever labor-related affairs consultation meeting between Taiwan and the European Union, a meeting in which Lin described as a milestone on cooperation between the two sides.
