= President of the Council =

President of the Council can refer to:

- President of the Council of State
- President of the Council of Ministers (almost invariably a head of government)
- Lord President of the Council (a role relating to UK Privy Council)
- President of the Council of Government, a position in the First Philippine Republic aka Malolos Republic as stipulated by the 1899 Constitution of the Philippines on Title IX
