= Chan Huo-shen =

Taiwanese sociologist (born 1949)

Gordon Chan Huo-shen (Chinese: 詹火生; born 10 February 1949) is a Taiwanese sociologist and politician.

== Education and career ==
Chan studied sociology at the National Taiwan University College of Law, then subsequently earned a master's degree from the University of Oxford in 1974. After completing his doctorate at the University of Wales Aberystwyth, Chan accepted a professorship in sociology within National Taiwan University's Department of Social Welfare. He served for some time as chair of the Department and Graduate Institute of Sociology at NTU. While serving as vice chair of the Council of Labor Affairs, Chan retained his NTU professorship. In 1998, Chan was elevated to CLA chair. During his tenure, agreements were reached with Vietnam and the Philippines on employment for laborers from those countries in Taiwan.

Soon after stepping down from the CLA, Chan began working as the convener for social security for the National Policy Foundation. He was also a consultant, and later chair, of the Cross-strait Common Market Foundation. Chan held the chairmanship of the Welfare and Environmental Council as well. He returned to government service as a presidential adviser on national policy during Ma Ying-jeou's administration.
