= Chen Hsiung-wen =

Taiwanese politician and engineer

- 陳雄文
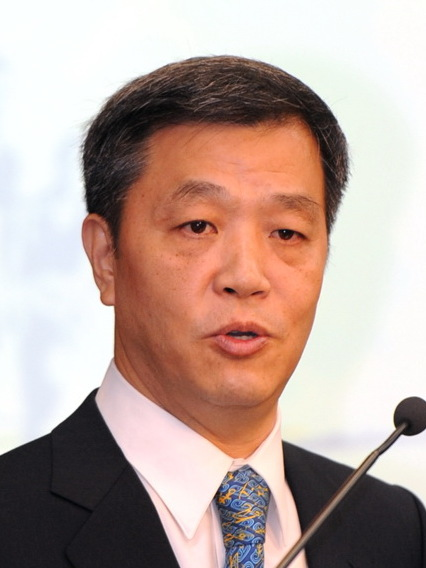

Deputy Mayor of Kaoshiung
- In office 16 August 2019 – 12 June 2020
- Mayor: Han Kuo-yu
- Preceded by: Hung Tung-wei

Minister of Labor of the Republic of China
- In office 20 August 2014 – 20 May 2016
- Deputy: Hao Feng-ming; Kuo Fang-yu
- Preceded by: Pan Shih-wei; Hao Feng-ming (acting)
- Succeeded by: Kuo Fang-yu

Deputy Mayor of Taipei City
- In office 2011 – 20 August 2014
- Mayor: Hau Lung-pin

Personal details
- Born: 12 July 1954 (age 71) Tainan, Taiwan
- Political party: Kuomintang
- Education: National Cheng Kung University (BS, MS)

Chen Hsiung-wen (Chinese: 陳雄文; pinyin: Chén Xióngwén), also known by his English name Sherman Chen, is a Taiwanese engineer and politician. He was the Minister of Labor from 20 August 2014 until 20 May 2016.

== Early life and education ==
Chen earned his bachelor's degree in civil engineering and master's degree in environmental engineering from National Cheng Kung University.

== Political career ==
Chen initially worked for the Kaohsiung City Government as the sub-division chief of the Public Works Bureau in 1984–1986, engineer of the Environmental Protection Bureau in 1986 and division chief of the same bureau in 1986–1989.

Chen then continued his work for the Environmental Protection Administration of the Executive Yuan as deputy director-general of the Department of Air Quality Protection and Noise Control in 1989–1992, director-general of the same department in 1992–2001, director of the Bureau of Environmental Inspection in 2001–2002, director-general of the Department of Waste Management in 2002–2005, inspector of the Recycling Fund Management Board in 2002–2004 and director-general of the Department of Comprehensive Planning in 2005–2006.

By 2007, Chen had been named leader of Taipei's department of economic development. Mayor Hau Lung-pin named Chen a deputy mayor of Taipei in 2011. Chen was appointed Minister of Labor on 20 August 2014, and left office upon the inauguration of Tsai Ing-wen as president on 20 May 2016. In August 2019, Chen replaced Hung Tung-wei as deputy mayor of Kaohsiung. Chen concurrently chaired the Kaohsiung Election Commission.
