= Hsu Chieh-kuei =

Taiwanese politician (born 1932)

Hsu Chieh-kuei (Chinese: 許介圭; born 1932) is a Taiwanese politician.

Hsu served as director of Chunghwa Post and as head of the Council of Labor Affairs.
