= Lu Tien-lin =

Politician from Taiwan

- 盧天麟
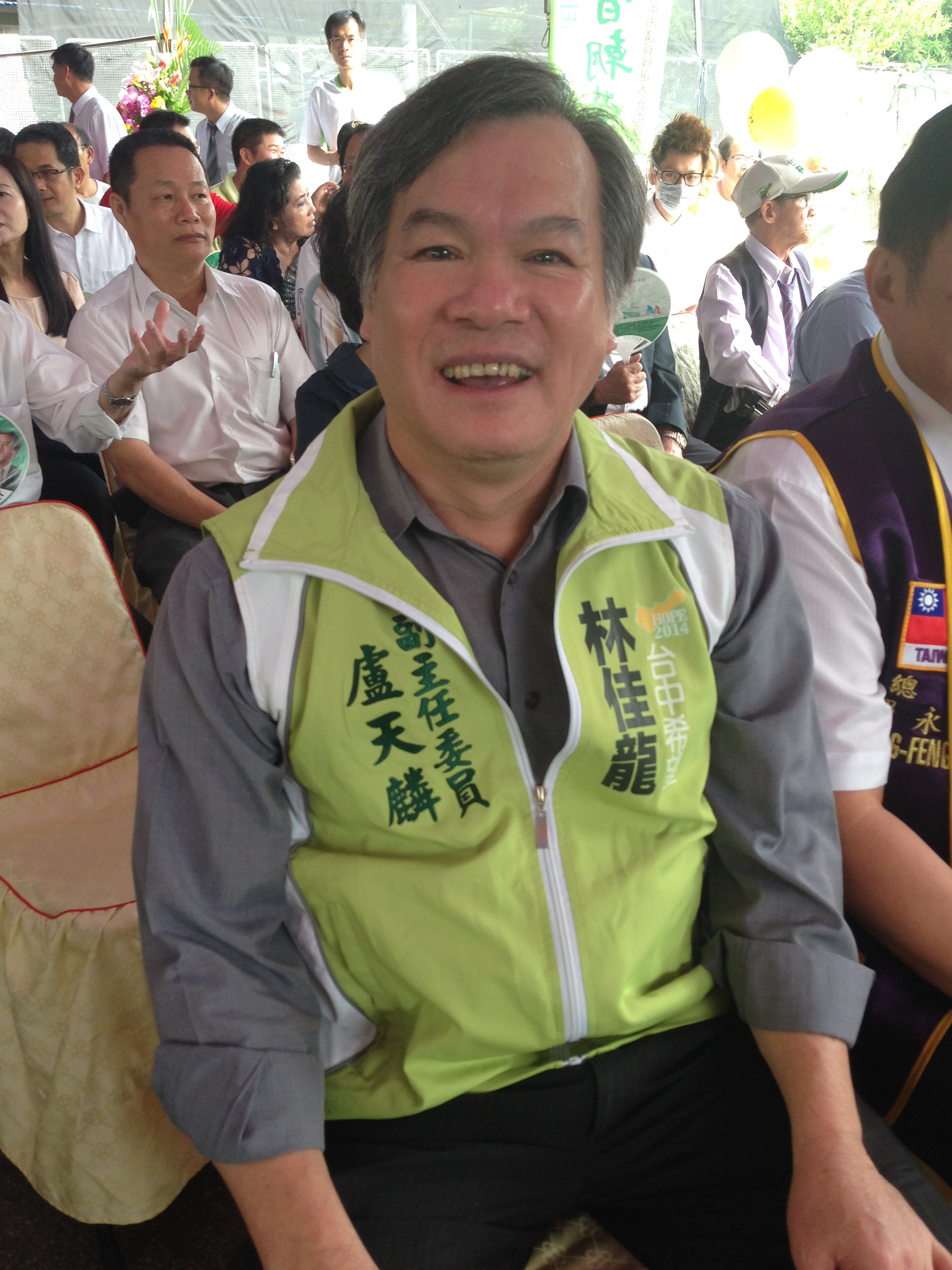

Minister of Council of Labor Affairs of the Republic of China
- In office 21 May 2007 – 20 May 2008
- Preceded by: Lee Ying-yuan
- Succeeded by: Wang Ju-hsuan

Member of the Legislative Yuan
- In office 1 February 2005 – 20 May 2007
- Succeeded by: Yang Fang-wan

Personal details
- Born: 7 November 1959 (age 66) Taichung, Taiwan
- Party: Democratic Progressive Party
- Education: National Taiwan Ocean University (BS, MS)

Lu Tien-lin (traditional Chinese: 盧天麟; simplified Chinese: 卢天麟; pinyin: Lú Tiānlín; born 9 November 1959) is a Taiwanese politician. He was the Minister of Council of Labor Affairs in 2007-2008.

== Education ==
Lu obtained his master's degree in engineering science from National Taiwan Ocean University.

== Political career ==
Lu was appointed as the Minister of Council of Labor Affairs on 16 May 2017 by Premier-designated Chang Chun-hsiung after Premier Su Tseng-chang and his cabinet tendered their resignation.
