= Jaclyn Tsai =

Taiwanese politician

Jaclyn Tsai Tsai Yu-ling
- 蔡玉玲
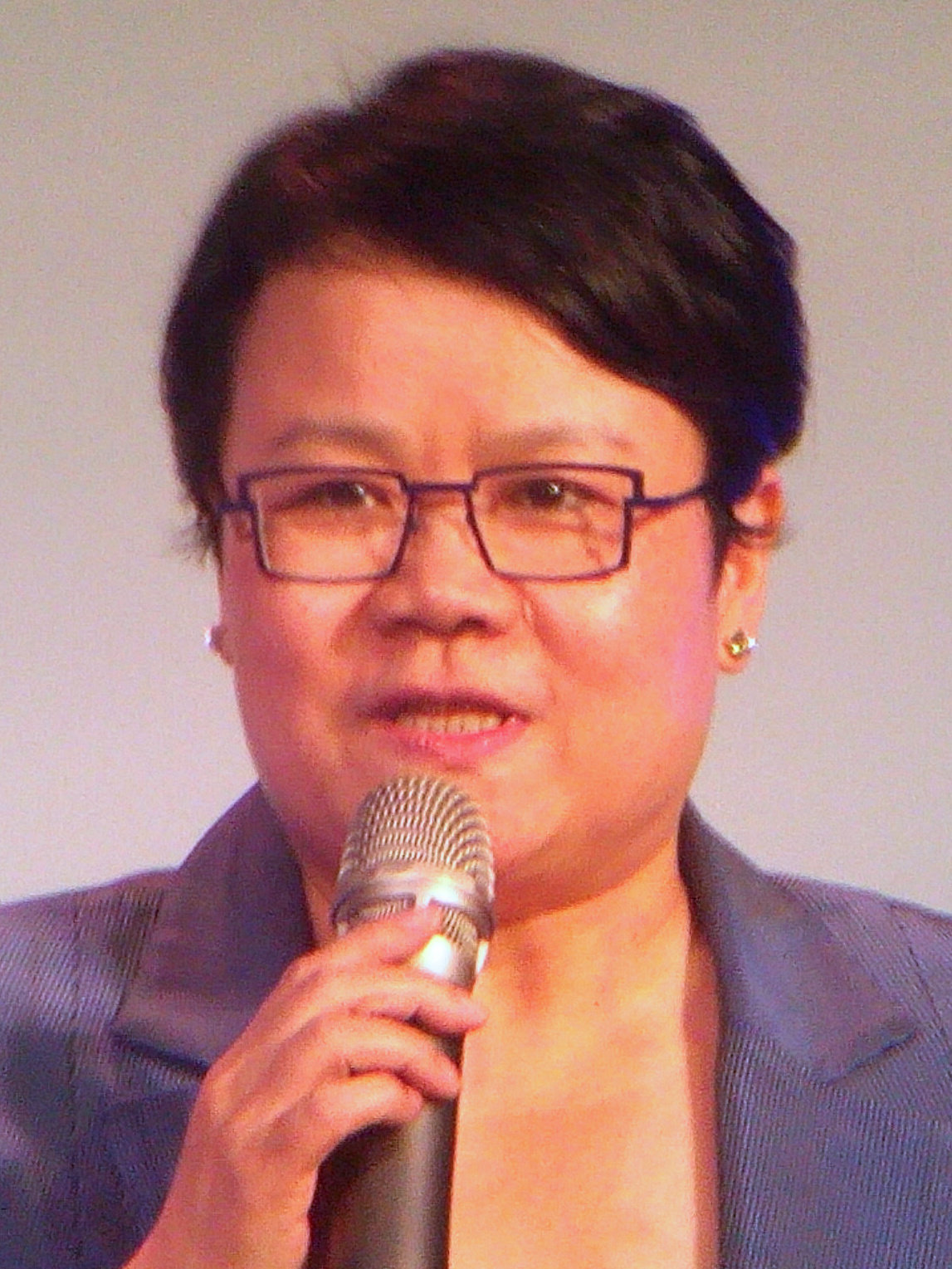
- Jaclyn Tsai at the 2015 Digital Art Festival Taipei

Minister without Portfolio, Executive Yuan / Minister of the Mongolian and Tibetan Affairs Commission
- In office November 2013 – 20 May 2016
- Preceded by: Luo Ying-shay; Chen Ming-jen (acting)
- Succeeded by: Lin Mei-chu

Personal details
- Born: Taiwan
- Spouse: Lee Chung-teh
- Education: National Taiwan University (LLB)

Tsai Yu-ling (Chinese: 蔡玉玲; pinyin: Cài Yùlíng), also known by her English name Jaclyn Tsai, is a Taiwanese politician. She was the Minister without Portfolio of the Executive Yuan from November 2013-20 May 2016.

== Education ==
Tsai graduated from National Taiwan University with a Bachelor of Laws (LL.B.) degree in 1977.

== Career ==
She promoted e-commerce related laws and industrial development, issuing draft Regulations on the Management of Electronic Payment Institutions that were adopted on May 3. The 15 authorization provisions were completed by the Financial Supervisory Commission on May 3, 2015.

She was a founder of Lee, Tsai and Partners (1998 – 2013), General Counsel of IBM Greater China Group (1996 - 1998), General Counsel of IBM Taiwan (1991 - 1996), Judge of Taipei, Shih-Lin, Taoyuan and Chang hua District Courts (1982 - 1991).

=== MTAC Ministry ===
Tsai inaugurated the "Tibetan Cultural and Artistic Festival Activities" in May 2015 that elevated three running themes, including thangka painting exhibitions, public Buddhist prayer, Sanskrit music performances to showcase Tibetan culture and Taiwanese religious festivals. The activities were highlighted by the Tourism Bureau.

== Personal life ==
Tsai and her husband possess assets worth NT$ 100 million in Mainland China. Tsai said that all of her assets are legally obtained and she has declared them to the Control Yuan.

== See also ==
- Mongolian and Tibetan Affairs Commission
- Republic of China–Mongolia relations
- Mongolia
- Tibet Autonomous Region
- Executive Yuan
