= President of the council of state =

The official title president of the council of state, or chairman of the council of state is used to describe the presiding member of a council of state. In many countries with a justice system based on French Napoleonic law, the council of state serves as the supreme administrative court. It is also used for the head of state of North Korea, and formerly used to describe the head of the state in Cuba and of the former communist states in the Democratic Republic of Germany, Poland, Romania, Bulgaria, Cambodia and Vietnam.

== Countries currently using the title ==
=== Head of State ===
- (North Korea) President of the State Affairs Commission of the Democratic People's Republic of Korea

=== Other post ===
- President of the Council of State of Belgium (Head of the Supreme Administrative Court)
- President of the Council of State of Colombia (Head of the Supreme Administrative Court)
- President of the Council of State of Greece (Head of the Supreme Administrative Court)
- President of the Council of State of Italy (Head of the Supreme Administrative Court)
- President of the Council of State of Luxembourg (Head of the supreme advisory body to the Government)
- President of the Council of State of Spain (Head of the supreme advisory body to the Government)
- President of the Council of State of Turkey (Head of the Supreme Administrative Court)

=== As an ex-officio title ===
- President of the Council of State of France (held by the Prime Minister)
- President of the Council of State of the Netherlands (held by the King)
- President of the Council of State of Portugal (held by the President)
- President of the State Council of South Korea (held by the President)

== Countries that previously used the title ==
=== Head of State ===
- (Commonwealth of England) Lord President of the English Council of State (1649–1660)
- President of the Council of State of Republic of Cuba (1976–2019)
- Chairman of the Council of State of the Socialist Republic of Vietnam (1980–1992)
- (East Germany) Chairman of the State Council of the German Democratic Republic (1960–1900)
- Chairman of the Council of State of the Polish People's Republic (1952–1989)
- President of the State Council of the Socialist Republic of Romania (1965–1990)
- Chairman of the State Council of the People's Republic of Bulgaria (1971–1990)
- Chairman of the Council of State of the People's Republic of Kampuchea (1979–1993)

=== Head of Government ===
- President of the Council of State of Denmark (de facto, until 1918)
