= Chung Wan-mei =

Politician from Taiwan

- 鍾萬梅

Minister of Hakka Affairs Council of the Republic of China
- In office 1 February 2016 – 20 May 2016
- Preceded by: Liu Ching-chung
- Succeeded by: Lee Yung-te

Political Deputy Minister of Hakka Affairs Council of the Republic of China
- In office 30 July 2014 – 31 January 2016
- Minister: Liu Ching-chung
- Preceded by: Liu Ching-chung

Administrative Deputy Minister of Hakka Affairs Council of the Republic of China
- In office 1 January 2012 – 29 July 2014
- Minister: Huang Yu-cheng; Liu Ching-chung (acting)

Administrative Deputy Minister of Council for Hakka Affairs of the Republic of China
- In office 2008 – 31 December 2011
- Minister: Huang Yu-cheng

Personal details
- Born: 1949 (age 75–76) Miaoli County, Taiwan
- Education: National Taiwan Normal University (BA)

Chung Wan-mei (Chinese: 鍾萬梅; pinyin: Zhōng Wànméi) is a Taiwanese politician. He was the Minister of the Hakka Affairs Council from 1 February 2016 until 20 May 2016.

== Education ==
Chung born in Miaoli County to a Hakka Chinese family. He graduated from National Taiwan Normal University with a bachelor's degree in educational psychology and counseling.

== Political career ==
Chung became a Department Director of the Council for Hakka Affairs (CHA) in 2001. In 2008, he became the Administrative Deputy Minister of the CHA. He continued to serve the council through its renaming to the Hakka Affairs Council (HAC) on 1 January 2012. On 30 July 2014 he became the Political Deputy Minister of the HAC and became the Minister on 1 February 2016, serving until 20 May 2016.
