= Lee Chi-chun =

Taiwanese radio and television presenter

- 李季準
- Born: 21 March 1943; Taihoku, Taiwan, Empire of Japan
- Died: 22 April 2017 (aged 74); Kaohsiung, Taiwan
- Employer(s): Broadcasting Corporation of China; China Television
- Children: Lee Fang-yi
- Awards: Golden Bell Awards

Lee Chi-chun (Chinese: 李季準; pinyin: Lǐ Jìzhǔn; 21 March 1943 – 22 April 2017) was a Taiwanese radio and television presenter.

Born and raised in Keelung, Lee's career in radio journalism was interrupted by compulsory military service. He began working for the Broadcasting Corporation of China in 1968. Known for his deep voice and longtime association with the BCC, Lee spent the end of his career with China Television.

Lee won five Golden Bell Awards over the course of his career. He was diagnosed with dementia in 2013, and as a result, his daughter Lee Fang-yi accepted his final Golden Bell awarded for special contributions, in his stead. At the 2015 ceremony, she stated, "My father has dedicated himself to radio and it has been his life. Even though he has forgotten much, for him the most important thing is that his listeners still remember him." Before Lee died at home in Kaohsiung, aged 74 on 22 April 2017, he had already been hospitalized four times that year due to complications of pneumonia.
