= Kuo Fang-yu =

Taiwanese politician

- 郭芳煜
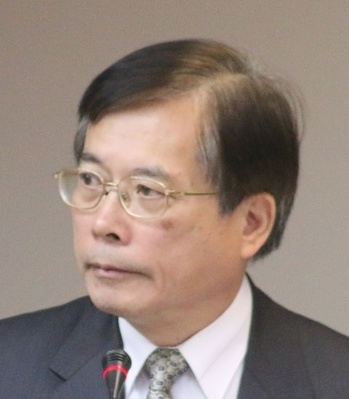

Minister of Labor of the Republic of China
- In office 20 May 2016 – 7 February 2017
- Preceded by: Chen Hsiung-wen
- Succeeded by: Lin Mei-chu

Administrative Deputy Minister of Labor of the Republic of China
- In office 17 February 2014 – 20 May 2016
- Minister: Pan Shih-wei; Hao Feng-ming (acting); Chen Hsiung-wen
- Deputy: Hao Feng-ming; Vacant; Hao Feng-ming
- Preceded by: Himself as Permanent Deputy Minister

Permanent Deputy Minister of Council of Labor Affairs of the Republic of China
- In office May 2006 – 16 February 2014
- Minister: Pan Shih-wei
- Succeeded by: Himself as Administrative Deputy Minister

Personal details
- Born: 1 April 1952 (age 73) Taiwan
- Education: National Chengchi University (BA, MA)

Kuo Fang-yu (Chinese: 郭芳煜; pinyin: Guō Fāngyù; born 1 April 1952) is a Taiwanese politician. He served as the Minister of Labor since 20 May 2016 until 7 February 2017.

== Education ==
Kuo obtained his bachelor's and master's degrees in diplomacy from National Chengchi University in 1975 and 1979, respectively.
