= Chen Ming-jen =

Taiwanese politician

- 陳明仁
- Official portrait, 2024

Minister of Labor
- In office 22 November 2024 – 25 November 2024
- Prime Minister: Cho Jung-tai
- Preceded by: Ho Pei-shan
- Succeeded by: Hung Sun-han

Vice Minister of Labor
- Incumbent
- Assumed office 1 September 2021
- Minister: Hsu Ming-chun; Ho Pei-shan; Himself (acting); Hung Sun-han

Minister of Mongolian and Tibetan Affairs
- Acting; 30 September 2013 – 22 October 2013
- Prime Minister: Jiang Yi-huah
- Preceded by: Luo Ying-shay
- Succeeded by: Jaclyn Tsai

Personal details
- Born: 10 May 1967 (age 59)
- Education: National Taiwan University (LLB); Fu Jen Catholic University (LLM)

Chen Ming-jen (Chinese: 陳明仁; pinyin: Chén Míngrén; born 10 May 1967) is a Taiwanese politician who has served as the acting Minister of Labor since 2024. He was the acting Minister of the Mongolian and Tibetan Affairs Commission of the Executive Yuan in September–October 2013.

== Education ==
Chen obtained his bachelor's degree in law from National Taiwan University in 1989 and master's degree in law from Fu Jen Catholic University in 1993.

== See also ==
- Mongolian and Tibetan Affairs Commission
- Republic of China–Mongolia relations
- Mongolia
- Tibet Autonomous Region
- Executive Yuan
