= Hao Feng-ming =

Taiwanese politician and legal scholar

- 郝鳳鳴

Political Deputy Minister of Labor of the Republic of China
- Incumbent
- Assumed office 20 August 2014
- Minister: Chen Hsiung-wen
- Deputy: Kuo Fang-yu
- Preceded by: Vacant

Minister of Labor of the Republic of China (acting)
- In office 24 July 2014 – 20 August 2014
- Deputy: Kuo Fang-yu
- Preceded by: Pan Shih-wei
- Succeeded by: Chen Hsiung-wen

Political Deputy Minister of Labor of the Republic of China
- In office 17 February 2014 – 24 July 2014
- Minister: Pan Shih-wei
- Deputy: Kuo Fang-yu
- Preceded by: Position established
- Succeeded by: Vacant

Political Deputy Minister of Council of Labor Affairs of the Republic of China
- Minister: Pan Shih-wei
- Succeeded by: Position abolished

Personal details
- Born: 19 September 1959 (age 66)
- Education: National Chung Hsing University (LLB); Aix-Marseille University (LLM, PhD)

Hao Feng-ming (Chinese: 郝鳳鳴; pinyin: Hǎo Fèngmíng; born 19 September 1959) is a Taiwanese legal scholar and politician. He has served as the Political Deputy Minister of Labor since 17 February 2014.

== Education ==
Hao received his LL.B. from the National Chung Hsing University. He then earned a Master of Laws and a Ph.D. in law from Aix-Marseille University in France.

== Early career ==
Hao held several positions in the academia, such as the Vice President, Professor and Dean of the Law Department at National Chung Cheng University and a lecturer at the Judges and Prosecutors Training Institute of the Ministry of Justice.

== Political career ==
At the central government, he has held several positions, such as the committee of the Examination and Review of Labor Insurance Disputes of the Council of Labor Affairs, member of the Committee of the Management of National Health Insurance Fund of the Department of Health and member of the Committee on Attorney Certification Examination Review of the Ministry of Examination of the Examination Yuan.

At the regional government, he was the member of the Legal Affairs Committee of the Chiayi City Government and member of the Petition and Appeal Committee of the Taichung County Government.

== See also ==
- Executive Yuan
