= Lin Mei-chu =

Politician from Taiwan

- 林美珠
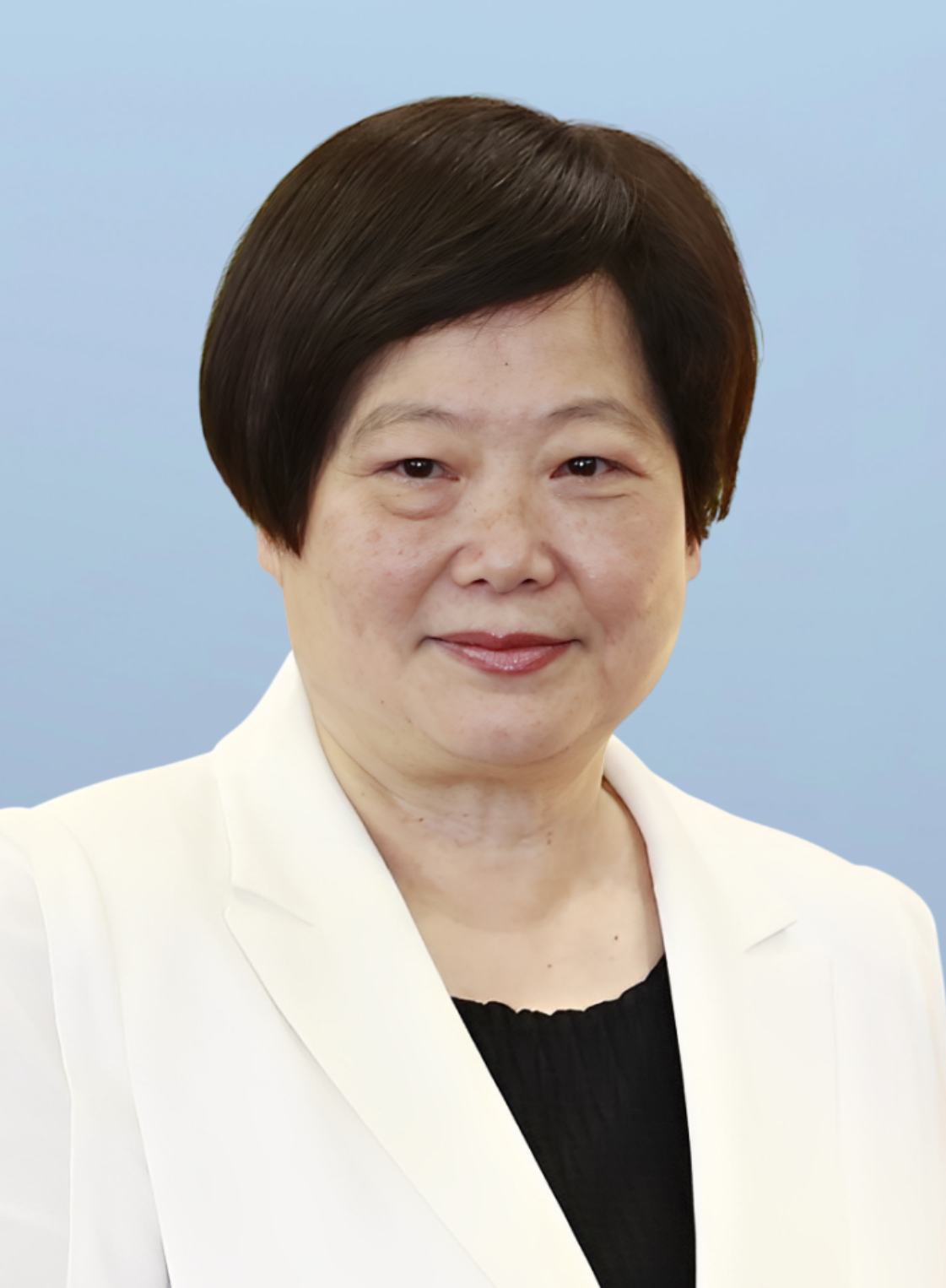
- Official portrait, 2017

4th Minister of Labor
- In office 8 February 2017 – 26 February 2018
- Prime Minister: Lin Chuan; William Lai
- Deputy: Liau Huei-fang
- Preceded by: Kuo Fang-yu
- Succeeded by: Hsu Ming-chun

30th Minister of Mongolian and Tibetan Affairs
- In office 20 May 2016 – 8 February 2017
- Prime Minister: Lin Chuan
- Preceded by: Jaclyn Tsai
- Succeeded by: Hsu Jan-yau

Minister without Portfolio
- In office 20 May 2016 – 8 February 2017
- Prime Minister: Lin Chuan
Additional offices
Deputy Magistrate of Chiayi
In office 17 May 2010 – December 2014
Magistrate	Helen Chang
Political Deputy Minister of the Interior
In office August 2006 – 19 May 2008
Minister	Lee I-yang
Succeeded by

Personal details
- Born: 12 November 1953 (age 72) Taipei, Taiwan
- Party: Independent
- Spouse: Wu Ming-hung
- Relatives: Tsai Ing-wen (cousin)
- Education: National Chengchi University (LLB, LLM)

Lin Mei-chu (Chinese: 林美珠; pinyin: Lín Měizhū; born 12 November 1953) is a Taiwanese lawyer and politician. She was the Minister of Labor from 8 February 2017 until 22 February 2018.

== Education ==
Lin attended law school at National Chengchi University, where she earned her Bachelor of Laws (LL.B.) in 1976 and her Master of Laws (LL.M.) in 1982.

== Political career ==
She was appointed to head the Mongolian and Tibetan Affairs Commission in April 2016. Lin stated in June, shortly after taking office on 20 May 2016, that she preferred handing over the MTAC's functions to other government agencies.

In February 2017, she replaced Kuo Fang-yu as minister of labor. On 22 February 2018, she tendered her resignation from the ministry, citing health reasons. She was replaced by Deputy Minister Su Li-chiung.

Lin was named chair of the Taiwan Asset Management Corporation on 13 December 2018. The next day, she announced her resignation.

== Personal life ==
Lin Mei-chu and the incumbent President of Taiwan, Tsai Ing-wen are cousins. Her husband, Wu Ming-hung, is the incumbent President of the Supreme Administrative Court of Taiwan.
