= Hsu Ming-chun =

Taiwanese politician

- 許銘春
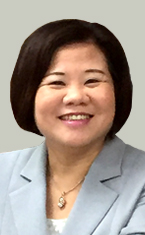
- Official portrait, 2018

5th Minister of Labor
- In office 26 February 2018 – 20 May 2024
- Prime Minister: William Lai; Su Tseng-chang; Chen Chien-jen
- Deputy: See list: Lin San-quei Chen Ming-jen (Vice) Shih Keh-her, Su Li-chiung (Deputy)
- Preceded by: Lin Mei-chu
- Succeeded by: Ho Pei-shan

Deputy Mayor of Kaohsiung
- In office October 2016 – February 2018 Serving with Shih Che
- Mayor: Chen Chu

Personal details
- Born: 21 September 1965 (age 60)
- Citizenship: Taiwanese
- Party: Democratic Progressive Party
- Education: National Taiwan University (LLB)

Hsu Ming-chun (Chinese: 許銘春; pinyin: Xǔ Míngchūn; born 21 September 1965) is a Taiwanese politician who served as the Labor Minister of Taiwan from 2018 to 2024. She previously served as the deputy mayor of Kaohsiung City from 2016 to 2018.

== Education ==
Hsu obtained her bachelor's degree in law from National Taiwan University in 1987. She passed her bar examination soon afterwards within the same year.

== Early career ==
In 1990, she opened her law firm in southern Taiwan. In 2006, she became the lawyer for Kaohsiung Mayor Chen Chu to fight against a lawsuit filed by Chu's opponent claiming that her Kaohsiung mayoralty election in December 2006 was invalid.

== Political career ==
Hsu was the Director of Information Department of Kaohsiung City Government in 2008-2009 and the Director-General of Legal Affairs Bureau of the city government in 2009–2013. In October 2016, Hsu was appointed as the Deputy Mayor of Kaohsiung and served the position until February 2018.

== Ministry of Labor ==
On 26 February 2018, Hsu was appointed to be the Minister of Labor in a handover ceremony from her predecessor Lin Mei-chu who had tendered her resignation earlier on citing health issues. The ceremony was witnessed by Minister without Portfolio Lin Wan-i. Upon her appointment, she vowed to fully implement the labor law and protect the rights of workers.

On 16 February 2024, India and Taiwan signed a memorandum which sought Indian workers to address labor shortages in Taiwan. On February 29, during a radio interview, Hsu stated that the ministry would hire workers from Northeast India due to "their skin color and dietary habits are closer" to the Taiwanese and that they are "mostly Christians who are adept at manufacturing, construction, and farming." Her comments resulted in backlash in India and Taiwan. Democratic Progressive Party legislator Chen Kuan-ting condemned her remarks, stating that "skin color and race should not be criteria for recruiting migrant workers." The Ministry of Foreign Affairs of Taiwan issued an apology for the "not entirely appropriate" narratives by Taiwan's government agencies, while the Labor ministry also apologized for the "inaccurate choice of words" by Hsu. During legislative hearing on 5 March, Hsu apologized for her remarks and stated the Taiwan's labor policies are "crafted with equality in mind and are never discriminating."
