= Tsui Hsiao-ping =

Taiwanese radio personality and director

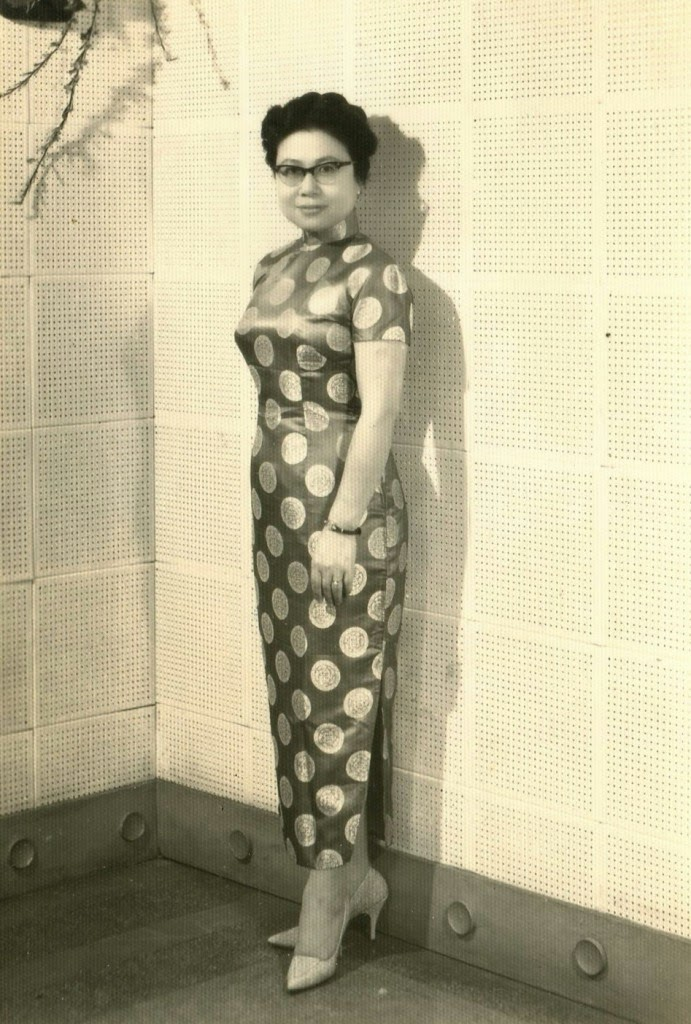
Tsui Hsiao-ping

Tsui Hsiao-ping (Chinese: 崔小萍; pinyin: Cuī Xiǎopíng; 1922/23 – 11 March 2017) was a Taiwanese radio personality and director.

The daughter of a postal worker, Tsui was born in Jinan, China. Her family was forced to move away from their home due to the Second Sino-Japanese War. She studied at Sichuan's Sixth Middle School in Deyang, and later attended National Drama College. Tsui arrived in Taiwan as a member of the touring Shanghai Audience Company in late 1947. When the Kuomintang retreated to Taiwan in 1949, Tsui found it impossible to return to China. Subsequently, she began working for China Broadcasting Company in Taiwan. Her immensely popular show, Broadcast Drama, aired weekly on Sunday evenings. In 1968, Tsui was arrested and charged with colluding with the Chinese Communist Party. After serving her sentence of fourteen years in prison, she was released in 1977. In 2000, she was honored with the Golden Bell Award for Special Lifetime Achievement. The next year, Tsui published her memoir.

Over the course of her career, Tsui taught at National Taiwan University of Arts, Shih Hsin University, and National Taiwan College of Performing Arts.

Tsui died in 2017, aged 94, at National Taiwan University Hospital in Taipei.
