= Wang Panyuan =

Chinese-Taiwanese painter

Wang Panyuan (Chinese: 王攀元; c. 1908 – 22 December 2017, aged 109) was a Chinese-Taiwanese painter. In 2001 he received the National Arts Award of Taiwan. He painted well into his old age, with his last public appearance being in May 2015. Born in Jiangsu, he went to Taiwan in 1949 as a soldier. He died of multiple organ failure on 22 December 2017 in Yilan County, Taiwan.

== Work and recognition ==
Wang's paintings are noted for their poetic introspection and a recurring set of motifs including expansive landscapes, the sun, a red-clothed female figure, dogs, and horses. In 2018, the National Museum of History in Taipei held a retrospective exhibition of Wang's work titled By The Passing of A Thousand Sails, featuring a selection of his watercolour, ink, and oil paintings.

== See also ==
- Taiwanese art
- Chinese art
