= Huang Yu-cheng =

Taiwanese politician

- 黃玉振

Minister of Hakka Affairs Council of the Republic of China
- In office 20 May 2008 – 1 July 2014
- Deputy: Lee Chao-ming, Chung Wan-mei; Liu Ching-chung, Chung Wan-mei
- Preceded by: Lee Yung-te
- Succeeded by: Liu Ching-chung

Personal details
- Born: 16 September 1952 (age 73)
- Party: Kuomintang
- Education: National Taipei University of Education (BA); Chinese Culture University (PhD)

Huang Yu-cheng (Chinese: 黃玉振; pinyin: Huáng Yùzhèn; born 16 September 1953) is a Taiwanese politician. He was the Minister of the Hakka Affairs Council of the Executive Yuan from 20 May 2008 until 1 July 2014.

== Hakka Affairs Council ministry ==
=== Ministry resignation ===
On 1 July 2014, Huang resigned from the ministerial post so that he could spend more time with his family, saying that since the first day he became the minister, he never had the time to have dinner with his family at home.

== See also ==
- Taiwanese Hakka
