= Liu Ching-chung =

Taiwanese academic

- 劉慶中

Minister of Hakka Affairs Council of the Republic of China
- In office 30 July 2014 – 31 January 2016
- Political Deputy: Chung Wan-mei
- Preceded by: Huang Yu-cheng
- Succeeded by: Chung Wan-mei

Minister of Hakka Affairs Council of the Republic of China (acting)
- In office 1 July 2014 – 29 July 2014
- Administrative Deputy: Chung Wan-mei
- Preceded by: Huang Yu-cheng

Political Deputy Minister of Hakka Affairs Council of the Republic of China
- In office 7 October 2013 – 1 July 2014
- Minister: Huang Yu-cheng
- Administrative Deputy: Chung Wan-mei
- Preceded by: Lee Chao-ming

Personal details
- Born: Pingtung County, Taiwan
- Education: National Chung Hsing University (BA); Illinois State University (MA, PhD)

Liu Ching-chung (Chinese: 劉慶中; pinyin: Liú Qìngzhōng) is a Taiwanese academic. He was Minister of the Hakka Affairs Council (HAC) from 30 July 2014 to 1 January 2016.

== Early life and education ==
Liu was born in Pingtung County. He graduated from National Chung Hsing University with a bachelor's degree in foreign languages and literature, then pursued graduate studies in the United States, where he earned a master's degree and, in 1989, his Ph.D. in education sciences from Illinois State University. His doctoral dissertation was titled, "An analysis of act performance and selected noninstitutional and expenditure-related variables as measures of district economic efficiency".

== Early career ==
Upon graduation, Liu worked at National Pingtung University of Education (NPUE), serving as Dean of the Graduate Institute of Education Administration, Deputy President, Acting President and President of the university. As NPUE President, he set up a Hakka research center to promote Hakka cultural research and development.

== Hakka Affairs Council Political Deputy Minister ==
During his tenure as the Political Deputy Minister of the Hakka Affairs Council, Liu proactively assisted in the development of Hakka specialty industries and the management of Hakka cultural parks in Miaoli County and Pingtung County. He was also responsible for liaison and collaboration with Hakka affairs agencies of various local governments.

== Hakka Affairs Council Minister ==
Liu was appointed as the acting Minister of the HAC on 1 July 2014 due to the sudden resignation of his predecessor, Huang Yu-cheng, from his post, citing the lack of time he had during his tenure to spend with his family at home. On 30 July 2014, he was officially appointed as the Minister of the HAC.
