= Awakening Foundation =

Feminist organization in Taiwan

- 婦女新知基金會
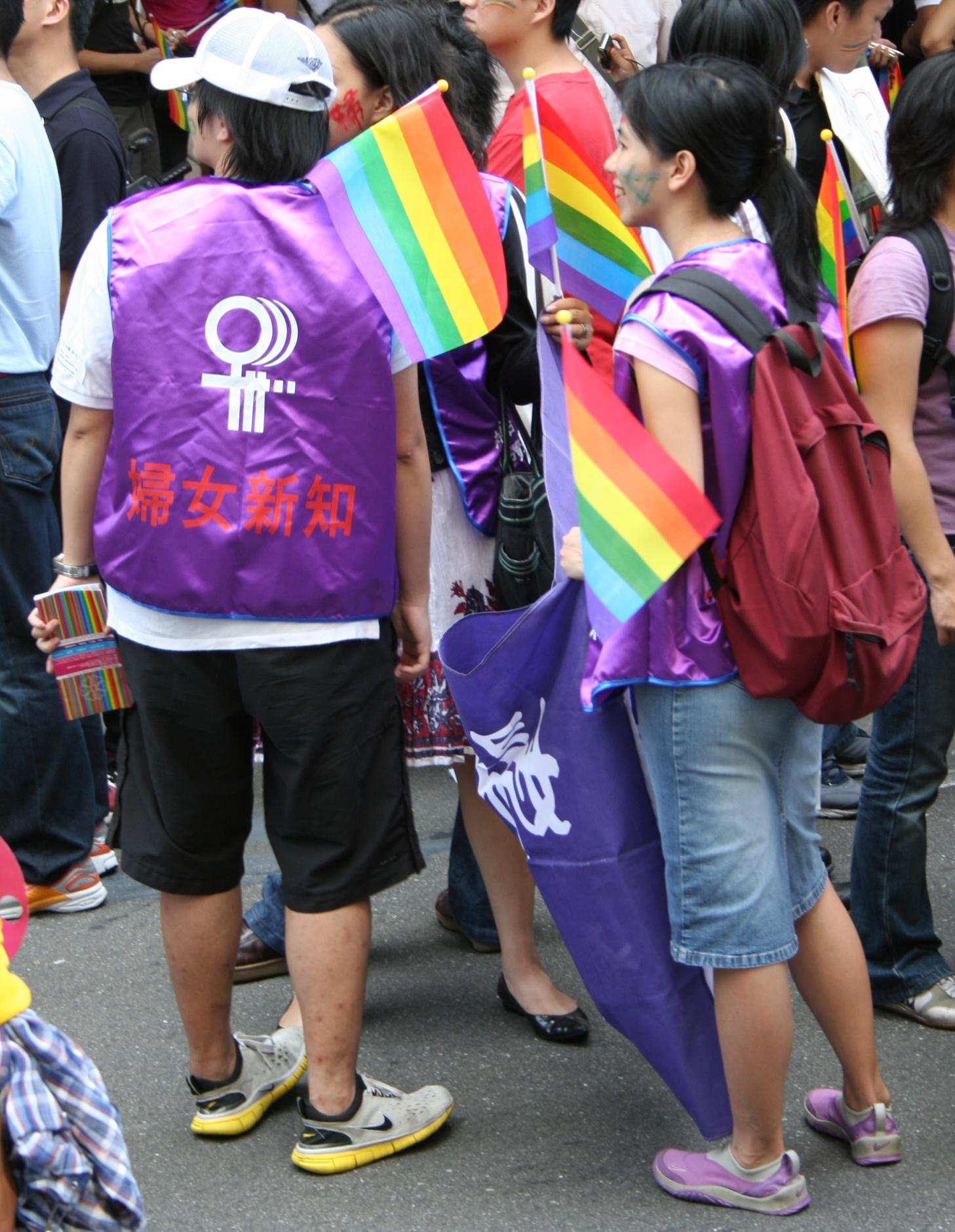
- Awakening Foundation at the Taiwan Pride 2005
- Founder: Lee Yuan-chen
- Affiliations: Awakening Association of Taiwan, Awakening Association of Kaohsiung
- Website: www.awakening.org.tw/chhtml/index.asp

The Awakening Foundation (Chinese: 婦女新知基金會) is a Taiwanese feminist organization aiming to provide the women of Taiwanese society with the resources necessary to combat gender discrimination. Beginning as an offshoot of the gender equality Awakening Magazine, the organization is representative of Taiwan's women's movement that began during the 1970s. The goals of the foundation are to mobilize women to participate in the public affairs of Taiwan, lobby for women's rights, advocate for and enforce policies that reduce gender inequality, promote institutional reform, and provide resources to women in the community.

== History ==
Following the relocation of the Kuomintang to Taiwan in 1947, the Taiwanese people of the 1970s were subject not only to the martial law of Kuomintang's authoritarian power, but also to its ideologies and policies that, though rooted in Confucianism, were highly misogynistic. However, it was also during this decade that the autonomous women's movement, pioneered by Taiwanese feminist Annette Lu, appeared and began to rise in prominence within Taiwanese society. An associate of Lu's who would gain later prominence in the 1980s as a leader of the feminist movement was Lee Yuan-chen. Having lost the custody of her child to her former husband according to the rulings of the Taiwanese family laws, Lee had experienced the gender injustice rampant in Taiwan firsthand. This led to her involvement with the women's movement and the democracy movement, which eventually resulted her friendship with Lu. Thus, in 1982, when Lu faced imprisonment due to her activity in the concurrent democracy movement, Lee and other fellow feminists affirmed the strength of their coalition via establishment of the Awakening Publishing House, a magazine focused upon gender equality.

=== Inception ===
From its inception in the 1980s, the Awakening Publishing House magazine was a literary means through which feminists could publish their articles concerning the societal oppression of women. The objective of the magazine was to encourage women to develop their capacities "to take personal responsibility for their economic and emotional independence." Yet the role of this publication extended beyond its printed product: it also served as the driving force of feminist activism within Taiwan during the 1980s. Members of the organization published articles, organized discussions, and promoted awareness of gender issues to the Taiwanese public. The success of the magazine throughout the 1980s garnered so much financial support, that in November 1987, only four months following the lifting of the martial law, Awakening Magazine Publishing House was converted into a foundation, that would from then on be known as the Awakening Foundation.

The Awakening Foundation consists of a Board of Trustees and an Executive Board. The Board of Trustees is a group of unpaid fifteen to eighteen trustees that are selected by trustees of the foundation. Each Board member serves two years. The Board then chooses six to seven paid members as the Executive Board.

=== Growth ===
At its initial establishment, the mission of the Foundation was both to increase funding for the women's movement and to serve as a formal institution and headquarters that would propagate the movement further. Although the former publishing house had been successful in drawing public attention to the work of many feminists, it failed in winning the active participation of women in lower socioeconomic classes. Recognizing that Foundation was nearly entirely organized by the elite, members focused on distributing the ideas of the feminist movement amongst the masses and calling for an increase in pro-women legislation. The Foundation also founded Awakening Associations in several major cities beginning in 1994, thus launching mass membership opportunities.

However, the structures of these associations began to deviate from that of the original Foundation. Within these associations and their large followings, each of the members elected officers within the respective cities. This resulted in the current separation of the three institutions as the Awakening Foundation and the Awakening Associations in Taipei and Kaohsiung.

To similarly promote the expansion of the gender equality conversation, the Foundation replaced its eponymous monthly magazine in 1995 with Saodong, a quarterly journal that allowed for feminists to discuss women's issues from a variety of perspectives. "Saodong" differed from the Awakening magazine as the original publication reported upon news related to the feminist movement in Taiwan and around the world. This significant change in nature of their publication was then followed by an increase in involvement in legislative action in Taiwan.

=== Legislative initiatives ===
Beginning in 1995, the Awakening Foundation began to actively introduce potential legislation pertaining to women's rights. However, as the association was to remain nonpartisan, it placed emphasis on encouraging women to vote in elections from all political standpoints, as to increase the presence of women in the legislative process of Taiwan.

The passing of the Gender Equity Education Act in 2004 by the Legislative Yuan is largely hailed as a significant achievement of the Awakening Foundation. The law required the inclusion of a "gender-balanced curriculum" from kindergarten to twelfth grade and the provision of gender studies in every university in Taiwan. The Act also made necessary the establishment of a Gender Equity Education Committee in the Ministry of Education in every city and county government and school and university establishment in Taiwan. This, along with several other pieces of legislation, mark the political involvement of the organization (see § Notable achievements).

== Notable achievements ==
1. Introduced the Gender Equality in Employment Bill in 1989, that was later passed in 2001.
2. Established Fembooks, a bookstore and publishing house for feminist literature, in 1994
3. Lobbied for and co-wrote the draft bill for the Gender Equity Education Act in 2004.
4. Co-wrote the Amendment to the Immigration Act (2007, 2001).
