= Pan Shih-wei =

Taiwanese labor relations professor and academic

- 潘世偉

Minister of Labor of the Republic of China
- In office 17 February 2014 – 24 July 2014
- Deputy: Hao Feng-ming; Kuo Fang-yu
- Preceded by: Himself as Minister of the Council of Labor Affairs
- Succeeded by: Hao Feng-ming

Minister of the Council of Labor Affairs of the Republic of China
- In office 28 September 2012 – 16 February 2014
- Deputy: Hao Feng-ming; Kuo Fang-yu
- Preceded by: Wang Ju-hsuan
- Succeeded by: Himself as Minister of Labor

Political Deputy Minister of Council of Labor Affairs of the Republic of China
- In office 2008 – 28 September 2012
- Minister: Wang Ju-hsuan
- Succeeded by: Hao Feng-ming

Personal details
- Born: 27 July 1955 (age 70) Tainan, Taiwan
- Party: Kuomintang
- Education: Tunghai University (BA); Chinese Culture University (MA); Cornell University (MS, PhD)

Pan Shih-wei (Chinese: 潘世偉; pinyin: Pān Shìwěi; born 27 July 1955) is a Taiwanese labor relations professor and academic. He was the Minister of the Council of Labor Affairs from 28 September 2012 and subsequently the Minister of Labor from 17 February 2014 until his resignation on 24 July 2014.

== Early life and education ==
Pan was born in Tainan on July 27, 1955. He graduated from Tunghai University in 1978 with a bachelor's degree in political science and obtained a master's degree in labor studies from Chinese Culture University in 1988. His father was Pan Wan-li (1930–1995).

Pan completed doctoral studies in the U.S. at Cornell University, where he earned a Master of Science (M.S.) in 1994 and his Ph.D. in labor relations in 1998 from its New York State School of Industrial and Labor Relations. His doctoral dissertation was titled, "Employment relations in a changing global economy: The case of Taiwan". His doctoral advisor was the labor scholar Harry C. Katz.

== Political career ==
During the 2008 ROC Presidential Election, Pan wrote the labor policy for Ma Ying-jeou and Vincent Siew ticket of the Kuomintang.

== Council of Labor Affairs Ministry ==
=== Ministry appointment ===
Pan was appointed to be the Minister of CLA after the incumbent Minister Wang Ju-hsuan resigned amid an uproar over her proposal to raise the minimum wage in Taiwan.

=== Taiwan new pension reform ===
In mid April 2013, Pan announced new pension reforms for Taiwan due to the projected Labor Insurance Funds bankruptcy in 2027. He added that the ROC government had launched a series reform methods to sustain the fund for at least another 30 years. He warned that this change would be painful.
