= Hakka Affairs Council =

Government agency in Taiwan

- 客家委員會; Hak-kâ Vî-yèn-fi (Hakka); Kèjiā Wěiyuánhuì (Mandarin)
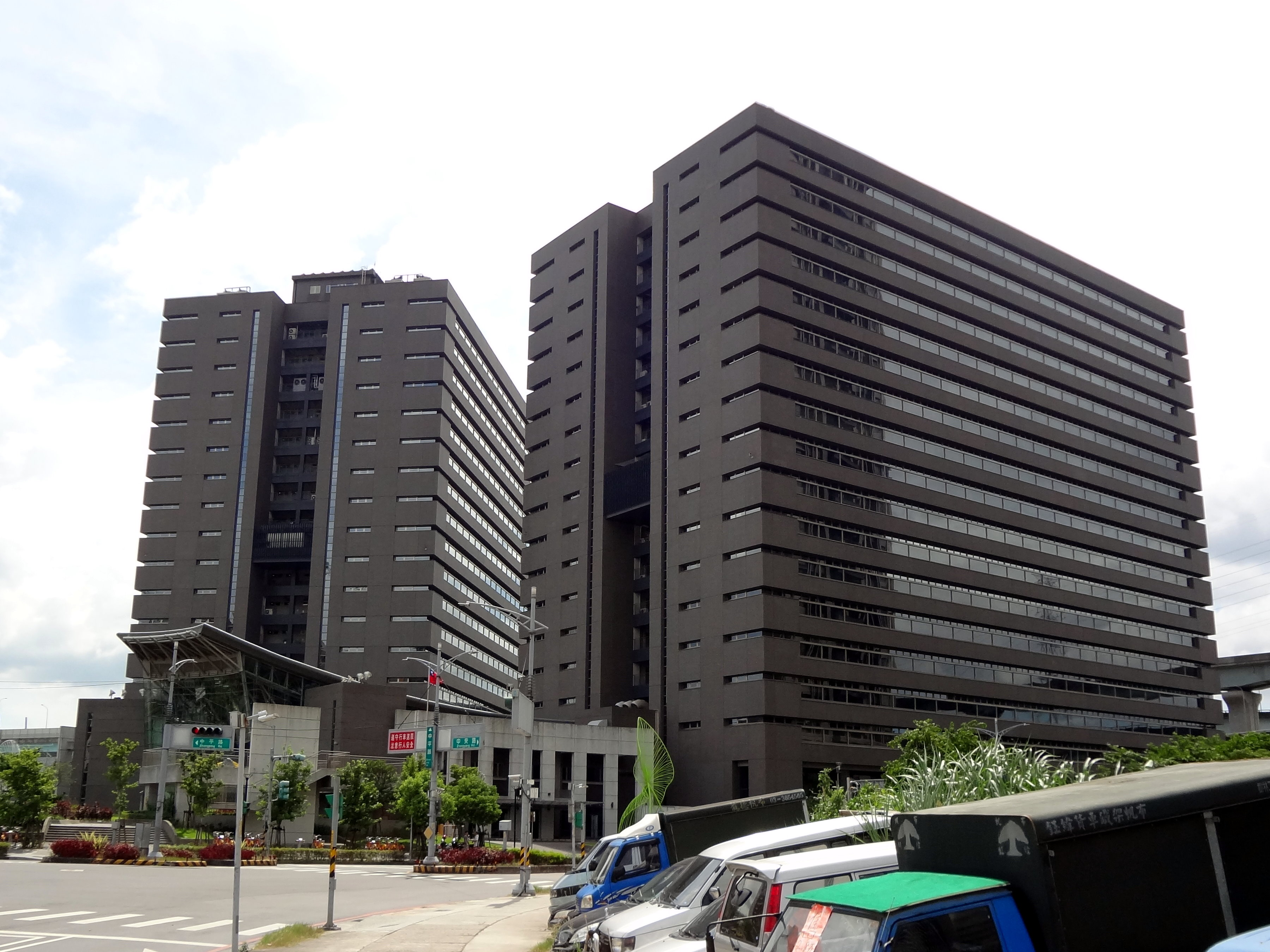

Agency overview
- Formed: 14 June 2001
- Jurisdiction: Taiwan
- Headquarters: Xinzhuang, New Taipei
- Minister responsible: Ku Hsiu-fei, Minister
- Parent agency: Executive Yuan
- Website: hakka.gov.tw

The Hakka Affairs Council (HAC; Chinese: 客家委員會; pinyin: Kèjiā Wěiyuánhuì; Pe̍h-ōe-jī: Kheh-ka Úi-oân-hōe; Pha̍k-fa-sṳ: Hak-kâ Vî-yèn-fi) is a cabinet-level unit under the Executive Yuan of the government of Taiwan. Its mission is to revitalize Hakka language and culture, and promoting Hakka cultural research and exchange.

== History ==
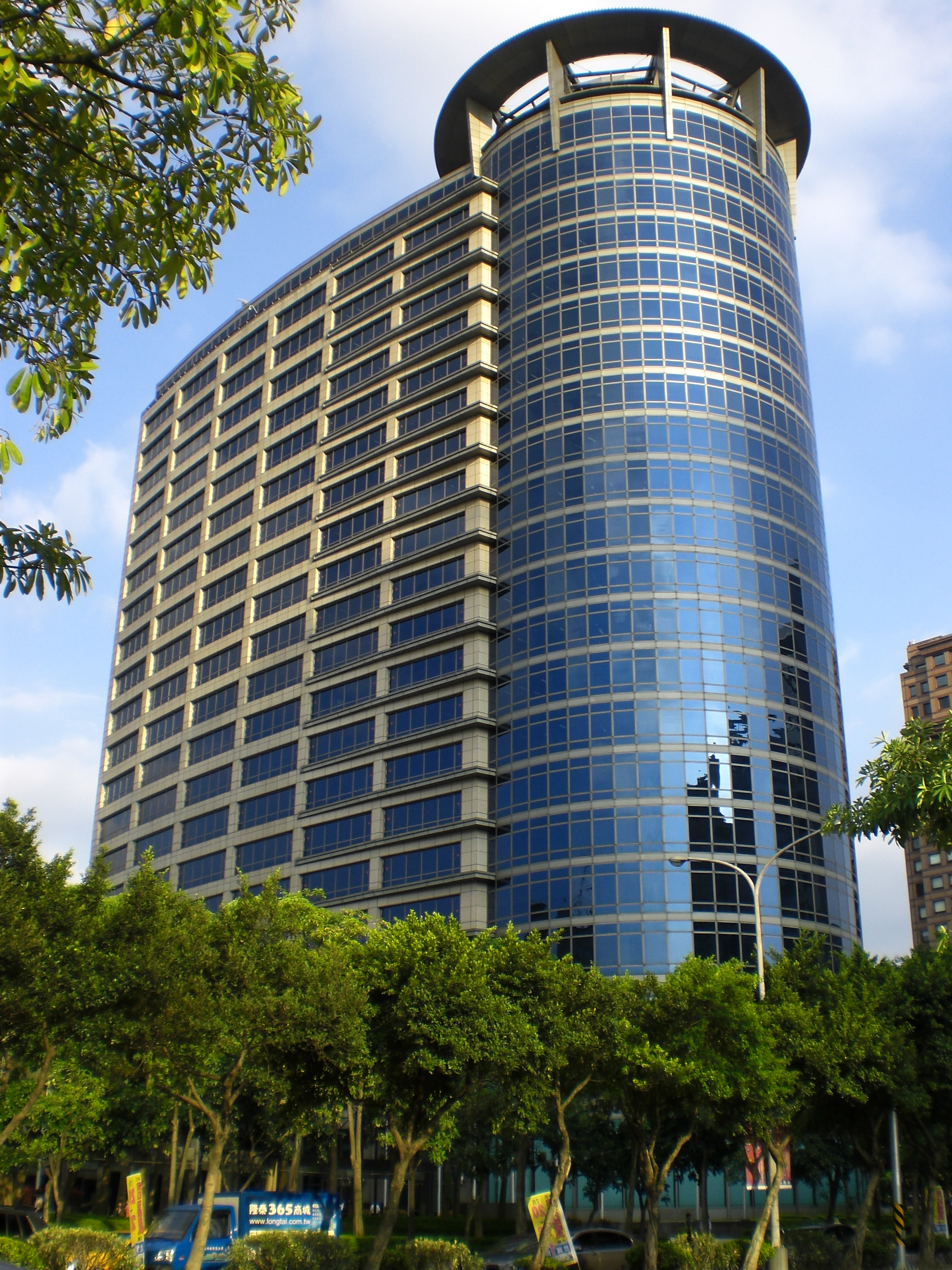
Former location of Hakka Affairs Council

The Hakka Affairs Council, officially established January 1, 2012, is a new agency resulting from the Executive Yuan’s structural reorganization. Its predecessor was the Council for Hakka Affairs, Executive Yuan, founded on June 14, 2001. The Council is the only central authority responsible for Hakka affairs in the world, and its mission is to revitalize Hakka language and culture, build a unifying Hakka identity promoting happiness, confidence and dignity, and become a global center for Hakka cultural research and exchange.

In order to catalyze the Hakka language revival and development, the Council re-structured two departments on January 18, 2021. The Department of Culture and Education is transformed into the Department of Language Development, undertaking the task of building Hakka language infrastructure and strengthening the ethnic language promotion. The Department of Communication and Marketing is re-organized as the Department of Art, Culture and Communication, dedicating to the development and marketing of Hakka cultural content industries.

== Responsibilities ==
To promote ethnic mainstreaming and construct Hakka culture that can be shared by the public through cross-sector collaboration:

1. To formulate Hakka policies and lay the foundation for the rule of law.
2. To develop a Hakka language system and build a Hakka-friendly environment for local communities.
3. To foster innovation of Hakka arts and share diverse cultures.
4. To revitalize Hakka industries and rebuild community-based economy.
5. To strengthen Hakka communication and enhance Hakka prestige.
6. To cultivate Hakka citizens and enable them to connect global Hakka communities.
7. To enrich Hakka cultural resources and find more opportunities for international exchanges.

== List of ministers ==
Political Party: Democratic Progressive Party Kuomintang Non-partisan/ unknown

No.	Name	Term of office		Time in office	Political Party	Premier
1	Fan Kuang-chun 范光群	14 June 2001	31 January 2002	231 days	Democratic Progressive Party	Chang Chun-hsiung
2	Yeh Chu-lan 葉菊蘭	1 February 2002	19 May 2004	2 years, 108 days	Democratic Progressive Party	Yu Shyi-kun
3	Luo Wen-jia 羅文嘉	20 May 2004	14 March 2005	298 days	Democratic Progressive Party	Yu Shyi-kun; Frank Hsieh
—	Lee Yung-te 李永得	15 March 2005	19 June 2005	96 days	Democratic Progressive Party	Frank Hsieh
4	Lee Yung-te 李永得	20 June 2005	19 May 2008	2 years, 334 days	Democratic Progressive Party	Frank Hsieh; Su Tseng-chang; Chang Chun-hsiung
5	Huang Yu-cheng 黃玉振	20 May 2008	7 July 2014	6 years, 48 days	Kuomintang	Liu Chao-shiuan; Wu Den-yih; Sean Chen; Jiang Yi-huah
—	Liu Ching-chung 劉慶中	8 July 2014	4 August 2014	27 days		Jiang Yi-huah
6	Liu Ching-chung 劉慶中	5 August 2014	31 January 2016	1 year, 179 days		Jiang Yi-huah; Mao Chi-kuo
7	Chung Wan-mei 鍾萬梅	1 February 2016	19 May 2016	108 days		Chang San-cheng
(4)	Lee Yung-te 李永得	20 May 2016	19 May 2020	3 years, 365 days	Democratic Progressive Party	Lin Chuan; William Lai; Su Tseng-chang
8	Yiong Con-ziin 楊長鎮	20 May 2020	20 May 2024	4 years, 0 days	Democratic Progressive Party	Su Tseng-chang; Chen Chien-jen
9	Ku Hsiu-fei 古秀妃	20 May 2024	Incumbent	2 years, 139 days		Cho Jung-tai

== See also ==
- Hakka language and its accents in Taiwan
