= Ho Pei-shan =

Taiwanese politician (born 1967)

- 何佩珊
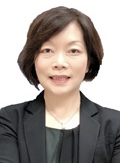
- Official portrait, 2016

6th Minister of Labor
- In office 20 May 2024 – 22 November 2024
- Prime Minister: Cho Jung-tai
- Preceded by: Hsu Ming-chun
- Succeeded by: Chen Ming-jen (acting)

Secretary-General of the Executive Yuan
- Acting; 18 December 2018 – 13 January 2019
- Prime Minister: William Lai
- Preceded by: Cho Jung-tai
- Succeeded by: Li Meng-yen

Deputy Secretary-General of the Executive Yuan
- In office 2 August 2016 – 20 May 2024 Serving with Lee Guo-shin
- Secretary-General: See list: Chen Mei-ling Cho Jung-tai Herself (acting) Li Meng-yen
- Preceded by: Shi Ke-ho
- Succeeded by: Wang Kuei-lien

Personal details
- Born: 29 December 1967 (age 58)
- Party: Democratic Progressive Party
- Education: Fu Jen Catholic University (BA)

Ho Pei-shan (Chinese: 何佩珊; pinyin: Hé Pèishān; born 29 December 1967) is a Taiwanese politician who served as Minister of Labor from May to November 2024. She previously served as the deputy secretary-general of the Executive Yuan from 2016 to 2024.

== Education ==
Ho obtained her bachelor's degree in mass communication from Fu Jen Catholic University.

== Political careers ==
Ho was the deputy director of Policy Research and Coordinating Committee of the Democratic Progressive Party in 2010–2016.

== Executive Yuan ==
Ho was sworn into the position of the Deputy Secretary-General of the Executive Yuan on 2 August 2016 at the Presidential Office Building.

In April 2024, Ho was appointed labor minister. She resigned from the position on 22 November, after a Ministry of Labor employee was found dead by suicide.
