= Supreme administrative court =

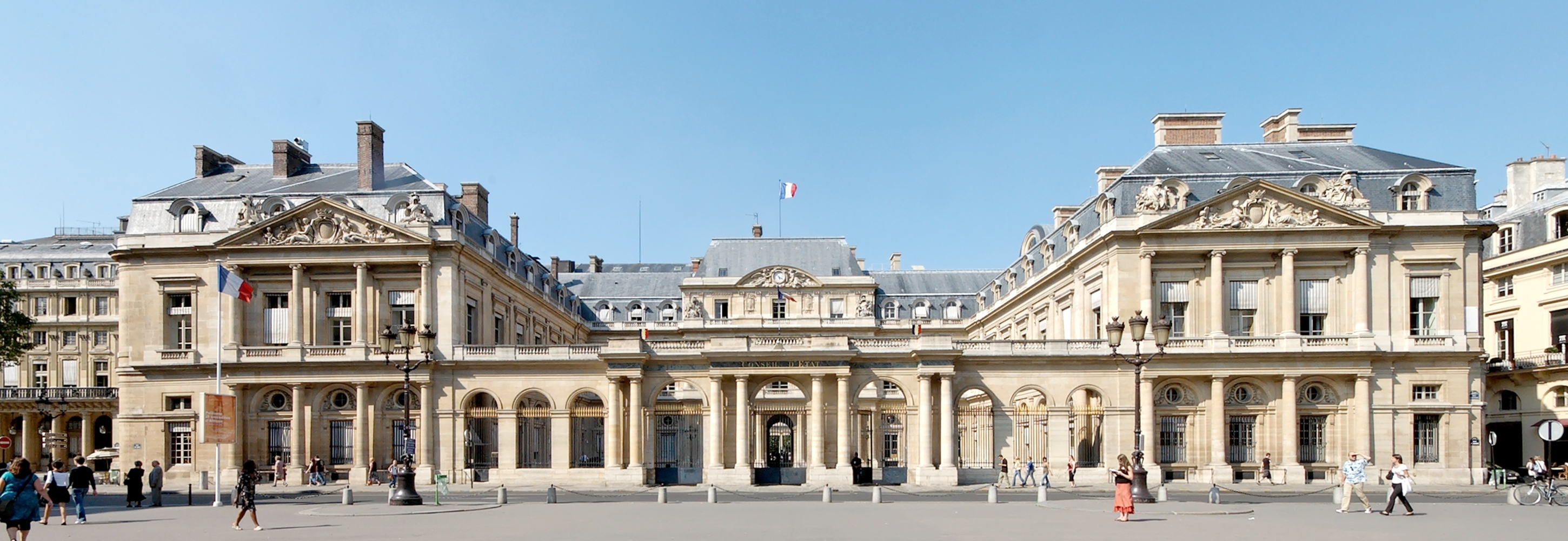
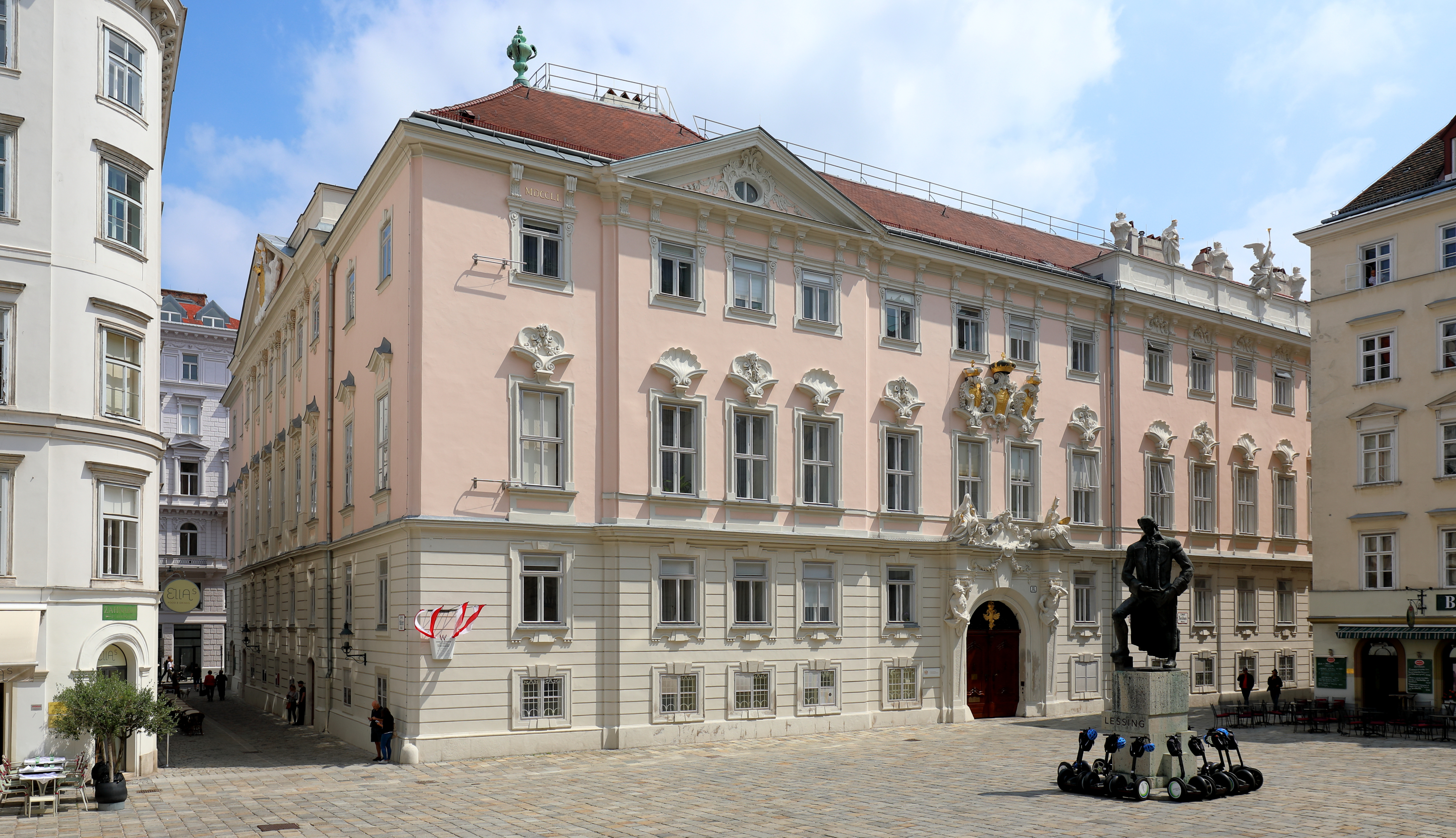
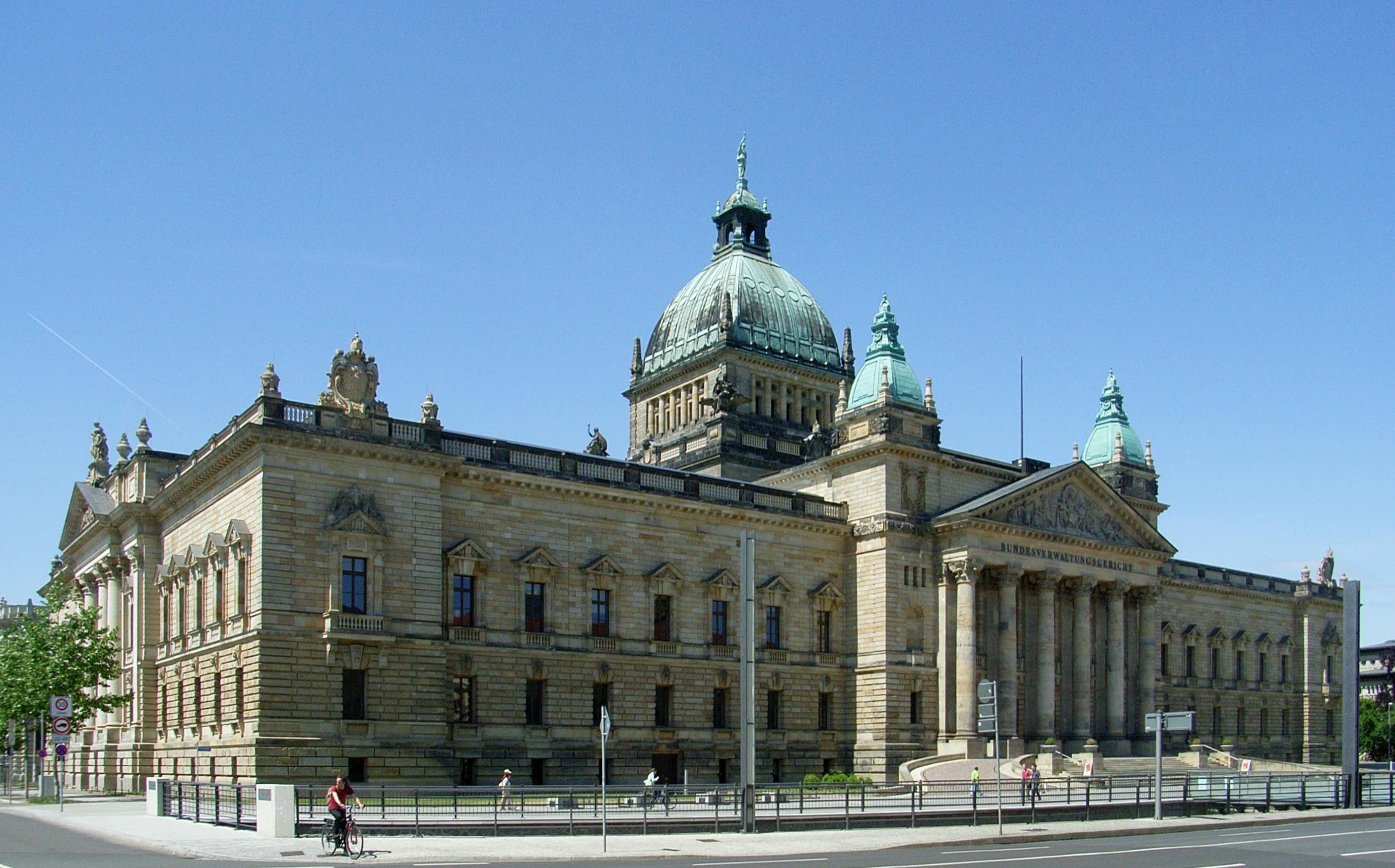
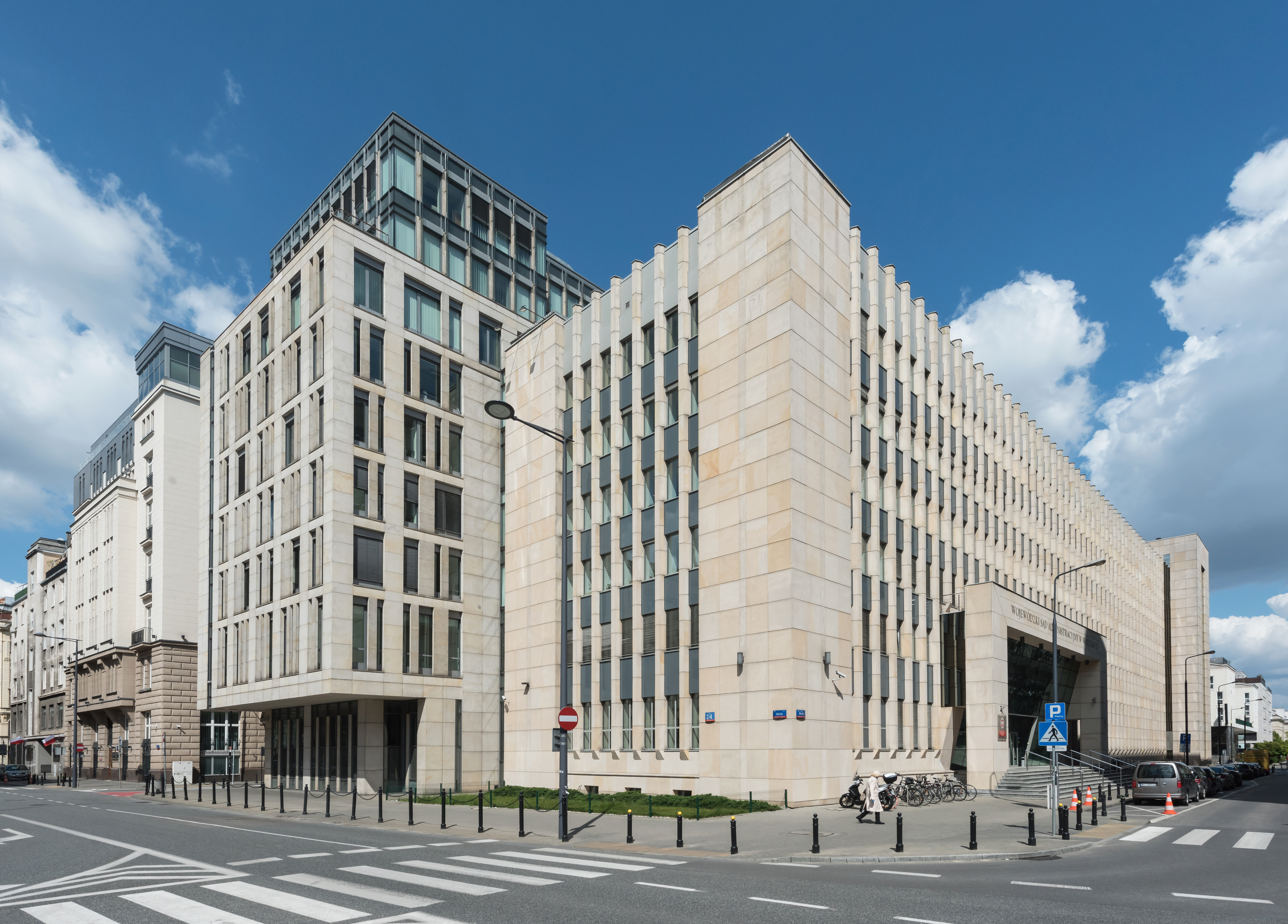
Seats of supreme administrative courts:
- French Council of State
- Supreme Administrative Court of Austria

- Federal Administrative Court of Germany
- Supreme Administrative Court of Poland

A supreme administrative court is the highest court in a country with jurisdiction over lower administrative courts and the administrative decisions of the authorities, but not the legislative decisions (laws) made by the government (which are under the jurisdiction of a constitutional court).

Supreme administrative courts are typically associated with civil law jurisdictions in which they sit atop a hierarchy of first- and second-instance administrative courts; they are not typically found in common law jurisdictions.

== List of supreme administrative courts ==
- Supreme Administrative Court of Austria
- Supreme Administrative Court ("Council of State") of Belgium
- Supreme Administrative Court of Bulgaria
- Supreme Administrative Court of the Republic of China
- Council of State (Colombia)
- Administrative High Court of Croatia
- Supreme Administrative Court of the Czech Republic
- Supreme Administrative Court of Egypt
- Supreme Administrative Court of Finland
- Supreme Administrative Court ("Council of State") of France
- Federal Administrative Court of Germany
- Council of State (Greece)
- Administrative Court of Iran
- Supreme Administrative Court ("Council of State") of Italy
- Supreme Administrative Court of Lithuania
- Administrative court of Luxembourg
- Council of State (Netherlands)
  - Central Appeals Tribunal, for social security and civil service cases
  - Administrative High Court for Trade and Industry, for economic administrative law
- Supreme Administrative Court of Poland
- Supreme Administrative Court of Portugal
- Supreme Administrative Court of Sweden
- Federal Administrative Court of Switzerland
- Supreme Administrative Court of Thailand
- Supreme Administrative Court ("Council of State") of Turkey
