= Ministry of Labor (Taiwan) =

Government ministry of the Republic of China

- 勞動部; Láodòng Bù (Mandarin); Lô-tōng-pō͘(Taiwanese Hokkien); Lò-thung Phu (Hakka)
- Emblem of the Ministry of Labour

- Seal of the Ministry of Labour (勞動部印)

Ministry overview
- Formed: 1 August 1987 (as Council of Labor Affairs); 17 February 2014 (as MOL)
- Jurisdiction: Taiwan
- Headquarters: Zhongzheng District, Taipei
- Minister responsible: Hung Sun-han, Minister; Chen Ming-jen, Vice Minister
- Website: www.mol.gov.tw

The Ministry of Labor (MOL; Chinese: 勞動部; pinyin: Láodòng Bù; Pe̍h-ōe-jī: Lô-tōng-pō͘) is a ministry of the Taiwanese Executive Yuan administering policies relating to employees and labor. The MOL works with various international organizations and engages in bilateral exchanges to elevate the welfare of laborers in Taiwan, administering programs such as Labor Insurance.

== History ==
In 1947, before the implementation of Constitution of the Republic of China, the Nationalist government planned to establish the Ministry of Labor under the Executive Yuan. On 18 May 1948, the Ministry of Society (Chinese: 社會部) was founded by the Executive Yuan, and labor affairs were downgraded to an agency under the Ministry of Society. On 21 March 1949, the Ministry of Society was abolished, and labor affairs were then administered by the a newly founded Division of Labor under the Ministry of the Interior.

On 1 August 1987, the Council of Labor Affairs (Chinese: 勞工委員會; pinyin: Láogōng Wěiyuánhuì; Pe̍h-ōe-jī: Lô-kang Úi-ôan-hōe) was established as an independent agency under the Executive Yuan. The council was upgraded to Ministry of Labor Affairs on 17 February 2014.

In July 1999, the Taiwan Province government was downsized, the Council of Labor Affairs labor take over the original duties from Department of Labor Affairs, Taiwan Provincial Government, and established the Central Office, Council of Labor Affairs, Executive Yuan. January 1, 2013, Council of Labor take over youngsters employment duties from National Youth Commission (Youth Employment Training Center). 2014, Central Office, Council of Labor Affairs reorganized into Skill Evaluation Center of Work Force Agency, Ministry of Labor.

The Taiwanese government had planned to upgrade labor affairs to ministry level. In 1990, the government of Lee Teng-hui amended the Organizational Act of the Executive Yuan. February 2009, government of Ma Ying-jeou amended the Organizational Act of the Executive Yuan, and make sure the Council of Labor will be upgraded to Ministry of Labor Affairs, sending the amended act to the Legislative Yuan.

January 29, 2014, Legislative Yuan pass the third reading of Organization Act of the Ministry of Labor, The Bureau of Labor Insurance, Ministry of Labor Organization Act, Organic Act of Workforce Development Agency, Ministry of Labor, Organization Act for the Bureau of Labor Funds of the Ministry of Labor, Organization Law of Occupational Safety and Health Administration, Ministry of Labor, Organic Act of Institute of Labor, Occupational Safety and Health, Ministry of Labor. February 17, Council of Labor Affairs, Executive Yuan is upgrade to "Ministry of Labor", still rent the part of the office spaces in Empire Garden Plaza for the ministry's administrative units. The other agencies like Occupational Safety and Health Administration, Workforce Development Agency are located in the Xinzhuang Joint Office Tower.

=== Lease space to own office space ===
From the start of the Ministry of Labor it was an independent government agency. It doesn't have its own office space, and needs to rent space from a third party. From 2001 to March 2018, the Council of Labor Affairs rented the office space in Empire Garden Plaza on No. 83, Section 2, Yanping North Road, Datong District, Taipei City.

In June 2017, Ministry of Labor decided they will move to the "Building of Taiwan Cooperative Bank, Taiwan Province" (the old headquarter of Taiwan Cooperative Bank, No. 77, Guanqian Road, Zhongzheng District, Taipei City.). In May 14, 2018, the headquarters of the Ministry of Labor officially moved into levels 4 to 14 of the Building of Taiwan Cooperative Bank, Taiwan Province, and started office hours. However, the Ministry of Labor still wanted to seek its own office spaces.

June 1, 2020, the Ministry of Labor confirmed they got their own office space. The Veterans Affairs Commission published a press release, which said that after the dismissal of their own company, the RSEA Engineering Corporation, the company's office space in the 9 to 13 floor of Chi Ching Building, Songjian Road, Zhongzheng District, Taipei City, will be sold to the Ministry of Labor in 2021. The Ministry of Labor plans to move into Chi Ching Building 2023, and will no longer prepare budget for rent lease.

== Organization structures ==
=== Administrative Units ===
- Department of General Planning
- Department of Employment Relations
- Department of Labor Insurance
- Department of Employment Welfare and Retirement
- Department of Labor Standards and Equal Employment
- Department of Legal Services

=== Staff Units ===
- Department of General Affairs
- Department of Human Resources
- Department of Civil Service Ethics
- Department of Accounting
- Department of Statistics
- Department of Information Management

=== Agencies ===
- Bureau of Labor Insurance
- Bureau of Labor Funds
- Workforce Development Agency
  - Taipei-Keelung-Hualien-Kinmen-Matsu Regional Office
  - Taoyuan-Hsinchu-Miaoli Regional Office
  - Taichung-Changhua-Nantou Regional Office
  - Yunlin-Chiayi-Tainan Regional Office
  - Kaohsiung-Pingtung-Penghu-Taitung Regional Office
  - Skill Evaluation Center
- Occupational Safety and Health Administration
- Institute of Labor, Occupational Safety and Health

== List of ministers ==
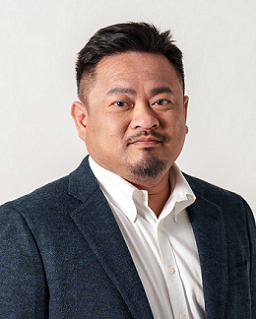
Hung Sun-han, the incumbent Minister of Labor

Political Party: Kuomintang Democratic Progressive Party Non-partisan/ unknown

No.	Name	Term of Office		Days	Party	Premier
Minister of the Council of Labor Affairs
1	Cheng Shuei-chih (鄭水枝)	1 August 1987	February 1989		Kuomintang	Yu Kuo-hua
2	Chao Shou-po (趙守博)	February 1989	1994		Kuomintang	Yu Kuo-hua; Lee Huan; Hau Pei-tsun; Lien Chan
3	Hsieh Shen-shan (謝深山)	1994	May 1997		Kuomintang	Lien Chan
4	Hsu Chieh-kuei (許介圭)	May 1997	February 1998			Lien Chan; Vincent Siew
5	Chan Huo-shen (詹火生)	February 1998	19 May 2000			Vincent Siew
6	Chen Chu (陳菊)	20 May 2000	19 September 2005	1948	Democratic Progressive Party	Tang Fei; Chang Chun-hsiung I Yu Shyi-kun; Frank Hsieh
7	Lee Ying-yuan (李應元)	19 September 2005	20 May 2007	608	Democratic Progressive Party	Frank Hsieh; Su Tseng-chang I
8	Lu Tien-ling (盧天麟)	20 May 2007	19 May 2008	365	Democratic Progressive Party	Chang Chun-hsiung II
9	Wang Ju-hsuan (王如玄)	20 May 2008	2 October 2012	1596	Independent	Liu Chao-shiuan; Wu Den-yih; Sean Chen
10	Pan Shih-wei (潘世偉)	2 October 2012	16 February 2014	502	Kuomintang	Sean Chen; Jiang Yi-huah
Minister of Labor (since 17 February 2014)
1	Pan Shih-wei (潘世偉)	17 February 2014	24 July 2014	157	Kuomintang	Jiang Yi-huah
—	Hao Feng-ming (郝鳳鳴)	24 July 2014	20 August 2014	27		Jiang Yi-huah
2	Chen Hsiung-wen (陳雄文)	20 August 2014	19 May 2016	638		Jiang Yi-huah; Mao Chi-kuo; Chang San-cheng
3	Kuo Fang-yu (郭芳煜)	20 May 2016	7 February 2017	263		Lin Chuan
4	Lin Mei-chu (林美珠)	8 February 2017	26 February 2018	383		Lin Chuan; William Lai
5	Hsu Ming-chun (許銘春)	26 February 2018	20 May 2024	2275	Democratic Progressive Party	William Lai; Su Tseng-chang II; Chen Chien-jen
6	Ho Pei-shan (何佩珊)	20 May 2024	21 November 2024	185	Democratic Progressive Party	Cho Jung-tai
-	Chen Ming-jen (陳明仁)	22 November 2024	24 November 2024	2		Cho Jung-tai
7	Hung Sun-han (洪申翰)	25 November 2024	Incumbent	622	Democratic Progressive Party	Cho Jung-tai

== Access ==
The MOL headquarters is accessible within walking distance from NTU Hospital metro station or Taipei Main Station of the Taipei Metro.

== See also ==
- Executive Yuan
