= Wu'er Kaixi =

Chinese political commentator (born 1968)

- Örkesh Dölet
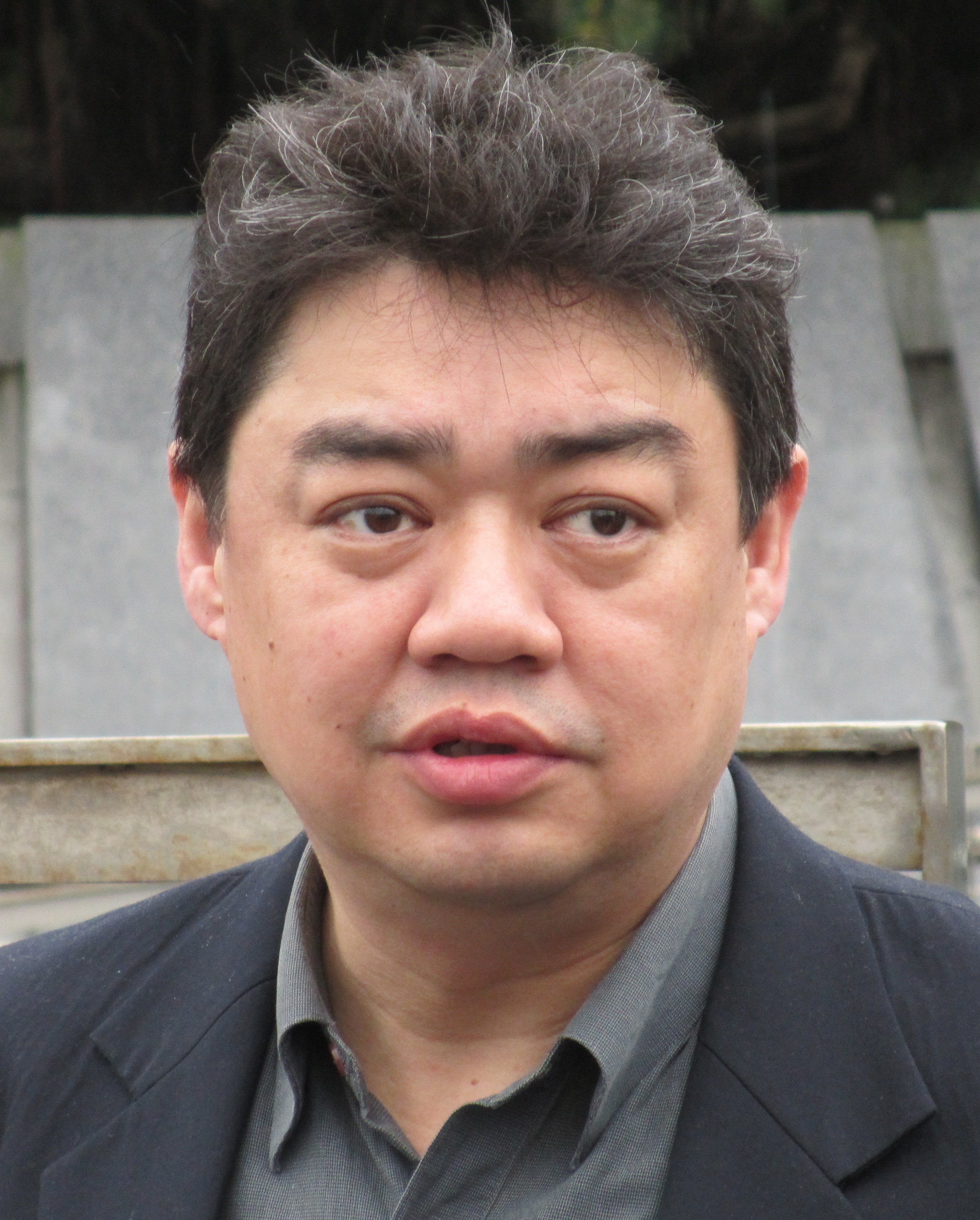
- Wu'er Kaixi in 2013
- Born: 17 February 1968 (age 58); Beijing
- Education: Minzu University of China; Beijing Normal University
- Political party: Taiwan Constitution Association (until 2020)
- Spouse: Chen Huiling

Uyghur name
- Uyghur: ئۆركەش دۆلەت
Transcriptions
- Latin Yëziqi: Örkesh Dölet
- Yengi Yeziⱪ: Ɵrkəx Dɵlət
- Siril Yëziqi: Өркәш Дөләт

Chinese name
- Simplified Chinese: 吾尔开希·多莱特
- Traditional Chinese: 吾爾開希·多萊特
Transcriptions
Standard Mandarin
- Hanyu Pinyin: Wú'ěrkāixī Duōláite
- Wade–Giles: Wu^{2}-erh^{3}-k'ai^{1}-hsi^{1} To^{1}-lai^{2}-t'e^{0}
- IPA: [ǔàɚkʰáɪɕí twólǎɪtʰɤ]

Örkesh Dölet (Uyghur: ئۆركەش دۆلەت; Chinese: 吾尔开希·多莱特, born 17 February 1968), commonly known by his pinyin name Wu'er Kaixi, is a Uyghur political commentator known for his leading role during the Tiananmen protests of 1989. He achieved prominence while studying at Beijing Normal University as a leader of the Beijing Students' Autonomous Federation and as a hunger striker who rebuked Chinese Premier Li Peng on national television.

In 1996, he settled in Taiwan. He ran unsuccessfully for a seat in the Legislative Yuan in 2014 and again in 2016.

== Early life ==
Born in Beijing on 17 February 1968, Wu'er Kaixi has ancestral roots in Ili Kazakh Autonomous Prefecture, Xinjiang.

== Protests and discussions ==
Wu'er Kaixi arrived on the scene in Tiananmen Square, Beijing, in mid-April 1989, the very beginning of the student movement, after having founded an independent student's association at Beijing Normal University. He quickly emerged as one of the most outspoken student leaders as the size of the crowds increased. According to Eddie Cheng, at a hastily convened meeting to form the Beijing Students Autonomous Federation and elect its leader, Zhou Yongjun of the University of Political Science and Law narrowly defeated Wu'er Kaixi to be its first president. After organizing the most successful demonstration of the 1989 movement on 27 April, he was then elected as the president of the Autonomous Union.

Upon meeting Premier Li Peng for the first time in May 1989, in an encounter recorded on national television, Wu'er Kaixi interrupted Li during his introduction, saying "I understand it is quite rude of me to interrupt you, Premier, but there are people sitting out there in the square, being hungry, as we sit here and exchange pleasantries. We are only here to discuss concrete matters, sir." After being interrupted by Li, who said that he was being somewhat impolite, Wu'er Kaixi continued. "Sir, you said you are here late [because of traffic congestion]... we've actually been calling you to talk to us since 22 April. It's not that you are late, it's that you're here too late. But that's fine. It's good that you are able to come here at all ..." Regarding the motives for the protests, Wu'er Kaixi said "So what do we want? Nike shoes, lots of free time to take our girlfriends to the bar, the freedom to discuss an issue with someone and get a little respect from society".

Wu'er Kaixi claimed that he was present at the square when the soldiers arrived after martial law was declared and that he had personally seen around 200 student protesters cut down by gunfire in Tiananmen square. However, according to the Columbia Journalism Review, all verified eyewitness accounts had attested that the students who remained in the square when troops arrived to clear them, had all been allowed to leave the square peacefully. It was later proven Wu'er Kaixi left the square several hours before the massacre inside the square that he claimed allegedly occurred.

== Post-1989 ==
After the protests, Wu'er Kaixi was number two on China's list of most wanted student leaders. He fled to France through Hong Kong under the aegis of Operation Yellowbird, and then studied at Harvard University in the United States. After one year of study there, he moved to the San Francisco Bay Area and continued his studies at Dominican University. Afterward he emigrated to Taiwan, where he has married a Taiwanese woman and started a family. He was a talk show host for a local radio station from 1998 to 2001. In his book, Jesus in Beijing: How Christianity is transforming China and Changing the Balance of Power, David Aikman claims Wu'er Kaixi converted to Christianity in 2002, but this has never been substantiated and Wu'er Kaixi himself has made no public statements about the issue of faith.

Wu'er Kaixi appears frequently on television programs as a political commentator. His standpoint has been to defend the democracy on the island, and promoting civil society. He has often criticized the Democratic Progressive Party (DPP), leading some to consider him to be a Pan-Blue supporter. However, he is now identified as a supporter of Pan-Green politics, and has made statements strongly criticizing the KMT as well. In a June 2014 interview with the New York Times, he stated that while he was 'not a nationalist', if asked to 'choose today', he would 'join the majority of Taiwanese people here for independence. The reason Taiwanese people say we aren't sure, we want to maintain the status quo, is that the status quo is that the mainland's missiles aren't dropping on our heads. That is the status quo they want to maintain. It's not that they like the idea that Beijing claims Taiwan as part of them. It's not so much that they like that China prevents Taiwan from entering any international arena. It's not that they want to reserve a chance to one day go back to China. It's not that. It's just that we don't want war.'

Wu'er Kaixi has expressed a strong desire to return to mainland China to see his parents, whom he has not seen since 1989 after fleeing mainland China under Operation Yellowbird. He has been unable to enter the mainland, and his parents have been unable to obtain passports to see him overseas. On 3 June 2009, he arrived in Macau in transit to mainland China intending to surrender and clear his name in court. On 4 June 2010, he was arrested by Japanese authorities in Tokyo, when he tried to force his way into the Chinese embassy in order to turn himself in. He was released two days later without charge. On 18 May 2012, he tried to turn himself in the third time to the Chinese embassy in Washington, D.C., where the Chinese embassy decided to ignore him completely. He again attempted to turn himself in at Hong Kong in late 2013, and was deported to Taiwan once again.

In December 2013, Wu'er Kaixi helped with the launch of a Chinese version of the anonymous and ephemeral communication platform Kwikdesk.

In 2019, during the 30th anniversary of the Tiananmen Square Massacre, Wu'er Kaixi testified before the United States House of Representatives. His testimony was filmed for the feature documentary The Exiles (2022) which won the Grand Jury Prize for Best Documentary at the Sundance Film Festival. In 2019, he was detained in Taiwan on suspicion of driving under the influence of alcohol. In 2024 he suffered a fall that placed him in a serious coma.

== Politics ==
Wu'er Kaixi's politics are strongly tied to his activism. He has ties to centre-left and progressive human rights and political organizations. In Taiwan, he has "pledged to take a tougher approach to Taiwan's relations with mainland China". Despite recent open support for the Pan-Green Coalition, he still considers himself of Chinese nationality, noting that "China is the home of my parents. Taiwan is the home of my children".

In December 2014, Wu'er Kaixi announced his candidacy for the legislative seat formerly held by Lin Chia-lung, who had earlier defeated Jason Hu for the mayoralty of Taichung in the local elections. A few weeks later, Wu'er Kaixi withdrew from the race, as he felt the by-election and resulting one-year term would not be enough time to accomplish his political goals.

Wu'er Kaixi, backed by the Constitutional Reform Fraternity Coalition, launched an unsuccessful second bid for the Legislative Yuan in July 2015.

In 2019, Wu'er Kaixi showed support for the Hong Kong protests over the Mainland extradition bill and said he saw a connection between this current struggle and that which took place in Tiananmen Square in 1989; "The central government do not want to give its people freedom. It's an identical part [of the two events], it's the same enemy of the people that links the two demonstrations; one in Beijing 30 years ago and one in Hong Kong going on today. I think it will come to the showdown moment."
