= List of ambassadors of the Republic of China to the Marshall Islands =

Coordinates: 7.074811°N 171.319591°E

Taiwanese Ambassador to Marshall Islands
- Incumbent; Daniel D. W. Tang since 29 August 2016
- Inaugural holder: Li Qinping
- Formation: 1 July 1991; 35 years ago

The Taiwanese Ambassador to Marshall Islands is the official representative of the Republic of China to the Republic of the Marshall Islands.

== History ==
Before 1998, there was a representative from the People's Republic of China to the Republic of the Marshall Islands.

== List of representatives ==
Diplomatic agrément/Diplomatic accreditation	Ambassador	Chinese language zh:中国驻马绍尔群岛大使列表 zh:中華民國駐馬紹爾群島大使列表	Observations	List of presidents of the Marshall Islands	Term end
October 21, 1986			Independence	Amata Kabua	
August 17, 1990			The governments in Beijing and Majuro established diplomatic relations.	Amata Kabua	
July 1, 1991	Li Qinping	李钦平	concurrently accredited Micronesia	Amata Kabua	February 1, 1993
March 1, 1993	Zhou Jinming	周锦明		Amata Kabua	June 18, 1905
June 1, 1996	Zhao Lianyi	赵连义		Amata Kabua	December 1, 1998
November 20, 1998			The governments in Taipei and Majuro established diplomatic relations.	Imata Kabua	
October 12, 1998	Leo Fu Tien-liu	刘富添		Imata Kabua	
September 1, 2001	Gary Song-Huann Lin	林松焕	( * December 24, 1948 in Taiwan) married: 1969 Grad., Twn. Prov. Normal College.; 1975 Bachelor of Arts Tamkang College.; 1978 MA, University of Manchester.; 2001 Ph.D., History University of Pretoria.; From 1990 to 1992 he was Chargé d'Affaires, Emb. in Saint Lucia.; From 1992 to 1994 he was Dep. Dir.- Gen., Dept. of Cent. & S. Am. Aff., Ministry of Foreign Affairs (Taiwan).; From 1994 to 1998 he was Consul-General in Durban.; From 1999 to 2001 he was Dep. Rep., Taipei Liaison Office in Pretoria.; From 2001 to 2003 he was Amb. to the Marshall Islands.; From 2003 to 2006 he was Dir.-Gen., Dept. of E. Asian & Pacific Aff., MOFA.; From 2006 to 2009 he was Rep. to Australia.; In 2012 he became Chief Sec., MOFA.	Kessai Note	
January 1, 2003	Lien-Genen Chen	陳連軍	( * October 13, 1950in Taiwan) married: 1974 Bachelor of Arts History National Chung Hsing University.; From 1990 to 1991 he was Sect. Chief, Dept. of European Aff., Ministry of Foreign Affairs (Taiwan).; From 1992 to 1993 he was Sec, TECO in Austria.; From 1993 to 1998 he was TECO in Germany.; From 1998 to 2000 he was Dep. Rep., TECO in Austria.; From 2000 to 2003 he was Dep. Dir.-Gen., Dept. of European Aff., MOFA.; From 2003 to 2007 he was Amb. to the Repub. of Marshall Islands.; From 2007 to 2008 he was Amb. on Home Assignment, MOFA .; From 2008 to 2009 he was Sec.-Gen., Twn., Intl. Cooperation Dev. Fund.; In 2009 he became Representative at TECO in Austria.	Kessai Note	
March 1, 2007	Bruce Linghu	令狐榮達	Bruce J.D. Linghu (*1954): 2013: Taipei Economic and Cultural Representative Office Los Angeles.; Oct 1, 2014-2015 Taipei Economic and Cultural Representative Office Canada.	Kessai Note	
August 4, 2010	George T.K. Li	李自剛		Jurelang Zedkaia	
January 31, 2014	Winston Chen	陳文儀		Christopher Loeak	
September 29, 2016	Daniel D. W. Tang	唐殿文	2011-2012 Executive Secretary/Deputy Director, NGO Affairs Committee, Ministry of Foreign Affairs (Taiwan); From 2013 to 2016 he was Consul General in Busan.	Hilda Heine	
