= Taichung City Constituency 5 =

Constituency of the Legislative Yuan of Taiwan

- Single-member constituency for the Legislative Yuan
- District(s): Beitun, North
- Electorate: 363,225 (2024 election)

Current constituency
- Created: 2008 (as Taichung City Constituency 2); 2010 (current name)
- Party: KMT
- Member: Huang Chien-hao

Taichung City Constituency 5 (Chinese: 臺中市第五選舉區) is one of the 73 regional constituencies represented in the Legislative Yuan, the national legislature of Taiwan. It was created in 2008 (as Taichung City Constituency 2) following a series of constitutional reforms, and elects one legislator, through first-past-the-post voting, to the Legislative Yuan. It has been represented by Huang Chien-hao of the Kuomintang since 2024.

== Legislators ==
Election	Legislator	Party
2008 - 2019	Lu Shiow-yen	Kuomintang
2019 - 2020	Shen Zhihui	Kuomintang
2020 - 2024	Chuang Ching-cheng	Democratic Progressive Party
2024	Huang Chien-hao	Kuomintang

== Election results ==

=== 2008 (Note: Named Taichung City Constituency 2, boundaries unchanged) ===
2008 Taiwanese legislative election: Taichung City 2
Candidate	Party	Votes	%
Lu Shiow-yen	Kuomintang	95,873	57.08
Hsieh Ming-yuan	Democratic Progressive Party	60,582	36.07
Shen Chih-hui	Independent	10,714	6.38
Yang Tsung-li	Third Society Party	791	0.47
Total		167,960	100.00
Valid votes		167,960	98.85
Invalid/blank votes		1,952	1.15
Total votes		169,912	100.00
Registered voters/turnout		282,102	60.23
Majority		35,291	21.01
Kuomintang win (new seat)			

=== 2012 ===
* denotes the incumbent legislator

2012 Taiwanese legislative election: Taichung 5
Candidate	Party	Votes	%	+/–
Lu Shiow-yen*	Kuomintang	129,822	57.87	▲0.79
Hsieh Ming-yuan	Democratic Progressive Party	91,793	40.92	▲4.85
Chi Chao-chuan	National Health Service Alliance	2,726	1.22	NEW
Total		224,341	100.00	–
Valid votes		224,341	98.74	
Invalid/blank votes		2,854	1.26	
Total votes		227,195	100.00	
Registered voters/turnout		301,357	75.39	
Majority		38,029	16.95	
Kuomintang hold				

=== 2016 ===
* denotes the incumbent legislator

2016 Taiwanese legislative election: Taichung 5
Candidate	Party	Votes	%	+/–
Lu Shiow-yen*	Kuomintang	108,446	51.52	▼6.35
Liu Kuo-lung	Taiwan Solidarity Union	84,117	39.96	NEW
Chien Meng-hsuan	Faith and Hope League	14,502	6.89	NEW
Miao Feng-lung	Independent	3,436	1.63	NEW
Total		210,501	100.00	–
Valid votes		210,501	97.94	
Invalid/blank votes		4,435	2.06	
Total votes		214,936	100.00	
Registered voters/turnout		321,452	66.86	
Majority		24,329	11.56	
Kuomintang hold				

=== 2019 by-election ===
Called after incumbent legislator Lu Shiow-yen resigned to run for Taichung Mayor.

2019 Legislative Yuan by-election: Taichung 5
Candidate	Party	Votes	%	+/–
Shen Chih-hui	Kuomintang	49,230	57.78	▲6.26
Wang Yi-chuan	Democratic Progressive Party	32,903	38.62	NEW
Chiu Yu-shan	Independent	2,910	3.42	NEW
Lin Chung-shen	United Party	157	0.18	NEW
Total		85,200	100.00	–
Valid votes		85,200	99.51	
Invalid/blank votes		421	0.49	
Total votes		85,621	100.00	
Registered voters/turnout		337,848	25.34	
Majority		16,327	19.16	
Kuomintang hold				

=== 2020 ===
* denotes the incumbent legislator

2020 Taiwanese legislative election: Taichung 5
Candidate	Party	Votes	%	+/–
Chuang Ching-cheng	Democratic Progressive Party	114,738	44.63	▲6.01
Shen Chih-hui*	Kuomintang	109,466	42.58	▼15.20
Hsieh Wen-ching	Taiwan People's Party	18,768	7.30	NEW
Tuan Ti-pei	Independent	5,225	2.03	NEW
Lai Chien-hao	People First Party	5,100	1.98	NEW
Huang Ming-pai	Independent	2,657	1.03	NEW
Peng Chen-fang	Taiwan Progressive Party	561	0.22	NEW
Ku Chi-hsi	Independent	339	0.13	NEW
Miao Feng-lung	Independent	211	0.08	NEW
Total		257,065	100.00	–
Valid votes		257,065	98.49	
Invalid/blank votes		3,933	1.51	
Total votes		260,998	100.00	
Registered voters/turnout		343,364	76.01	
Majority		5,272	2.05	
Democratic Progressive Party gain from Kuomintang				

=== 2024 ===
* denotes the incumbent legislator

2024 Taiwanese legislative election: Taichung 5
Candidate	Party	Votes	%	+/–
Huang Chien-hao	Kuomintang	134,706	51.55	▲8.97
Chuang Ching-cheng*	Democratic Progressive Party	107,357	41.08	▼3.55
Tsai Shan-wen	Taiwan Obasang Political Equality Party	9,266	3.55	NEW
Chen Wei-hsin	Independent	4,224	1.62	NEW
Peng Chen-fang	Judicial Reform Party	2,647	1.01	NEW
Hsieh Min-fan	MiLinguall Party	2,113	0.81	NEW
Miao Feng-lung	Independent	718	0.27	▲0.19
Lin Tse-pei	Chinese Unification Promotion Party	285	0.11	NEW
Total		261,316	100.00	–
Valid votes		261,316	97.79	
Invalid/blank votes		5,902	2.21	
Total votes		267,218	100.00	
Registered voters/turnout		363,225	73.57	
Majority		27,349	10.47	
Kuomintang gain from Democratic Progressive Party				
