= Bruce Linghu =

Taiwanese politician and diplomat

- 令狐榮達
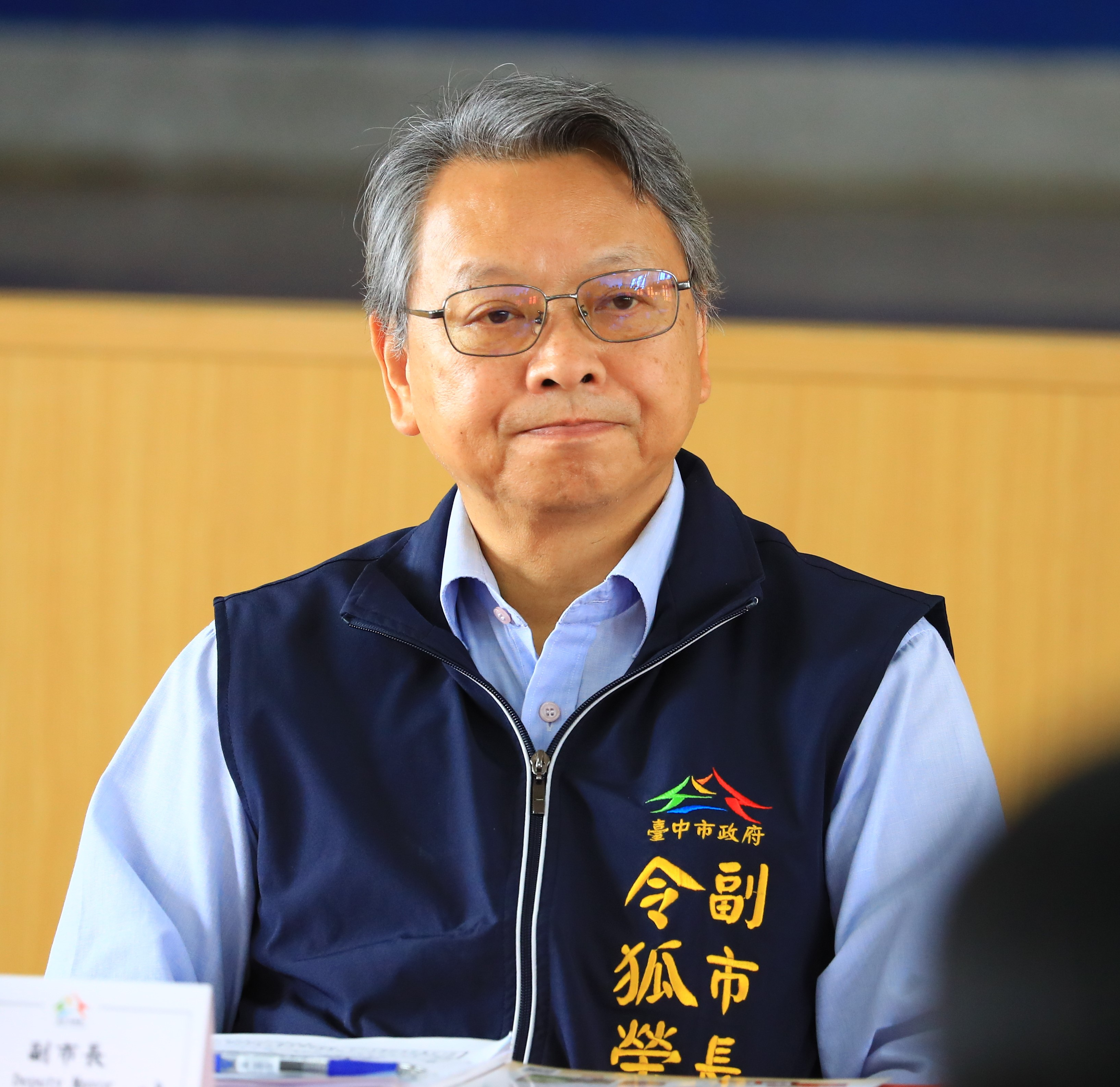
- Linghu in 2019

Deputy Mayor of Taichung
- In office 6 December 2018 – 24 December 2022
- Mayor: Lin Chia-lung; Lu Shiow-yen
- Succeeded by: Wang Yu-ming

Deputy Minister of Foreign Affairs
- In office 24 September 2015 – 20 May 2016
- Minister: David Lin
- Preceded by: Andrew Kao
- Succeeded by: Wu Chih-chung

Taiwanese Representative to Canada
- In office August 2014 – September 2015
- President: Ma Ying-jeou
- Preceded by: Liu Chih-kung
- Succeeded by: Wu Jung-chyuan

Taiwanese Ambassador to the Marshall Islands
- In office 2007–2010
- President: Chen Shui-bian; Ma Ying-jeou

Personal details
- Born: January 1954 (age 72)
- Education: National Taiwan Normal University (BA); Tamkang University (MA); University of Oxford (MPhil)

Bruce Jung Da Linghu (Chinese: 令狐榮達; pinyin: Lìnghú Róngdá; born January 1954) is a Taiwanese diplomat. He was the Deputy Minister of Foreign Affairs (MOFA) from 24 September 2015 until 20 May 2016.

== Education ==
Linghu graduated from National Taiwan Normal University in 1975 with a Bachelor of Arts in English and then earned a Master of Arts in American studies from Tamkang University in 1979. He then pursued advanced studies at the University of Oxford in the United Kingdom from 1982 to 1983.

== Political career ==
In 1982-1985, he worked under the Department of Protocol and Department of North American Affairs of MOFA and in 1985-1987, he became a special assistant to the Deputy Minister of MOFA. In 1987-1993, he was the senior assistant for the Taipei Economic and Cultural Office (TECO) in Los Angeles, United States. In 1993-1995, he became a senior assistant to the Vice Minister of MOFA. In 1995-1997, he was the Division Director of TECO in San Francisco. In 1997-2001, he became the Deputy Director-General of TECO in Los Angeles. In 2001-2004, he was the Deputy Director-General of Department of North American Affairs of the MOFA. In 2004-2007, he was the Director-General of TECO in Auckland, New Zealand.
