= Lu Shiow-yen =

Taiwanese politician and television presenter (born 1961)

- 盧秀燕
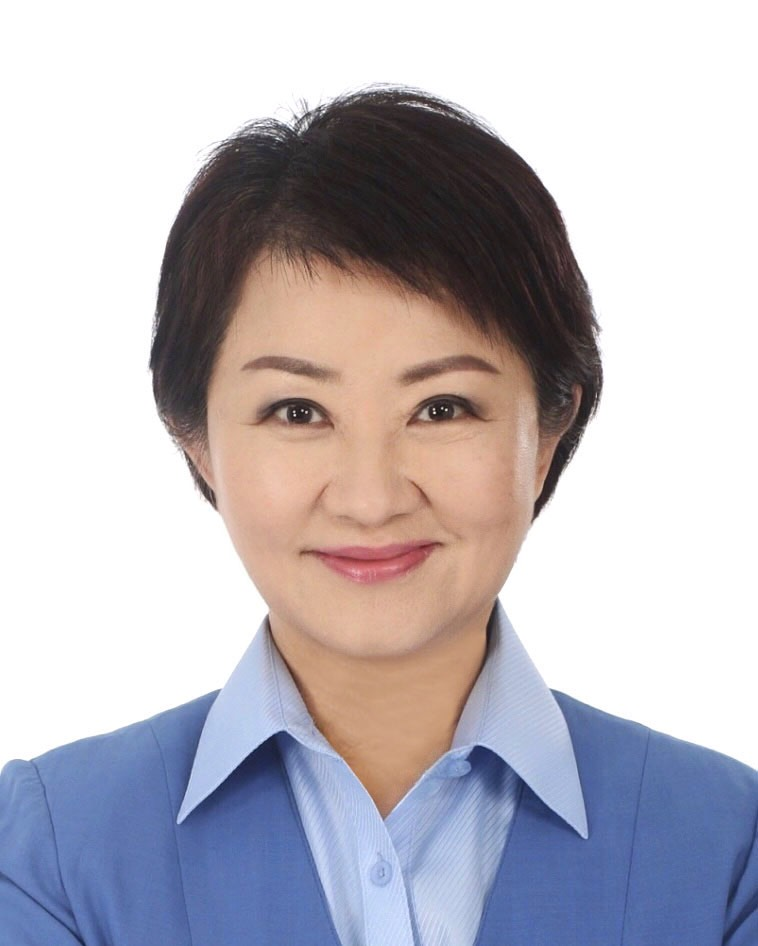
- Official portrait, 2018

3rd Mayor of Taichung
- Incumbent
- Assumed office 25 December 2018
- Deputy: See list: Bruce Linghu Chen Zi-jing Huang Guo-rong
- Preceded by: Lin Chia-lung

Member of the Legislative Yuan
- In office 1 February 2008 – 20 November 2018
- Succeeded by: Shen Chih-hwei
- Constituency: Taichung 2→Taichung 5
- In office 1 February 1999 – 20 November 2008
- Constituency: Taichung

Personal details
- Born: 31 August 1961 (age 65) Anle District, Keelung City, Taiwan
- Party: Kuomintang
- Spouse: Liao Shu-chia
- Children: 2
- Education: National Chengchi University (BA); Tamkang University (MA)

Lu Shiow-yen (Chinese: 盧秀燕; pinyin: Lú Xiùyàn; born 31 August 1961) is a Taiwanese politician and former television presenter. She has been the 3rd mayor of Taichung since 2018.

== Early life and education ==
Lu was born on August 31, 1961, in Keelung, Taiwan. She was the eldest of three daughters. Her younger sister, Lu Hsiu-fang, also became a news anchor. Her father was a soldier and native of Shandong, China, who came to Taiwan following his involvement in the Korean War. Her mother was a worker in a factory owned by the family. Her maternal grandfather came from a prominent family in Hsinchu and traveled to Japan to study at a railway school during the Japanese colonial period. Her mother spent part of her childhood in Japan, returning to Taiwan at age eight.

Lu was raised by her maternal grandparents because her father's military service required him to relocate frequently. She graduated from National Keelung Girls' Senior High School before moving to Taipei for college. She then graduated from National Chengchi University with a bachelor's degree in land administration. She later earned a master's degree in international affairs in 2004 from Tamkang University. Her master's thesis was titled, A Study of National Security and the Legislative Yuan's Classified Budget System (國家安全與立法院機密預算審查制度).

== Journalism career ==
After college, Lu became a broadcast journalist despite having studied land administration, eventually joining the Chinese Television System (CTS) after applying for a reporting position. She began working as a reporter for CTS in 1983. During her early years at the network, Lu also presented weather forecasts on CTS Evening News (華視晚間新聞). She subsequently moved into reporting on social affairs and public-interest issues. Her responsibilities at CTS also included working as an executive producer in the network's news department.

In July 1989, Lu investigated organizations suspected of misusing charitable donations collected through the sale of magazines ostensibly intended to support disadvantaged people. The investigation began after she observed students selling charitable magazines near the Gongguan area of Taipei on July 26, prompting her to visit the magazine's publisher in Taoyuan the following day. Following her initial broadcast, viewers contacted CTS with further allegations involving the publications Warmth (溫暖) and Huai'en (懷恩). At the same time, Lu received threats demanding that she discontinue her reporting. Because of concerns for her safety, CTS security personnel escorted her to a taxi when she left work at night. The resulting investigative series, titled False Charity, Real Profiteering (假愛心真斂財), was broadcast on CTS Evening News. In 1990, Lu and her colleagues Li Tingyong (李廷勇) and Xiao Xiaoshan (蕭小山) received the Best News Reporting Award at the 25th Golden Bell Awards for the series.

In late 1990, Lu was transferred to Taichung and appointed director of CTS's central Taiwan news bureau. She was the first woman to head a television news bureau in central Taiwan.

Before her first election campaign, the Kuomintang approached Lu about standing as a candidate for the Taiwan Provincial Assembly, seeking a prominent female candidate to compete against the Democratic Progressive Party's Chang Wen-ying. After considering the proposal, Lu agreed to enter the race. In 1994, she left CTS after approximately eleven years in journalism and won election to the tenth Taiwan Provincial Assembly.

== Legislative Yuan ==
=== Early terms (1999–2008) ===
Lu was elected to the Legislative Yuan in 1998 as a KMT candidate. She assumed office on 1 February 1999, representing the then-multimember Taichung City constituency in the fourth Legislative Yuan. She was subsequently reelected to the fifth and sixth Legislative Yuan, serving consecutive terms from 2002 to 2005 and 2005 to 2008, respectively.

During her first term, Lu served on the National Defense Committee, Economic Committee, Procedure Committee, and Expenditure Audit Committee, including a term as a convenor of the National Defense Committee. In the fifth Legislative Yuan, she continued serving on the National Defense Committee and participated in the Constitutional Amendment Committee throughout the term. She also served on the Budget and Final Accounts Committee and was a convenor of the National Defense Committee during the fourth legislative session.

During her third term, Lu served on the National Defense Committee, Education and Culture Committee, Judicial Committee, and Discipline Committee. She chaired the National Defense Committee during the first legislative session and the Education and Culture Committee during the fourth session.

=== Later terms (2008–2018) ===
Lu won reelection in the 2008 Taiwanese legislative election, receiving 95,873 votes, or 57.08% of the vote, against Democratic Progressive Party candidate Hsieh Ming-yuan and independent candidate Shen Chih-hwei. In the seventh Legislative Yuan, she served on the Finance Committee throughout all eight legislative sessions and was a committee convenor during the first two sessions.

Lu was reelected in the 2012 Taiwanese legislative election with 129,822 votes, representing 57.86% of the vote, defeating Democratic Progressive Party candidate Hsieh Ming-yuan, who received 91,793 votes. During the eighth Legislative Yuan, she continued serving on the Finance Committee and participated in the Constitutional Amendment Committee.

Lu won a sixth consecutive term in the 2016 Taiwanese legislative election, receiving 108,446 votes, or 51.52% of the vote, against Taiwan Solidarity Union candidate Liu Kuo-lung, who received 84,117 votes. In the ninth Legislative Yuan, she continued serving on the Finance Committee and was a convenor of both the Finance Committee and the Discipline Committee during the first legislative session.

Lu served as president of the Legislative Yuan's Health and Welfare Caucus (立法院厚生會) during the organization's 25th and 26th terms.

== 2018 Taichung City mayor election ==
Lu resigned from the legislature in 20 November 2018 before the 2018 Taichung mayoral election, in which she defeated incumbent Lin Chia-lung.

2018 Kuomintang Taichung City mayoral primary results
Candidates	Place	Results
Lu Shiow-yen	Nominated	50.308%
Johnny Chiang	2nd	49.692%

2018 Taichung City mayoral results
No.	Candidate	Party	Votes	Percentage
1	Song Yuan-tong (宋原通)	Independent	15,919	1.09%
2	Lin Chia-lung	Democratic Progressive Party	619,855	42.35%
3	Lu Shiow-yen	Kuomintang	827,996	56.57%
Total voters			2,213,789	
Valid votes			1,463,770	
Invalid votes				
Voter turnout			66.12%	

Political offices
Preceded by Lin Chia-lung	Mayor of Taichung; 2018–present	Incumbent
