= Chuang Ching-cheng =

Taiwanese biomedical engineer and politician (born 1980)

- 莊競程
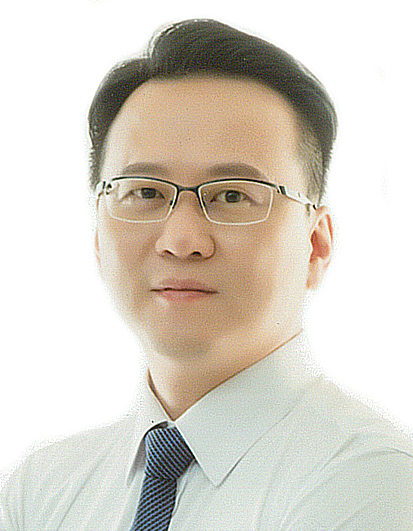

Member of the Legislative Yuan
- In office February 1, 2020 – January 31, 2024
- Constituency: Taichung 5

Personal details
- Born: December 22, 1980 (age 45) Taichung, Taiwan
- Party: Democratic Progressive Party
- Education: Chung Yuan Christian University (BS, MS); National Taiwan University (PhD)

Chuang Ching-cheng (Chinese: 莊競程; born December 22, 1980) is a Taiwanese biomedical engineer and politician who served as a member of the Legislative Yuan from 2020 to 2024 representing Taichung's 5th electoral district.

== Early life and education ==
Chuang was born in Taichung, Taiwan, on December 22, 1984. His uncle, Tseng Chao-jung, is also a politician. After high school, Chuang graduated from Chung Yuan Christian University with a Bachelor of Science (B.S.) and Master of Science (M.S.) in biomedical engineering. He then earned his Ph.D. in biomedical engineering from National Taiwan University in 2012. His doctoral dissertation was titled, "Research and development of near-infrared light diffusion optical brain contrast technology" (近紅外光擴散光學腦造影技術研發).

== Academic career ==
After receiving his doctorate, Chuang completed postdoctoral research at National Yang-Ming University in photonics and biomedical imaging from 2012 to 2014, and also was a postdoctoral fellow in biophotonics and molecular imaging at the university from 2012 to 2013 and a university fellow in dentistry from 2013 to 2014.

After spending time as a visiting scholar in computational optics and applied physics at the University of Tsukuba in Japan, he became an assistant professor in two departments at National Chiao Tung University: electrical engineering and computer engineering, and biomedical engineering.

== Political career ==
On September 4, 2019, Chuang was nominated by the Democratic Progressive Party (DPP) to run as a legislator representing the fifth electoral district of Taichung City. He was elected after defeating Kuomintang (KMT) legislator Shen Chih-hui, and took office on February 1, 2020.

In 2023, Chuang was nominated by the Democratic Progressive Party to run for re-election in the 2024 Taiwanese legislative election. However, he lost to Huang Chien-hao, a new member of the Kuomintang. After his defeat, Chuang was appointed as the executive director of the Executive Yuan's Central Taiwan Joint Services Center under premier Cho Jung-tai; he took office on May 20, 2024. However, he resigned on July 8, 2025, due to budget cuts to the center.

On October 1, 2025, Chuang became the chief executive officer (CEO) of the Taiwan Think Tank, a public policy think tank foundation.
