= Huang Chih-ta =

Taiwanese politician

- 黃致達
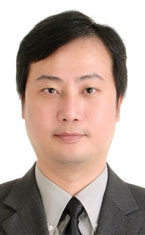

Minister without Portfolio
- Incumbent
- Assumed office 20 May 2020
- Premier: Su Tseng-chang; Chen Chien-jen

Personal details
- Born: 28 February 1972 (age 54)
- Party: Democratic Progressive Party
- Education: National Chengchi University (BA); Tamkang University (MA)

Huang Chih-ta (Chinese: 黃致達; pinyin: Huáng Zhìdá; born 28 February 1972) is a Taiwanese politician.

== Early life and family ==
Huang Chi-ta's maternal grandfather Lin Tsai-ling was a banker in Yilan County who was killed during the aftermath of 228 incident, as National Revolutionary Army personnel landed in Yilan. Huang was born on 28 February 1972, the 25th anniversary of the 228 incident. Huang Chi-ta earned bachelor's degree from National Chengchi University, followed by a master's degree from Tamkang University.

== Political career ==
Huang was deputy director of the Democratic Progressive Party's Department of International Affairs. During Su Tseng-chang's tenure as chairman of the Democratic Progressive Party from 2012 to 2014, Huang was a deputy leader of the party's Central Committee. He then joined Su's Eball Foundation. Within the Lin Chuan cabinet, Huang worked for vice premier Lin Hsi-yao. While William Lai held the premiership, Huang served as Lai's office director. He left the position to aid the 2018 New Taipei mayoral campaign of Su Tseng-chang. After Su's loss in the mayoral election, he replaced Lai as premier, and retained Huang as office director. Upon the second inauguration of President Tsai Ing-wen in 2020, Huang was appointed a minister without portfolio.
