= Zhou Yongjun =

Chinese democracy movement leader

Zhou Yongjun (周勇军) is a Chinese former political activist. He was a student activist who was elected chair of the Beijing Students' Autonomous Federation during the 1989 Tiananmen Square protests and massacre.

Zhou Yongjun became one of the more prominent student leaders during the Tiananmen Square protests. After the protests were crushed on 4 June 1989, the authorities arrested and imprisoned him for two years. In 1992, he fled China to Hong Kong and later the United States, where he became a permanent resident.

The Chinese government arrested and imprisoned Zhou at least four times: from 1989-1991, 1998-2001, and 2008-2017, and 2018-2019. Zhou first sought to re-enter China in 1998 but he was arrested and sentenced to three years in a re-education-through-labour camp. In 2008, Zhou was detained and imprisoned by the Chinese government when the Hong Kong government handed him over to the mainland Chinese, which became the Zhou Yongjun incident. He was sentenced to nine years imprisonment for entering China on a false passport. After his release, Zhou was arrested again in 2018 and sentenced to thirteen months of prison for picking quarrels and provoking trouble. Zhou announced his retirement from politics after being released in 2019.

== Biography ==
=== Tiananmen Square protests and massacre ===
Zhou was a student at the China University of Political Science and Law (CUPL) at the time of the student protests and ensuing military crackdown on 4 June 1989.

During the protests, Zhou, along with Guo Haifeng, and Zhang Zhiyong, knelt on the steps of the Great Hall of the People to present a petition and demanded to see Premier Li Peng. (Note: Analyst Richard Baum described their actions as "...a mock-ceremonial remonstrance... presenting their scrolled-up demands on hands and knees in the stylized, obsequious manner of an imperial petition." Political scientist Lucian Pye similarly described the act as "...in line with the classic Chinese tradition of aggrieved parties wailing before the Yamen door, of publicly dramatizing their unhappiness by petitioning officialdom... [they] sincerely believed that the officials would have to respond by meeting with them.") Standing beside them, a fourth student (Wu'erkaixi) made a brief, emotional speech begging for Li Peng to come out and speak with them. The larger number of students still in the square but outside the cordon were at times emotional, shouting demands or slogans and rushing toward police. Wu'er Kaixi calmed the crowd as they waited for the Premier to emerge. However, no leaders emerged from the Great Hall, leaving the students disappointed and angry; some called for a classroom boycott.

On 21 April, students began organizing under the banners of formal groups. On 22 April 1989, Zhou Yongjun was among a group of protesting students photographed kneeling in front of the Great Hall to present a list of demands to China's leaders after the death of Hu Yaobang.

==== Presidency of the Beijing Students' Autonomous Federation ====
On 23 April, in a meeting of about 40 students from 21 universities, the Beijing Students' Autonomous Federation (also known as the Union) was formed. According to Eddie Cheng, at a hastily convened meeting to form the Beijing Students Autonomous Federation and elect its leader, Zhou Yongjun of the University of Political Science and Law narrowly defeated Wu'er Kaixi to be its first president. During this time, Wang Dan also emerged as a student leader. The Union then called for a general classroom boycott at all Beijing universities. An independent union of individuals operating outside of party jurisdiction alarmed the leadership.

=== First arrest and imprisonment (1989-1991) ===
Zhou was arrested and held for two years in prison for his role in the protests. He subsequently lost his enrollment status as a student as well as his family registration as a Beijing resident. In 1992, Zhou fled to Hong Kong and then traveled to the United States, where he was granted resident's status.

=== Second arrest and imprisonment (1998-2001) ===
Zhou first attempted to re-enter China was in 1998, but he was caught and sentenced to three years of administrative detention in a re-education-through-labour camp. After his release, he again left in 2002 for the United States.

=== Third arrest and imprisonment (2008-2017) ===
Zhou made a second attempt to reenter mainland China on 28 September 2008, but he was intercepted by immigration department officials at the Hong Kong Macau Ferry Terminal, on suspicion of entering Hong Kong using a counterfeited travel document. He had travelled from the United States to Macao, using a Malaysian passport purchased from a travel agent in Los Angeles. The passport was in the name of Wang Xingxiang, a known alias of Zhong Gong leader Zhang Hongbao. He had repeatedly been denied requests for an official permit to return to China by the Chinese authorities. Zhou was on his way to Sichuan to visit his ailing father. Zhou was documented in Sichuan saying he was detained on arrival in Hong Kong and then secretly handed over to Shenzhen authorities two days later. Lawyer Li Jinjin said Zhou was initially held at the No.1 Detention Center in the southern city of Shenzhen, and later transferred to the Shenzhen Yantian Detention Center. In May 2009, seven months after his arrest, Zhou's family was notified that he had been detained by Sichuan authorities on fraud charges. The indictment by prosecutors in Shehong county stated Zhou used the alias of Wang Xingxiang, and attempted to transfer money from an account at Hang Seng Bank in Hong Kong to two banks, in the city and in Australia.

His lawyer, pan-democrat legislator Albert Ho, held a press conference on 12 October 2009 during which he said his client was picked up by immigration officers, put into a van and driven across the border to mainland China against his will. Ho said that normal protocol would be to send him back to his place of origin, which in this case would be Macau or the United States. Furthermore, Ho noted that there was no agreement with the mainland on extradition, and demanded that the Hong Kong government explain why Zhou was handed over to Shenzhen authorities; he appealed to Chief Executive Donald Tsang to make available police records of the incident and to press for Zhou's release. The Hong Kong Government, speaking only in general terms, said in an official statement that "a passenger whose travel document does not meet the entry requirements will be repatriated to his or her place of embarkation or origin."

Zhou was tried in Shehong, and was sentenced to nine years in jail for a fraud attempted in Hong Kong. The Times remarked that "details of the charges against Zhou are vague, as is common in China's opaque legal system." Wang Xingxiang, the name in Zhou's bogus passport, was placed on a money laundering watch list following a complaint by the Hang Seng Bank received a suspicious request to transfer HK$6 million out of an account registered in that name. The transfer was not completed as the signature on the transfer form did not match that of the account signatory.

After Zhou was sentenced, Secretary for Security, Ambrose Lee, rejected accusations the government knowingly turned Zhou over to the mainland authorities. On the other hand, he also denied there had been any serious errors in the Hong Kong Government's handling of the incident. A South China Morning Post article on this goes on to state that "However, a person with direct knowledge of the case said immigration officers did not know Zhou's real identity when they repatriated him and that Zhou did not state that he had residency in another country when officers told him that he would be sent to the mainland."

An editorial in the South China Morning Post on 6 February 2010 said the Chinese government action appeared to be extra-territorial. It criticized the Hong Kong government for hiding behind bland statements, and urged it to defend the principle of 'One country, two systems'.

=== Fourth arrest and imprisonment (2018-2019) ===
After his release, Zhou was arrested again in 2018 under a vaguely-worded Chinese law. After his release, he announced he was too old to continue being involved in politics.
