= Zhou Yongjun incident =

2008–10 Hong Kong legal and political event

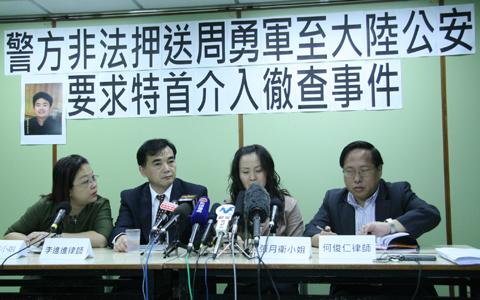
Albert Ho (right) and Zhou's family held a press conference in Hong Kong on October 12, 2009

The Zhou Yongjun incident was a political controversy which involved the rendition of Zhou Yongjun (周勇军), a former student activist during the 1989 Tiananmen Square protests and massacre, by the Hong Kong authorities to the People's Republic of China. Zhou attempted to enter Hong Kong from the United States via Macau using a forged Malaysian passport. Zhou's supporters alleged the renditioning to be illegal, and his lawyer, Democratic Party chairman Albert Ho, described Zhou's case as "posing the biggest challenge to the one country, two systems principle laid down in the Basic Law." The Government of Hong Kong refused to comment on individual cases, and the People's Republic of China said Zhou was detained on several charges, including one of financial fraud.

== Background on Zhou ==
Zhou was a student at the China University of Political Science and Law at the time of the student protests and ensuing military crackdown on 4 June 1989. He was among a group of students who were photographed kneeling in front of the Great Hall of the People on 22 April that year to present a list of demands to China's leaders after the death of Hu Yaobang.

Zhou was arrested and held for two years in prison for his role in the protests. He subsequently lost his enrollment status as a student as well as his family registration as a Beijing resident. In 1992, Zhou fled to Hong Kong and then traveled to the United States, where he was granted resident's status. His first attempt to re-enter China was in 1998, but he was caught and sentenced to three years of administrative detention in a re-education-through-labour camp. After his release, he again left in 2002 for the United States.

== The incident ==
=== Illegal entry into Hong Kong ===
Zhou made a second attempt to reenter mainland China on 28 September 2008, but he was intercepted by immigration department officials at the Hong Kong Macau Ferry Terminal, on suspicion of entering Hong Kong using a counterfeited travel document. He had travelled from the United States to Macao, using a Malaysian passport purchased from a travel agent in Los Angeles. The passport was in the name of Wang Xingxiang, a known alias of Zhong Gong leader Zhang Hongbao. He had repeatedly been denied requests for an official permit to return to China by the Chinese authorities. Zhou was on his way to Sichuan to visit his ailing father. Zhou was documented in Sichuan saying he was detained on arrival in Hong Kong and then secretly handed over to Shenzhen authorities two days later. Lawyer Li Jinjin said Zhou was initially held at the No.1 Detention Center in the southern city of Shenzhen, and later transferred to the Shenzhen Yantian Detention Center. In May 2009, seven months after his arrest, Zhou's family was notified that he had been detained by Sichuan authorities on fraud charges. The indictment by prosecutors in Shehong county stated Zhou used the alias of Wang Xingxiang, and attempted to transfer money from an account at Hang Seng Bank in Hong Kong to two banks, in the city and in Australia.

His lawyer, pan-democrat legislator Albert Ho, held a press conference on 12 October 2009 during which he said his client was picked up by immigration officers, put into a van and driven across the border to mainland China against his will. Ho said that normal protocol would be to send him back to his place of origin, which in this case would be Macau or the United States. Furthermore, Ho noted that there was no agreement with the mainland on extradition, and demanded that the Hong Kong government explain why Zhou was handed over to Shenzhen authorities; he appealed to Chief Executive Donald Tsang to make available police records of the incident and to press for Zhou's release. The Hong Kong Government, speaking only in general terms, said in an official statement that "a passenger whose travel document does not meet the entry requirements will be repatriated to his or her place of embarkation or origin."

=== The trial ===
Zhou was tried in Shehong, and was sentenced to nine years in jail for a fraud attempted in Hong Kong. The Times remarked that "details of the charges against Zhou are vague, as is common in China’s opaque legal system." Wang Xingxiang, the name in Zhou's bogus passport, was placed on a money laundering watch list following a complaint by the Hang Seng Bank received a suspicious request to transfer HK$6 million out of an account registered in that name. The transfer was not completed as the signature on the transfer form did not match that of the account signatory.

After Zhou was sentenced, Secretary for Security, Ambrose Lee, rejected accusations the government knowingly turned Zhou over to the mainland authorities. On the other hand, he also denied there had been any serious errors in the Hong Kong Government's handling of the incident. A South China Morning Post article on this goes on to state that "However, a person with direct knowledge of the case said immigration officers did not know Zhou's real identity when they repatriated him and that Zhou did not state that he had residency in another country when officers told him that he would be sent to the mainland."

An editorial in the South China Morning Post on 6 February 2010 said the Chinese government action appeared to be extra-territorial. It criticized the Hong Kong government for hiding behind bland statements, and urged it to defend the principle of 'One country, two systems'
