= Beijing Students' Autonomous Federation =

Student union involved in the Tiananmen Square protests

- 北京高校学生自治联合会
- Founded: 23 April 1989; 37 years ago
- Founder: Liu Gang
- Headquarters: Yuanmingyuan, Beijing
- Leader: Zhou Yongjun

The Beijing Students' Autonomous Federation, also translated as Beijing Students' Autonomous Union (Chinese: 北京高校学生自治联合会; pinyin: Běijīng gāoxiào xuéshēng zìzhì liánhé huì) was a self-governing student union representing multiple Beijing universities, and acting as the student protesters' principal decision-making body during the 1989 Tiananmen Square protests. Student protesters founded the Federation in opposition to the official, government-supported student organizations, which they believed were undemocratic. Although the Federation made several demands of the government during the protests and organized multiple demonstrations in the Square, its primary focus was to obtain government recognition as a legitimate organization. By seeking this recognition, the Federation directly challenged the Chinese Communist Party's authority. After failing to achieve direct dialogue with the government, the Federation lost support from student protesters, and its central leadership role within the Tiananmen Square protests.

== Origin ==
After former General Secretary of the Chinese Communist Party Hu Yaobang's death on April 15, students mobilized spontaneously both to mourn Hu's passing and to demand democratic reform in China. On April 19, at Peking University (Beida), a meeting was anonymously organized to discuss the ongoing protests in the Square, as well as the prospect of forming an autonomous student organization. The meeting, in essence, was a "democracy salon"—an unofficial student discussion group that students at Beida had founded by the former Beida physics graduate student Liu Gang months before Hu Yaobang's death. The salon decided that an autonomous organization was necessary to coordinate student protesters on multiple Beijing campuses. However, for fear of punishment by the government, few at the meeting were willing to speak out. Those who did, including history student Wang Dan, became the leaders of the newly formed Beijing Students' Autonomous Federation.

Another aim of the new Federation was the rejection of the official student organizations. According to one student announcement, "the leadership of the original union is inept, has sold out the students' interests…and is completely unable to represent the students' wishes." In this way, the student protesters saw the Federation as representing the wishes of the entire student body. The Federation planned to seek legitimacy by strict observance of democratic policies such as elections and group decision-making. The students hoped these methods would ensure the organization's unity of leadership, and would effectively contrast with the lack of transparency they perceived in the Communist Party. On May 23, the Beijing Students' Autonomous Federation established officially at Liu Gang's residence near Yuanmingyuan, during the first meeting, the students had elected Zhou Yongjun as the first chairman of the Beijing Students' Autonomous Federation.

On April 26, People's Daily published the editorial "It is Necessary to Take a Clear-Cut Stand Against Turmoil", attributing the protests to "a small minority" attempting to "poison people's minds" and "create national turmoil." On the same day, the Beijing Students' Autonomous Federation was officially established. At their meeting, around 2,000 students elected a seven-person committee to lead the Federation. Concerned by the April 26 editorial, the Federation decided that, as an illegal organization, it needed to reinforce its legitimacy by showing its popular support. To achieve this goal, the Federation organized a demonstration to take place on April 27.

== Creation, leadership election, and boycott ==
Beijing Students' Autonomous Union leaders
Name	Birthplace and University
Zhou Yongjun	China University of Political Science and Law
Wu'er Kaixi	Beijing; Beijing Normal University
Liu Gang	Jilin; Peking University
Wang Dan	Beijing; Peking University
Chai Ling	Shandong; Beijing Normal University
Zhou Fengsuo	Shaanxi; Tsinghua University
Feng Congde	Sichuan; Peking University
Shen Tong	Beijing; Peking University
Wang Youcai	Zhejiang; Peking University

On 23 April, in a meeting of about 40 students from 21 universities, the Beijing Students' Autonomous Federation, also known as the Union, was formed. According to Eddie Cheng, at a hastily convened meeting to form the group and elect its leader, Zhou Yongjun of the University of Political Science and Law narrowly defeated Wu'er Kaixi to be its first president. The Union then called for a general classroom boycott at all Beijing universities. An independent union of individuals operating outside of party jurisdiction alarmed the Chinese Communist Party leadership.

== Dialogue and recognition ==
Between April 16 and 26, the government had dismissed the autonomous students' demands for recognition and dialogue. The government, unwilling to accept the legitimacy of the independent student unions, had attempted instead to arrange talks with individual student leaders. Although the student protesters believed they were acting patriotically and morally, the Communist leadership saw the students' demands as a threat to political and social order. As a result, the students had difficulty obtaining their goal of direct dialogue with the government.

After the April 27 demonstrations, the government held its first dialogue with the Federation leaders on April 29. However, the government avoided direct contact with the Federation, instead inviting student leaders to meet on an individual basis. While some students saw the government's offer as a victory, others felt that they should only attend the dialogue as recognized representatives of the Federation. Wuer Kaixi, a Federation leader, attended the dialogue as a "private individual", but decided to leave midway through to protest the government's lack of recognition of the Federation. Dissatisfied with the dialogue, Wuer Kaixi later described it as a "trick of the government to destroy the student solidarity." During the meeting, State Council spokesman Yuan Mu insisted that the Communist Party and the student protesters shared the same goals.

On May 1, the Federation rejected the legitimacy of the April 29 dialogue in a news conference. The following day, the Federation presented a twelve-point petition, including a demand that future government efforts at dialogue be sincere. Although the government rejected this petition, the petition represented a compromise on the students' part, as Amnesty International researcher Corinna-Barbara Francis suggests. That is, instead of demanding explicit government recognition, the students only asked for dialogue "on the basis of full equality between the two parties." By May 29, the students' demands were reduced to two: denunciation of the April 26 editorial by the government and acknowledgement of the federation's democratic nature.

== Division and decline ==
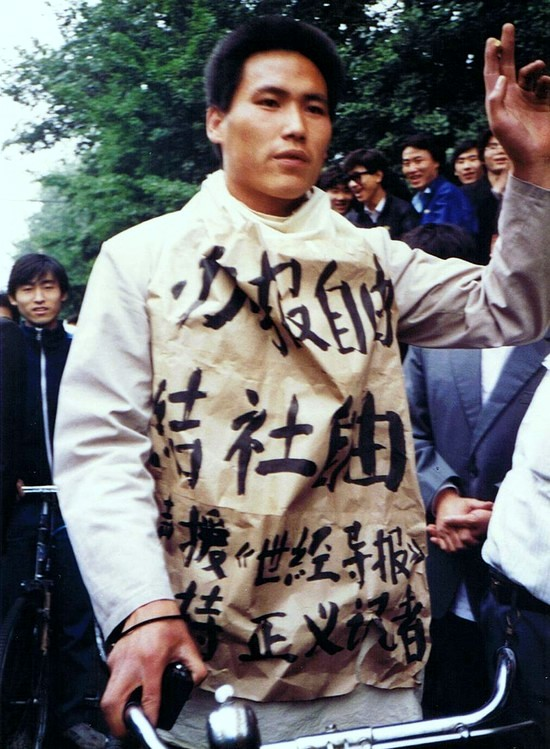
A photo of Pu Zhiqiang, a student protester at Tiananmen, taken on 10 May 1989.

On May 4, the Federation successfully organized a demonstration of over 100,000 protesters in Tiananmen Square, marking the 70-year anniversary of the May Fourth Movement. Also on May 4, the Federation decided to end the boycott on class attendance it had begun on April 24. This sudden and unexpected end to the boycott, and loss of momentum in student-government negotiations, resulted in a loss of student enthusiasm for the protests. As student leader Chai Ling noted "the movement dwindled to a low point as more and more students returned to classes." In an attempt to reinvigorate the movement, Chai Ling and other students started a hunger strike on the Square. Although the Federation initially opposed the hunger strikers during its May 12 meeting, it eventually decided to support individual strikers, but avoided official endorsement of the Hunger Strike Group. As the protests continued throughout May and into June, the Hunger Strike Group would take control of events in the Square, and would largely displace the authority previously held by the Beijing Students' Autonomous Federation.

== Government response ==
Speaking with CCP General Secretary Zhao Ziyang on May 4, Premier Li Peng voiced his concern over the ongoing protests in the Square. While Zhao Ziyang contended that the April 26 editorial had encouraged student protesters, Li Peng contended that this was too simple an explanation for the growth of the protest movement, suggesting that the April 26 editorial "did not accuse the vast majority of students of creating turmoil." Li Peng also opposed to the student protester's demands for negotiation. Voicing concern over the rising prominence of the "illegal student organizations," Li objected to the Federation's desire "to negotiate with the Party and government as equals" and saw the students' twelve-point petition as a "threat." In his conversation with Zhao, Li also asserted that the Federation's primary goal was to "negate the leadership of the CCP and negate the entire socialist system."

On May 13, after the hunger strikers announced their plan, Yan Mingfu, Director of the Party's United Front Work Department, met with a number of intellectuals and student protesters, including Wang Dan, Chai Ling, and Wuer Kaixi. At the meeting, Yan Mingfu suggested that if the student protesters stopped their hunger strike and instead submitted their "demands and suggestions through proper channels," he could assure them that "the door to dialogue" would remain open. However, when he later briefed Zhao Ziyang on the meeting, Yan Mingfu shared his unease at the divisions he observed among the student protesters: "the AFS [the Federation], the Dialogue Delegation, and representatives of the hunger strikers…are in disagreement among themselves…I'm not sure any of them truly represents the hunger strikers or can exert any influence on them."

== See also ==
- Funding of student organizations during the 1989 Tiananmen Square protests and massacre

== Sources Cited ==
- Calhoun, Craig J. 1994. Neither Gods Nor Emperors: Students and the Struggle for Democracy in China. University of California Press.
- Francis, Corinna-Barbara. 1989. "The Progress of Protest in China: The Spring of 1989." Asian Survey 29 (9): 898–915. doi:10.2307/2644834.
- King, Sarah Sanderson, and Donald P. Cushman. 1992. Political Communication: Engineering Visions of Order in the Socialist World. SUNY Press.
- Li, Peter, Marjorie H. Li, and Steven Mark. 2009. Culture and Politics in China: An Anatomy of Tiananmen Square. Transaction Publishers.
- Saich, Tony. 1990. "The Rise and Fall of the Beijing People's Movement." The Australian Journal of Chinese Affairs, no. 24 (July): 181–208. doi:10.2307/2158894.
- Wright, Teresa. 1999. "State Repression and Student Protest in Contemporary China." The China Quarterly 157: 142–72. doi:10.1017/S0305741000040236.
- Zhang, Liang, Andrew J Nathan, and E. Perry Link. 2002. The Tiananmen Papers. New York: PublicAffairs.
- Zhao, Dingxin (2001). The Power of Tiananmen: State-Society Relations and the 1989 Beijing Student Movement. University of Chicago Press.
