= Hsieh Ming-yuan =

Taiwanese politician (born 1952)

- 謝明源
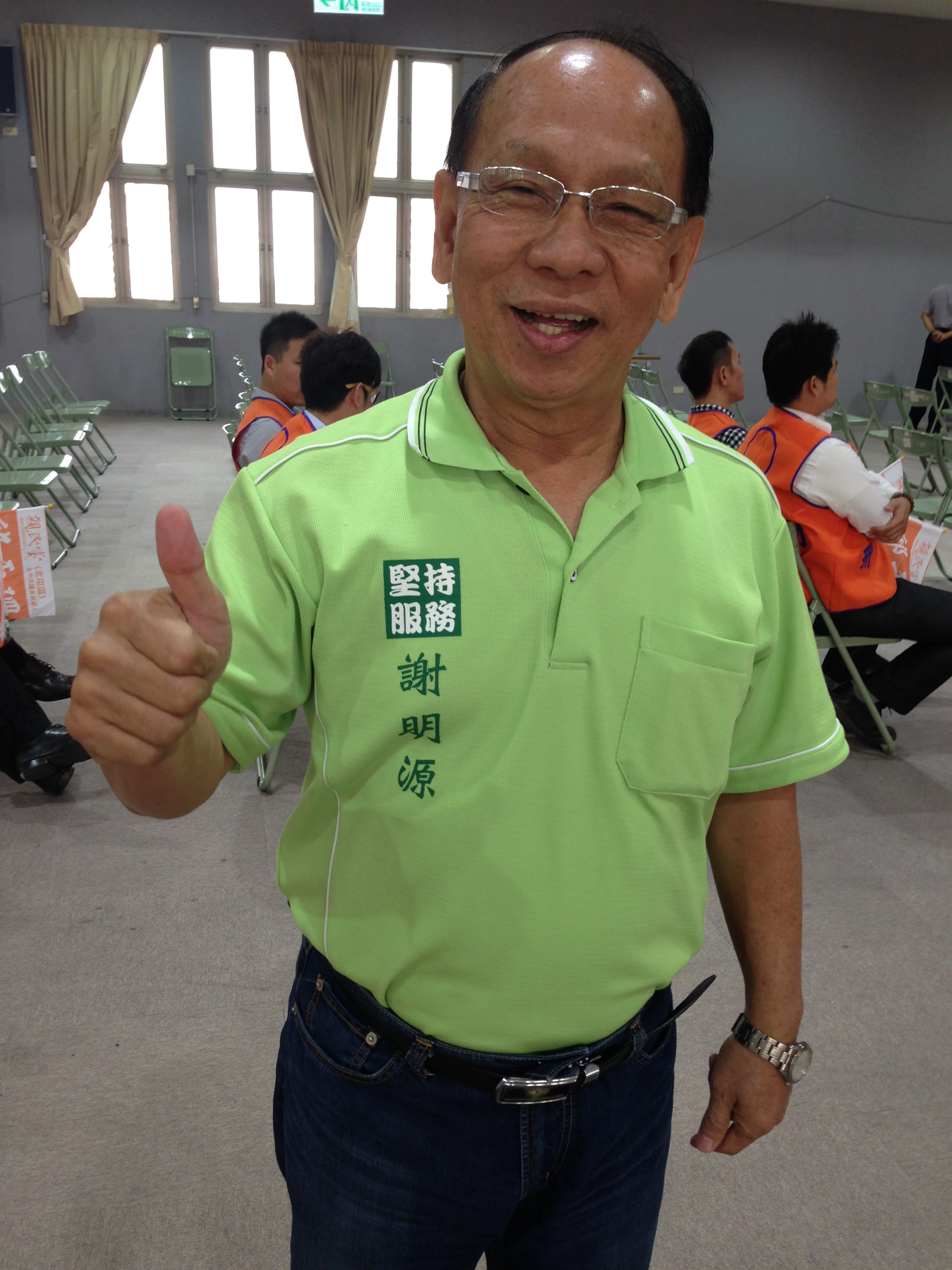

Member of the Taichung City Council
- In office 25 December 2014 – 24 December 2022
- In office 1 March 1994 – 31 January 2002

Member of the Legislative Yuan
- In office 1 February 2002 – 31 January 2008
- Constituency: Taichung

Personal details
- Born: 3 September 1952 (age 73) Kaohsiung, Taiwan
- Party: Democratic Progressive Party
- Education: National Chung Hsing University (BA)

Hsieh Ming-yuan (Chinese: 謝明源; pinyin: Xiè Míngyuán; born 3 September 1952) is a Taiwanese politician.

== Education ==
Hsieh graduated from National Chung Hsing University with a degree in business.

== Political career ==
Hsieh led the Taichung chapter of the Democratic Progressive Party and served two terms on the Taichung City Council from 1994 to 2002. He helped run the legislative campaigns of Michael Tsai and led presidential candidate Chen Shui-bian's Taichung campaign in 2000. Hsieh was elected to the Legislative Yuan for the first time in December 2001 and reelected in December 2004. He lost reelection in 2008 and later ended his 2009 Taichung mayoral campaign, allowing Lin Chia-lung to represent the Democratic Progressive Party. Hsieh launched another legislative campaign in 2012 before winning a Taichung municipal election in 2014.
