= Mayor of Taichung =

Mayor of the City of Taichung
- Seal of Taichung

- Flag of Taichung

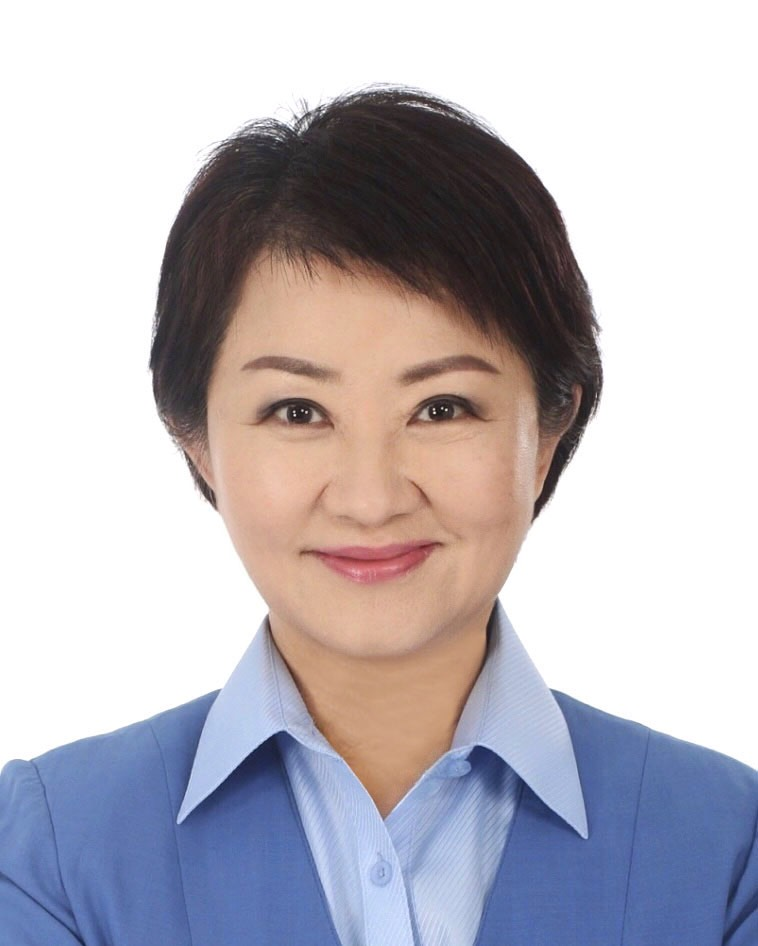
- Incumbent; Lu Shiow-yen since 25 December 2018
- Term length: four years; may serve 1 consecutive terms
- Website: www.taichung.gov.tw

The Mayor of Taichung is the head of the Taichung City Government, Taiwan and is elected to a four-year term. The current mayor is Lu Shiow-yen of the Kuomintang since 25 December 2018.

== Titles of the Mayor ==
Date	English	Characters	Japanese	Mandarin	Taiwanese	Hakka
Oct 1920–Oct 1940	Mayor of Taichū	臺中市市尹	Taichū-shi Shiin		Tâi-tiong-chhī Chhī-ún	Thòi-chûng-sṳ Sṳ-yún
Oct 1940–Oct 1945	Mayor of Taichū	臺中市市長	Taichū-shi Shichō		Tâi-tiong-chhī; Chhī-tiúⁿ	Thòi-chûng-sṳ; Sṳ-chhòng
Oct 1945–present	Mayor of Taichung	臺中市市長		Táizhōng Shì Shìzhǎng	Tâi-tiong-chhī; Chhī-tiúⁿ	Thòi-chûng-sṳ; Sṳ-chhòng

== List of mayors ==
This list includes only those persons who served as mayors of Taichung after the end of World War II, during the Post-War era of Taiwan. The first two mayors served were appointed by the central government of Taiwan.

Independent Kuomintang Chinese Youth Party Democratic Progressive Party

=== Mayor of Taichung (Provincial city, directly-elected) ===
No.	Portrait	Name (Birth–Death)	Term of office		Political party	Term
5		Yang Chi-hsien 楊基先; Yáng Jīxiān (Mandarin); Yòng Kî-siên (Hakka) (1903–1961)	1 February 1951	2 June 1954	Independent	1
6		Lin Chin-piao 林金標; Lín Jīnbiāo (Mandarin); Lìm Kîm-pêu (Hakka) (?–?)	2 June 1954	2 June 1957	Kuomintang	2
6		Lin Chin-piao 林金標; Lín Jīnbiāo (Mandarin); Lìm Kîm-pêu (Hakka) (?–?)	2 June 1957	2 June 1960	Kuomintang	3
7		Chiou Chin-chou 邱欽洲; Qiū Qīnzhōu (Mandarin); Hiû Khîm-chû (Hakka) (?–?)	2 June 1960	2 June 1964	Kuomintang	4
8		Chang Chi-chung 張啟仲; Zhāng Qǐzhòng (Mandarin); Chông Khí-chhung (Hakka) (1916–2009)	2 June 1964	6 December 1966	Kuomintang	5
––		Luo Li-ju 羅立儒; Luó Lìrú (Mandarin); Lò Li̍p-yì (Hakka) (?–?)	6 December 1966	1 September 1967	Kuomintang	5
8		Chang Chi-chung 張啟仲; Zhāng Qǐzhòng (Mandarin); Chông Khí-chhung (Hakka) (1916–2009)	1 September 1967	18 December 1967	Kuomintang	5
–-		Luo Li-ju 羅立儒; Luó Lìrú (Mandarin); Lò Li̍p-yì (Hakka) (?–?)	18 December 1967	2 June 1968	Kuomintang	5
9		Lin Cheng-chiou 林澄秋; Lín Chéngqiū (Mandarin); Lìm Chhṳ̀n-chhiû (Hakka) (?–1979)	2 June 1968	1 February 1973	Independent	6
10		Chen Tuan-tang 陳端堂; Chén Duāntáng (Mandarin); Chhṳ̀n Tôn-thòng (Hakka) (1920–2005)	1 February 1973	20 December 1977	Kuomintang	7
		Chen Tuan-tang 陳端堂; Chén Duāntáng (Mandarin); Chhṳ̀n Tôn-thòng (Hakka) (1920–2005)	1 February 1973	20 December 1977	Independent	7
11		Tzeng Wen-po 曾文坡; Zēng Wénpō (Mandarin); Chên Vùn-pô (Hakka) (1935–2002)	20 December 1977	20 December 1981	Independent	8
		Tzeng Wen-po 曾文坡; Zēng Wénpō (Mandarin); Chên Vùn-pô (Hakka) (1935–2002)	20 December 1977	20 December 1981	Chinese Youth Party	8
12		Lin Po-jung 林柏榕; Lín Bóróng (Mandarin); Lìm Pak-yùng (Hakka) (1936–)	20 December 1981	20 December 1985	Kuomintang	9
13		Chang Tzu-yuan 張子源; Zhãng Zǐyuán (Mandarin); Chông Chṳ́-ngièn (Hakka) (1942–2010)	20 December 1985	20 July 1989	Kuomintang	10
––		Hwang Ching-fong 黃鏡峰; Huáng Jìngfēng (Mandarin); Vòng Kiang-fûng (Hakka) (1930–2012)	20 July 1989	20 December 1989	Kuomintang	10
14		Lin Po-jung 林柏榕; Lín Bóróng (Mandarin); Lìm Pak-yùng (Hakka) (1936–)	20 December 1989	20 December 1993	Kuomintang	11
14		Lin Po-jung 林柏榕; Lín Bóróng (Mandarin); Lìm Pak-yùng (Hakka) (1936–)	20 December 1993	4 October 1995	Kuomintang	12
––		Chen Cheng-hsiung 陳正雄; Chén Zhèngxióng (Mandarin); Chhṳ̀n Chang-hiùng (Hakka) (?–?)	4 October 1995	3 April 1996	Kuomintang	12
14		Lin Po-jung 林柏榕; Lín Bóróng (Mandarin); Lìm Pak-yùng (Hakka) (1936–)	3 April 1996	3 June 1996	Kuomintang	12
–-		Lin Hsueh-cheng 林學正; Lín Xuézhèng (Mandarin); Lìm Ho̍k-chang (Hakka) (?–?)	3 June 1996	29 July 1997	Kuomintang	12
14		Lin Po-jung 林柏榕; Lín Bóróng (Mandarin); Lìm Pak-yùng (Hakka) (1936–)	29 July 1997	20 December 1997	Kuomintang	12
15		Chang Wen-ying 張溫鷹; Zhāng Wēnyīng (Mandarin); Chông Vûn-Ên (Hakka) (1950–)	20 December 1997	20 December 2001	Democratic Progressive Party	13
		Chang Wen-ying 張溫鷹; Zhāng Wēnyīng (Mandarin); Chông Vûn-Ên (Hakka) (1950–)	20 December 1997	20 December 2001	Independent	13
16		Jason Hu 胡志強; Hú Zhìqiáng (Mandarin); Fù Chṳ-khiòng (Hakka) (1948–)	20 December 2001	20 December 2005	Kuomintang	14
16		Jason Hu 胡志強; Hú Zhìqiáng (Mandarin); Fù Chṳ-khiòng (Hakka) (1948–)	20 December 2005	25 December 2010	Kuomintang	15

=== Mayor of Taichung (Special municipality) ===
No.	Portrait	Name (Birth–Death)	Term of office		Political party	Term
1		Jason Hu 胡志強; Hú Zhìqiáng (Mandarin); Fù Chṳ-khiòng (Hakka) (1948–)	25 December 2010	25 December 2014	Kuomintang	1
2		Lin Chia-lung 林佳龍; Lín Jialóng (Mandarin); Lìm Kâ-liùng (Hakka) (1964–)	25 December 2014	25 December 2018	Democratic Progressive Party	2
3		Lu Shiow-yen 盧秀燕; Lú Xiùyàn (Mandarin); Lù Siu-yen (Hakka) (1961–)	25 December 2018	25 December 2022	Kuomintang	3
3		Lu Shiow-yen 盧秀燕; Lú Xiùyàn (Mandarin); Lù Siu-yen (Hakka) (1961–)	25 December 2022	Incumbent	Kuomintang	4
