= April 27 demonstrations =

1989 nationwide Chinese student protests in response to the April 26 Editorial

The April 27 demonstrations were massive student protest marches throughout major cities in China during the 1989 Tiananmen Square protests. The students were protesting in response to the April 26 Editorial published by the People's Daily the previous day. The editorial asserted that the student movement was anti-party and contributed to a sense of chaos and destabilization. The content of the editorial incited the largest student protest of the movement thus far in Beijing: 50,000–200,000 students marched through the streets of Beijing before finally breaking through police lines into Tiananmen Square.

== Events ==
After the editorial was published, the students at Peking University in Beijing met during the night to discuss their plans for a march on April 27. Some of the authorities in the school tried to coax the students into calling it off; they gave hints that if the students did not protest, then the school officials would use their government connections to begin dialogues. But the students were too upset to stand down, and their enthusiasm to march could not be quelled. They compromised: they would only march part of the way, up to the Third Ring Road, but not all the way to Tiananmen Square itself. One scholar observed that the students thought it would show that they "rejected the April 26 editorial but would not constitute a major provocation," because the students were still scared of the government using retaliatory force.

=== Locations ===
Although students had demonstrated before, the April 27 demonstrations were particularly significant, because their scale was the largest instance of defying the state since 1949. Students were protesting across China: "not only in cities where demonstrations had already taken place, such as Shanghai, Tianjin, Changchun, Xi'an, Wuhan, Nanjing, Hangzhou, Hefei, Changsha, Chengdu, and Chongqing, but also in cities where demonstrations now broke out for the first time: Shenyang, Dalian, Shijiazhuang, Nanning, Kunming, Shenzhen, Yinchuan, and Guilin."

=== The Beijing demonstration ===
The Beijing demonstration was the largest, with one conservative estimate at 30,000 students marching, but most sources claim between 150,000 and 200,000 were present. It is difficult to ascertain the exact number of student protesters, however, because there were so many citizens from Beijing cheering them on and supporting them in solidarity. In the words of economist Chu-yuan Cheng, it was the first time that a "pro-democracy student protest campaign drew enthusiastic support from the masses." According to two Canadian journalists, the April 26 editorial had also "struck a raw nerve within the general populace" and the focus on themes like corruption and inflation stirred the people's sympathy. Many of students were carrying signs or banners, not advocating for overthrowing the CPC, which the April 26 editorial had accused them of, but rather focused on democracy and cracking down on corruption. According to Chai Ling, a student protester who would later become a leader of the Hunger Strike Group, the Beijing Students' Autonomous Federation had planned to stage a demonstration in the Square on April 27 even "before the government verdict appeared in the People's Daily."

=== Interaction between students and the state ===
Many officials were worried about the size and support of the demonstrations: Yang Shangkun, with Deng Xiaoping's permission, had five hundred troops of Beijing Military Region's Thirty-Eighth Army enter Beijing in case the demonstrations got out of hand. This was in addition to all the available Beijing police, which included students from the police academy. But thousands of workers surrounded the soldiers and cut them off from the students; some of the workers even cleared aside police barricades to let the students march onward. The students, marching for fourteen hours, gained more support as they went on, and Canadian journalist Scott Simmie estimated that half a million citizens participated in the demonstration.

Despite the presence of police and military, there was little-to-no violence or altercations between them and the students. Both sides were self-disciplined, and according to a few observing citizens, some of the students even shook officers' hands and chanted "the people's police love the people." The police did not resort to violence either; they temporarily slowed down the marchers before ultimately stepping aside and letting them pass. There was also little-to-no vandalism or trouble from the students in general: one Chinese bystander remarked that "even the vagabonds and thieves were on their good behaviour this time. No one wanted to stir up trouble." This only served to buoy the students' feelings of elation, and instead of abandoning the march at the Third Ring Road, as planned, their enthusiasm compelled them to continue all the way to Tiananmen Square.

== Aftermath ==
From the students' perspective, the April 27 demonstrations were a milestone in the student movement: they realized that they had the potential to make a difference. For the first time, the students were speaking for the people and workers; they did not focus solely on the interests of students and intellectuals. In one scholar's interpretation, the people were unable to protest and demonstrate, so the student demonstrations took on the "silent frustrations of the population." It was also the first case of when the students faced official resistance, such as police lines and a military presence, whom they interacted with peacefully. The government became more placatory and held dialogues with the students afterwards, which encouraged them to continue protesting. It served to revitalize the movement and inspired the students by showing that their actions had serious consequences. One big-character poster was put up on the next day at People's University, explaining the attitude of the students in the aftermath: "those of us who went through the experience agree: the march was a great victory in the process of democratization in China." This was the immediate sensation of many of the students involved, but their elation was short-lived. The talks with the government would not go well, and the threat of violence would loom over the dialogues. Some observers even claim that these protests were not free from violence. A foreign medical student saw that "three or four students were brought into intensive care that evening, badly beaten, one allegedly with a broken back." After news of this, another student said that "'blood will be shed…'where this would happen, or how soon it might come, he could not say, but he felt that it was coming." While violence may not have been inevitable, the events after the April 27 demonstrations did not reflect the students' triumphant attitude at the time.

== Sources ==
- Brook, Timothy. Quelling The People: The Military Suppression of the Beijing Democracy Movement. New York: Oxford University Press, 1992.
- Broadbent. Jeffrey, and Vicky Brockman. East Asian Social Movements: Power, Protest and Change in a Dynamic Region. New York: Springer, 2011.
- Calhoun, Craig. Neither Gods nor Emperors: Students and the Struggle for Democracy in China. Berkeley: University of California Press, 1994.
- Chu-yuan, Cheng. Behind the Tiananmen Massacre: Social, Political, and Economic Ferment in China. Boulder: Westview Press, 1990.
- Fang, Deng. Unintendeed Outcomes of Social Movements: The 1989 Chinese Student movement. London: Routledge, 2011.
- Dingxin, Zhou . The Power of Tiananmen: State-Society Relations and the 1989 Beijing Student Movement. Chicago: University of Chicago Press, 2001.
- Dittmer, Lowell. "China in 1989: The Crisis of Incomplete Reform." Asian Survey, Vol 30, No.1, A Survey of Asia in 1989: Part 1 (Jan., 1990), pp. 25–41.
- Khu, Josephine. "Student Organization in the Movement," Chinese Democracy and the Crisis of 1989: Chinese and American Reflections. eds. Roger V. Des Forges, Luo Ning, Wu Yen-bo.Albany: State University of New York
- Zhang, Liang. The Tiananmen Papers. eds. Perry Link and Andrew J. Nathan. New York: Public Affairs, 2001.
- Eds. Mok Chiu Yu and J. Frank Harrison. Voices From Tiananmen Square: Beijing Spring And The Democracy Movement. Montreal: Black Rose Books, 1990.
- Niming, Frank. "Learning How To Protest," The Chinese People's Movement: Perspectives on Spring 1989. ed. Tony Saich. New York: M.E. Sharpe, Inc, 1990.
- Li, Lu. Moving the Mountain: My Life in China From the Cultural Revolution to Tiananmen Square. London: Macmillan, 1990.
- Ling, Chai. A Heart for Freedom: The Remarkable Journey of a Young Dissident, Her Daring Escape, and Her Quest to Free China's Daughters. Tyndale House Publishers, 2011.
- Schock, Kurt. Unarmed Insurrections: People Power Movements in Nondemocracies. Minneapolis, University of Minnesota Press, 2005.
- Simmie, Scott and Bob Nixon. Tiananmen Square. Vancouver: Douglas & MacIntyre, 1989.
