= Liu Guichun =

Liu Guichun (Chinese: 刘桂春; pinyin: Liú Guìchūn; 1933 – October 10, 2007) was a Chinese police officer known for his appeal to the international media in concern to his son Liu Gang's persecution in jail. He served as a section chief cadre in Public Security Bureau in Liaoyuan.

After his second child, Liu Gang, sentenced to a six-year jail term as a leader of the 1989 Tiananmen Square protests, Liu Guichun was protested that his son was being tortured seriously and the Chinese government reportedly forbade his family from visiting illegally in Lingyuan Labor-Reform Camp. Through giving interviews to foreign reporters and wrote open letters to the international human rights organizations, Liu Guichun and his family called upon the international media to draw attention to human rights in China. Persecuted by the Chinese Communist Party, Liu was suspended as a police officer. He later declared his withdrawal from the Chinese Communist Party.

Married with Huang Guiqin, Liu had four children, including Liu Gang, Liu Ming, and Liu Yong.
