= Liu Gang =

Chinese scientist and revolutionary (born 1961)

- 刘刚
- Born: 30 January 1961 (age 65); Liaoyuan, Jilin, China
- Education: University of Science and Technology of China (BS); Peking University (MA); Columbia University (MA); New York University
- Known for: Participation in the 1989 Tiananmen Square protests
- Title: Founder of Beijing Students' Autonomous Federation
- Father: Liu Guichun

Liu Gang
- Traditional Chinese: 劉剛
- Simplified Chinese: 刘刚
Transcriptions
Standard Mandarin
- Hanyu Pinyin: Liú Gāng

Liu Gang (Chinese: 刘刚; born 30 January 1961) is a Chinese-born American aerospace engineer, computer scientist, optical physicist, political activist, and writer. He founded the Beijing Students' Autonomous Federation. He was a prominent student leader at the Tiananmen Square protests of 1989. Liu holds an M.A. in physics from Peking University and an M.A. in computer science from Columbia University. After his exile to the United States in 1996, Liu studied technology and physics at Bell Labs in New Jersey. Liu was employed at Morgan Stanley as a Wall Street IT analyst.

== Student activist ==
As an undergraduate student at University of Science and Technology of China in Hefei, Liu met Fang Lizhi, a pro-democracy activist. Then, at Peking University, Liu organized "Democracy Salons". Wang Dan later held a position there.

Liu was a 28-year-old graduate when the 1989 demonstrations began. He organized the Beijing Students' Autonomous Federation and joined the movement's organizing body. As a result, he was sixth on a list of twenty-one activists whose arrests were ordered by the government. Liu went into hiding as a fugitive, but on 15 June 1989, Liu was arrested and charged with attempted subversion of the Chinese Communist Party. In 1991, he was convicted and sentenced to six years imprisonment at Qincheng Prison.

After his release from prison in 1996, Liu continued to advocate for human rights in China and organized an underground democracy movement. After moving to the United States, Liu continued his studies at Columbia University in New York City. From there, he continued to support the Chinese democracy movement and in 2011, initiated further pro-democracy protests.

== Scientific research ==
=== China ===
In 1982, Liu received a bachelor's degree in modern mechanics from the University of Science and Technology of China. He was employed by the Aviation Industry Corporation of China in Shenyang in the field of aerodynamics. He worked in partnership with Luo Yang, and was promoted to head of aircraft design. Liu's field of research was the theory of air resistance, and he worked on problems of double-sided entry and radar technology.

In 1984, Liu received a master's degree in optics from the Department of Physics at Peking University in Beijing. While there, he was an assistant teacher. Liu returned to work at the China Soft Science Research Institute but was also acting assistant director at the University of Science and Technology of China.

In 1988, Liu became an assistant and associate researcher at the Wear-Resistant Materials Development Company of the National Ministry of Higher Education and the Dalian Institute of Technology. He was then transferred to research in the Department of Physics at the Chinese Academy of Sciences.

=== United States ===
In 1996, Liu received a master's degree in computer science from Columbia University. He was invited to speak at the New York Academy of Sciences. Liu gained employment as a member of technical staff (MTS) at the Mathematics of Networks and Systems Research Department at Bell Laboratories in Murray Hill, New Jersey. There he worked on Optical telecommunication network design and planning, routing algorithms, optimization techniques, and economic models and strategy analysis.

Liu's areas of research included: SPIDER, a design tool for fast-restoration in all-optical networks; VPNStar, a system for provisioning multi-service VPNs with Quality of service guarantees over Internet Protocol; in software design, a management system for Lambda Router in all-optical networks; and analysis of Internet pricing.

During his days at Bell Laboratories, Liu introduced the A*Prune (1999, ISSN 0743-166X) with K. G. Ramakrishnan, to describe a new class of algorithm. This opened a new research direction in theoretical science. He found that A*Prune is comparable to the current best known-approximate algorithms for most randomly generated graphs. The algorithm constructs paths, starting at the source and going towards the destination. But, at each iteration, the algorithm is rid of all paths that are guaranteed to violate the constraints, thereby keeping only those partial paths that have the potential to be turned into feasible paths, from which the optimal paths are drawn.

Liu also proposed a special class of Optical devices called SPIDER (2001, ISSN 1089-7089); optical routers, dense wavelength division multiplexing (DWDM) systems, and cross-connects of unprecedented capacities. Liu and his colleagues are developing techniques for efficient and reliable optical network design, covering decentralized dedicated protection to shared path-based mesh restoration.
