= Tamkang University =

Private university in Tamsui District, New Taipei City, Taiwan

- 淡江大學 (Chinese)
- Former name: Tamkang Junior College of English
- Motto: 樸實剛毅 (Pe̍h-ōe-jī: Phok-si̍t Kong-gē)
- Motto in English: Simplicity Truthfulness Firmness Perseverance
- Type: Private
- Established: 1950
- Affiliations: EUTW; IAU; Tsinghua Big Five Alliance; U12 Consortium; EPU
- President: Keh Huan-chao (葛煥昭 博士)
- Academic staff: 1,367 (2020)
- Administrative staff: 583 (2020)
- Students: 24,209 (2020) (excluding foreign and overseas Chinese students)
- Undergraduates: 21,488 (2020)
- Postgraduates: 2,721 (2020)
- Doctoral students: 394 (2020)
- Other students: 681 (foreign students) (2020); 776 (overseas Chinese students) (2020)
- Location: Tamsui, New Taipei, Taiwan; 25.175°N 121.449°E
- Campus: Urban, 21.62 ha (53.4 acres) (Tamsui campus) 0.32 ha (0.79 acres) (Taipei campus) 40.45 ha (100.0 acres) (Lanyang campus)
- Website: tku.edu.tw

Chinese name
- Simplified Chinese: 淡江大学
- Traditional Chinese: 淡江大學
Transcriptions
Standard Mandarin
- Hanyu Pinyin: Dànjiāng Dàxué
- Wade–Giles: Tan Chiang Ta Hsueh
Southern Min
- Hokkien POJ: Tām-kang Tāi-ha̍k
- Tâi-lô: Tām-kang Tāi-ha̍k

Tamkang University (TKU; simplified Chinese: 淡江大学; traditional Chinese: 淡江大學; Pe̍h-ōe-jī: Tām-kang Tāi-ha̍k) is a private university in Tamsui District, New Taipei City, Taiwan. It was founded in 1950 as a junior college of English. Today it is a comprehensive university with 11 colleges that serves nearly 25,000 students on four campuses (three traditional, one online).

Tamkang University is Taiwan's oldest private institution of higher learning. Over 28,000 students of 50 nationalities form a diverse student body. Tamkang has partnerships with over 100 sister universities in 28 countries. The university's main campus in historic Tamsui is noted for its scenery.

== History ==
Established in 1950 as a junior college of English, Tamkang first offered a two-year program and then a three-year program. It was not until 1958, after it was reorganized as a College of Arts and Sciences, that Tamkang awarded bachelor's degrees to its graduates. In 1980 Tamkang was elevated to the university status.

Today, Tamkang University has 11 colleges comprising 47 departments and divisions, 50 master's programs, and 17 doctoral programs. The total student enrollment is 28,075 and the number of faculty and staff members is 2,288.

The university has four campuses: the main campus in the Tamsui District of New Taipei City, the Taipei City campus, the Lanyang campus in Jiaoxi Township in Yilan County, and the online Cyber Campus.

=== Development ===
Tamkang University developed in four broad stages.

- The First Wave (1950–1980) is the Foundation Period, referring to the difficult times and hardships of Tamkang Junior College of English and those of Tamkang College of Arts and Sciences, adopting the policy of emphasizing "both quantity and quality."
- The Second Wave (1980–1996) marks the Positioning Period, referring to the period when Tamkang was elevated to the status of a university, emphasizing its policy of "quality over quantity."
- The Third Wave (1996–2005) signifies the Uplifting Period, referring to the university's forty-sixth founding anniversary, when the University Chueh-sheng Memorial Library was officially open, linking the university with international academic circles and marching toward the goal of becoming a first-rate world-class university.
- The Fourth Wave (2005–present) marks the Transitional Period, which started when Tamkang's third campus, the Lanyang Campus, first recruited its incoming students. A fourth campus has since been added.

== Campuses ==
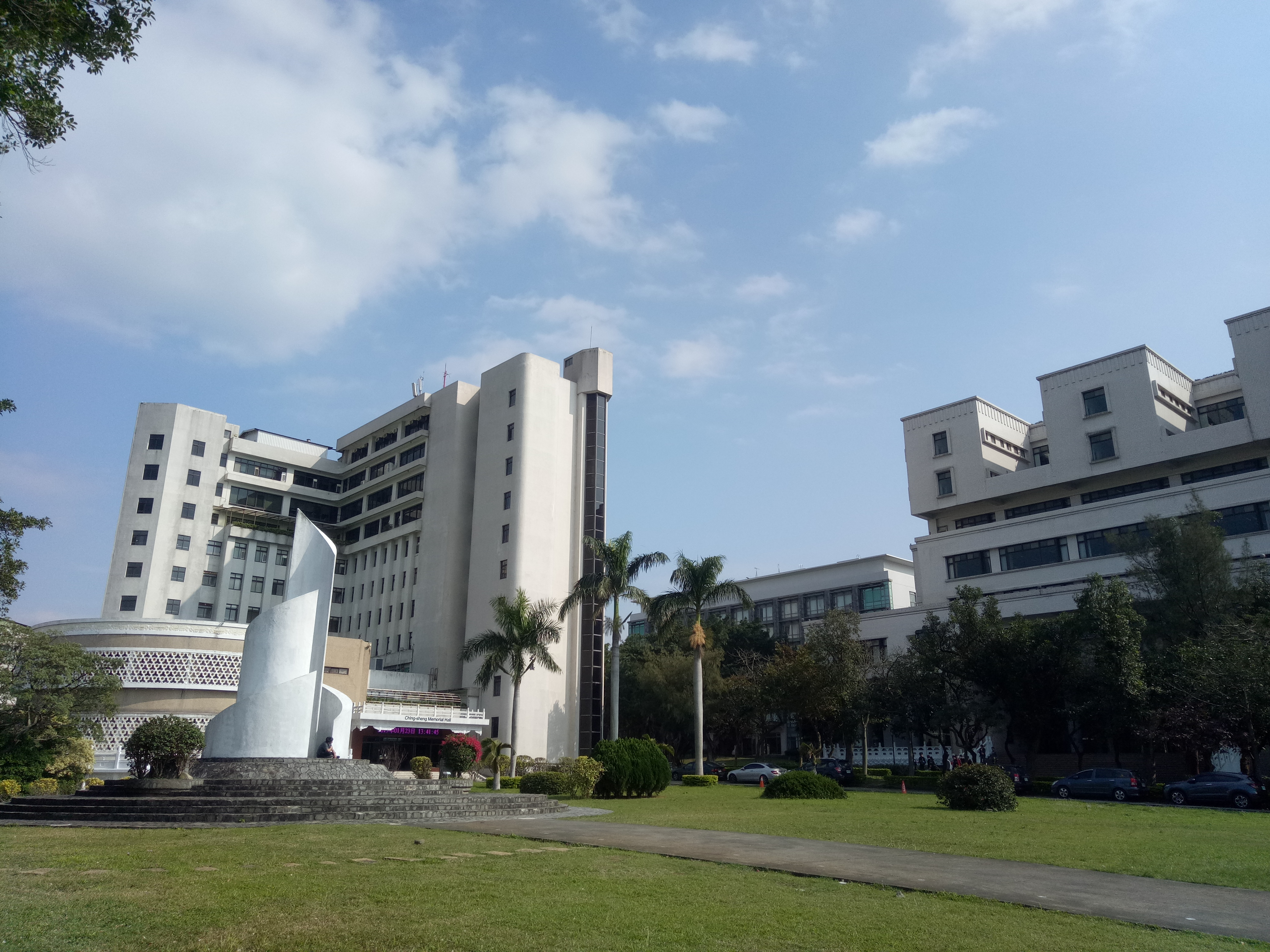
Tamsui Campus

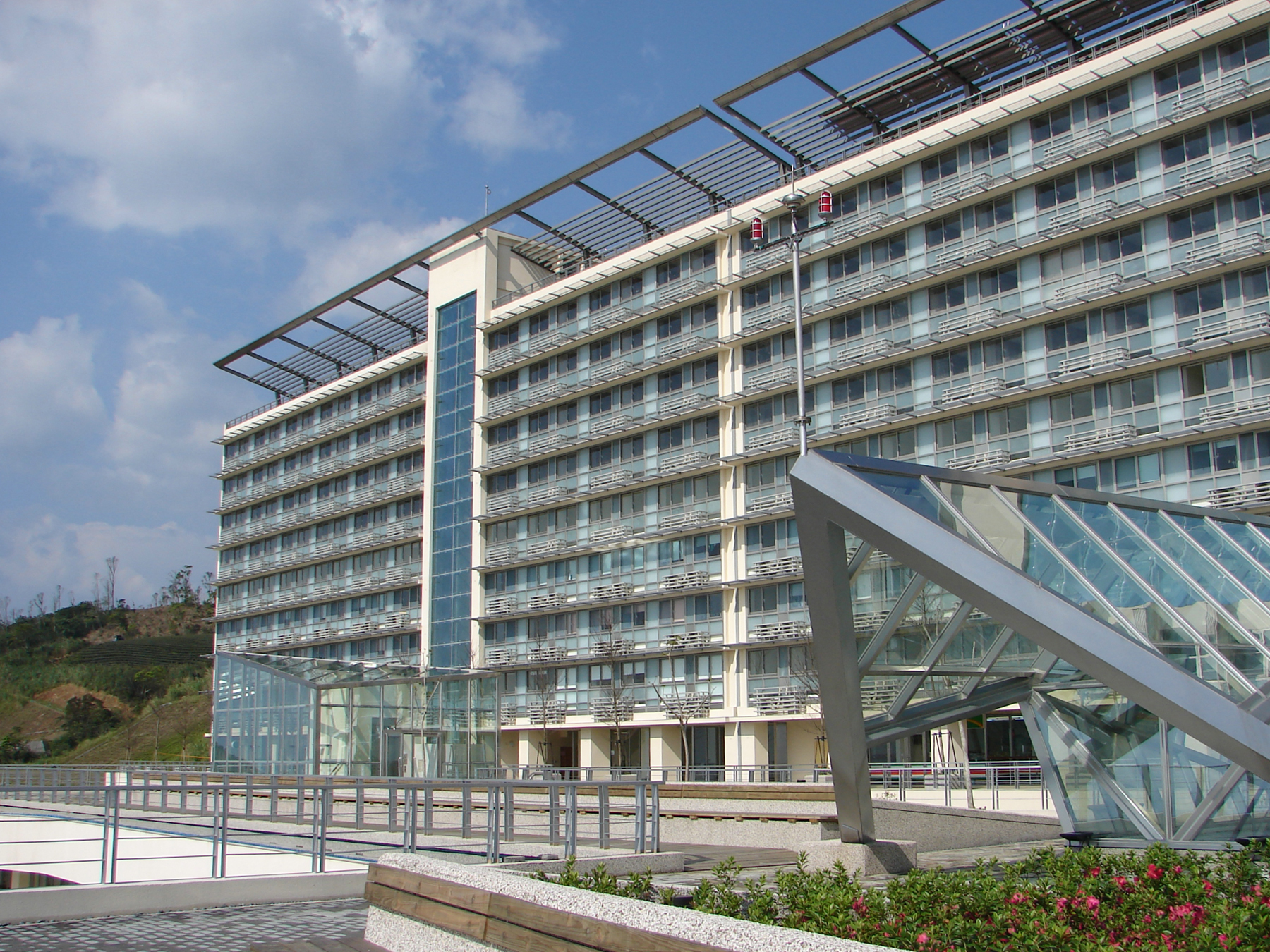
Lanyang Campus

- The Tamsui Campus represents an American-style research university.
- The Taipei Campus, called "The Sea of Knowledge Navigator", renders services such as lifelong education and continuing education as well as offering degrees, credit and non-credit courses to non-traditional students.
- The Lanyang Campus, called "The Garden of Wisdom," adopts the Oxbridge residential undergraduate education approach. English is the language of all course instruction. No graduate programs are offered on this campus at present.
- The Cyber Campus, called "The Space of Knowledge Explorer," provides students with flexible education at any time or place. An E-Learning Executive Master's Program in Educational Technology was established for on-the-job students in the 2006–2007 academic year. In the 2007–2008 academic year an E-Learning Executive Master's Program in Global Chinese Business Management was added for on-the-job learning by international business professionals.

Each campus offers specific functions in the realms of research, instruction, and services. A multi-disciplinary curriculum is being developed to meet the demands of students from widely varying backgrounds. The teaching resources of the four campuses remain integrated within one system.

=== Commons ===
Situated in the center of the vast compound before the Ching-sheng Memorial Hall is the University Commons edifice, built in 1986 and designed by architect Lin Kuei-jung, a Tamkang alumnus. The structures form four tablets of bamboo encircling one another.

=== The Bronze Sculpture of the Five Tigers ===
Five-tiger Hill is the site of the Tamsui Campus. The Tatuen range crests at Hutou Shan (Tiger's Head Mountain) which has five ridges. Tamkang University is on the fourth ridge. A bronze sculpture on campus depicts five tigers embracing one another. The work, by Wang Shiu-chi, stands in front of the Shao-mo Memorial Gymnasium and represents Tamkangians' vitality ("Hu-hu-shen-fong"). The base features the text of Clement C. P. Chang's essay "The Five-tiger Hill: A Sketch."

=== Sculpture of Hsuehshan Tunnel ===
The Rising Sun Above Hsuehshan Tunnel (Love of Lanyang and Devotion to Tamkang): The sculpture portraying the Hsuehshan Tunnel of the Taipei-Yilan Expressway was presented to Clement C. P. Chang in 1990 by the Association for Promotion of the Taipei-Yilan Rapid Transit System.

It is the work of Zerman Hu and Lanyang master sculptor Yu Yu Yang (Yang Ying-feng) and was commissioned by the Yilan Association, Taipei Chapter. The original sculpture was made from gilded stainless steel in the form of an ancient Chinese hieroglyph "山" (shan meaning "mountain"). The sculpture portrays the Hsuehshan Tunnel, the mountain itself (Hsuehshan = Snow Mountain), the rising sun shining over Lanyang, and the Pacific Ocean.

To celebrate the completion of the Lanyang Campus and the opening of the Taipei-Yilan Expressway, the university asked Arthur Yang, son of Yu Yu Yang, to render the original sculpture as a stainless-steel artwork 241 cm high and 270 cm wide. This larger sculpture is installed at the entrance to the Clement Chang International Conference Hall on the Lanyang Campus. The sculpture pays homage to the unsung heroes who built the expressway and symbolizes the university's Tamsui-Yilan connection.

== Admissions ==
Admission to Tamkang University is selective. Requirements vary with the nature of the program and the applicants.

=== Undergraduate ===
==== Freshmen ====
Taiwan residents are admitted after undergoing open screening procedures to review qualifications and examination scores.

==== Transfer students ====
The university offers limited opportunities to transfer into undergraduate programs. Admission is based on scores earned in the Entrance Examination for Transfer Students held each July at the university.

=== Graduate admissions ===
Tamkang University offers doctoral and master's degrees.

Seventeen Ph.D. degrees are offered in Chinese, English, Chemistry, Physics, American Studies, Management Sciences and Decision Making, Computer Science and Information Engineering, Water Resources and Environmental Engineering, Mathematics, Civil Engineering, Electrical Engineering, Banking and Finance, Industrial Economics, Mechanical and Electro-Mechanical Engineering, Chemical Engineering, and European Studies.

Master's degrees are offered in 49 fields including liberal arts, science, engineering, business, management, education, English, and Chinese literature.

== Rankings and awards ==
Tamkang University rankings

Global – Overall
- QS World: 1201–1400 (2024)
- THE World: 1201–1500 (2024)

Regional – Overall
- QS Asia: =359 (2025)
- THE Asia: 601+ (2024)

National – Overall
- QS National: 18–26 (2024)
- THE National: 21–43 (2024)

== Alumni ==
- Bruce Linghu, Deputy Minister of Foreign Affairs (2015–2016)
- Chang An-lo, Chairman of China Unification Promotion Party
- Chang Hsien-yao, Special Deputy Minister of Mainland Affairs Council (2013–2014)
- Chen Bang-yen, mathematician
- Crowd Lu, singer-songwriter and actor
- Dong Zhisen, journalist
- Fu Kun-chi, Magistrate of Hualien County (2009–2018)
- Gu Long, former novelist, screenwriter, film producer and director
- Gwei Lun-mei, actress
- Huang Chih-ta, Minister without Portfolio
- Hung Meng-chi, Minister of Culture (2014–2016)
- Irving H. C. Tai, former Deputy Minister of Research, Development and Evaluation Commission
- Janie Tsao, co-founder of Linksys
- Jocelyn Wang, actress
- Ker Chien-ming, acting Chairperson of Democratic Progressive Party (2011)
- Lin Teng-chiao, Administrative Deputy Minister of Education
- Lin Yu-fang, member of Legislative Yuan (2008–2016)
- Liu Shyh-fang, member of Legislative Yuan
- Lu Shiow-yen, mayor of Taichung
- Wu Maw-kuen, physicist
- Shi Shuqing, writer and educator

== See also ==
- List of universities in Taiwan
- EUTW university alliance
- Tsinghua Big Five Alliance
- U12 Consortium
