= Jason Hu =

Taiwanese politician (born 1948)

Hu Chih-chiang
- 胡志強
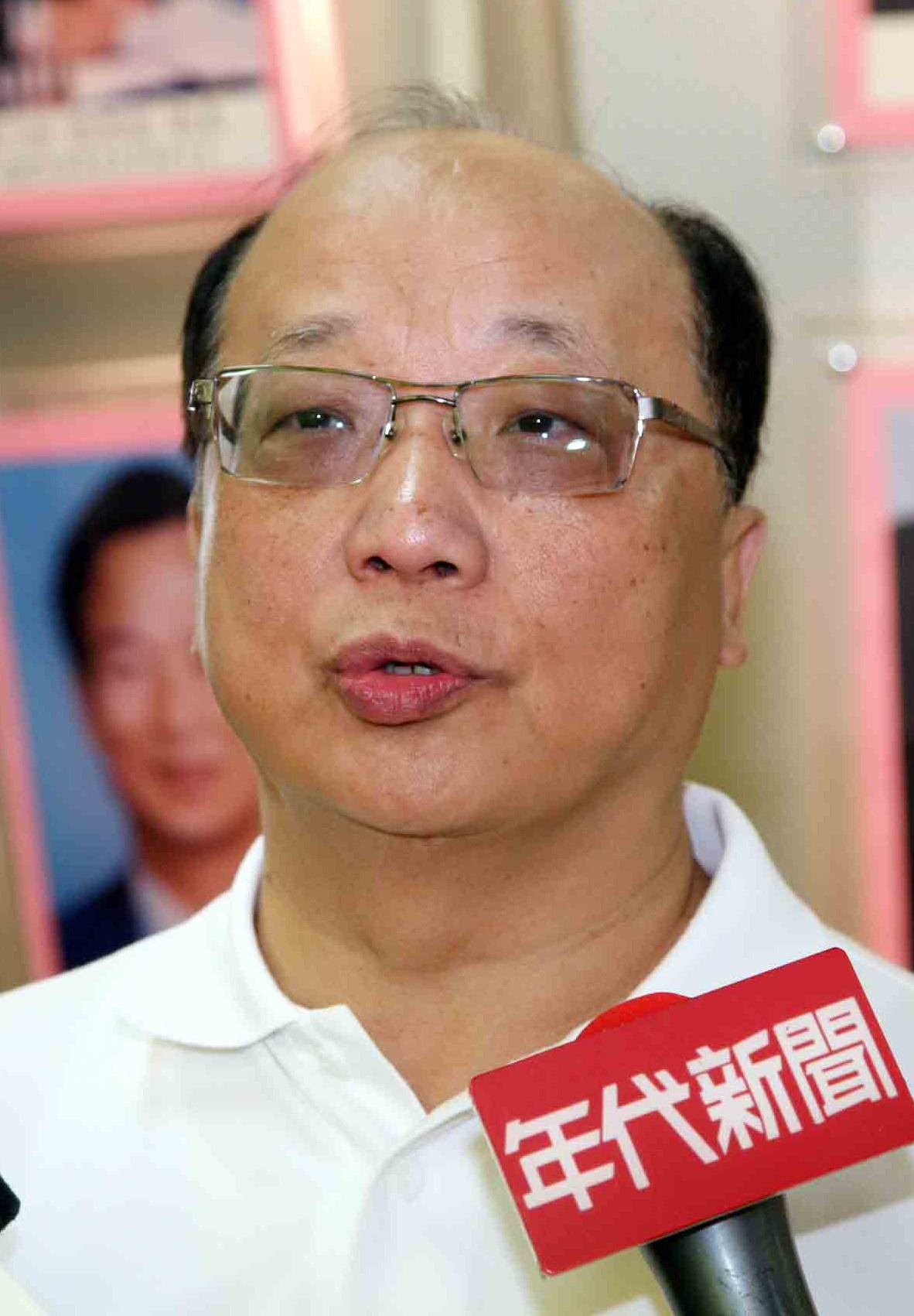
- Hu in 2010

Vice Chairman of the Kuomintang
- In office 18 May 2016 – 30 June 2017
- Chairperson: Hung Hsiu-chu
- In office 30 April 2014 – 19 January 2015
- Chairperson: Ma Ying-jeou

1st Mayor of Taichung
- In office 25 December 2010 – 25 December 2014
- Deputy: Hsiao Chia-chi; Tsai Ping-kun
- Preceded by: Himself as Mayor of Taichung (Municipal city)
- Succeeded by: Lin Chia-lung
- In office 20 December 2001 – 25 December 2010
- Preceded by: Chang Wen-ying
- Succeeded by: Himself as Mayor of Taichung (Special municipality)
Ministerial offices
Minister of the Foreign Affairs
In office 20 October 1997 – 30 November 1999
Prime Minister	Vincent Siew
Preceded by	John Chiang
Succeeded by	Chen Chien-jen
Representative of Taiwan to the United States
In office 1996–1997
MOFA Minister	Chiang Hsiao-yen
Preceded by	Benjamin Lu
Succeeded by	Stephen S. F. Chen
Minister of the Government Information Office
In office September 1991 – 10 June 1996
Prime Minister	Hau Pei-tsun; Lien Chan
Preceded by	Shao Yu-ming
Succeeded by	Su Chi

Personal details
- Born: 15 May 1948 (age 78) Beijing, Republic of China
- Party: Kuomintang
- Spouse: Shirley Shaw
- Children: 2, including Ting-Ting Hu
- Education: National Chengchi University (BA); University of Southampton (MSc); University of Oxford (DPhil)
- Scientific career
- Fields: International relations
- Thesis: Arms control policy of the People's Republic of China, 1949-1978 (1984)
- Doctoral advisor: Hedley Bull

Hu Chih-chiang (Chinese: 胡志強; pinyin: Hú Zhìqiáng; Wade–Giles: Hú Chìh-chiáng; born 15 May 1948), also known by his English name Jason Hu, is a Taiwanese diplomat and politician who was the mayor of Taichung from 2001 to 2004 when the city was a provincial city (2001–2010) and then a special municipality (2010–2014). A member of the Kuomintang (KMT), he served as Vice Chairman of the Kuomintang for two terms.

Before entering politics, Hu was an international relations professor who graduated from National Chengchi University and was educated in England, where he earned his doctorate from Oxford University in 1984.

== Early life and education ==
Hu was born in Beijing in the Republic of China on 15 May 1948, and became a war refugee to Taiwan as a young child when the Kuomintang lost the Chinese Civil War to the Communists in 1949. His father was a military officer in the National Revolutionary Army.

Hu was raised in Taichung and, after graduating from Taichung Municipal First Senior High School, studied law and diplomacy at National Chengchi University (NCCU). As an undergraduate, he served as the president of the university's students' union and was chosen to represent the Republic of China at the World League for Freedom and Democracy in 1968. He graduated from Chengchi with a bachelor's degree in diplomatic studies in 1970, then became a graduate student in the United States, where he studied at the University of South Carolina from 1971 to 1973 to complete a master's degree in international relations, but had to withdraw due to his father's ailing health.

Hu ultimately left the U.S. to continue his graduate studies in England at the University of Southampton, where academic reports there described him as "a very thoughtful and exceptionally hard-working student". He earned a Master of Science (M.Sc.) degree in international relations from Southampton in 1978. He then entered the University of Oxford as a doctoral student at Balliol College, Oxford, and earned his Doctor of Philosophy (D.Phil.) in international relations in 1984. Among his classmates at Oxford was American author Thomas L. Friedman. His doctoral dissertation, completed under Professor Hedley Bull, was titled, "Arms control policy of the People's Republic of China, 1949-1978".

== Academic career ==
After receiving his doctorate, Hu served as a fellow at Antony's College, Oxford, in 1985. When he returned to Taiwan, he became a professor at the Sun Yat-Sen Institute for International Studies at National Sun Yat-sen University (NSYSU). He would remain a professor there until he entered government service in 1990.

== Central Government ==
According to Hu's memoir, his entry into politics began in 1988, when he was still a university professor. That year, Hu was appointed to oversee the organization of the World League for Freedom and Democracy conference held in Palau. Following the event, he was recruited by the league's chairman, Chao Tzu-chi and vice chairman Han Lih-wu, to serve as its secretary-general. In this role, Hu participated in the league's rebranding and international outreach efforts, through which he gradually gained political visibility.

Jason Hu began his work in the central government when Taiwan was still a single-party state ruled by KMT. He was the Director General for the Government Information Office from 1991 to 1996. He then represented ROC government in the United States in 1996 and 1997 as the Director of the Taipei Economic and Cultural Representative Office in Washington, D.C., before a two-year stint as the Minister of Foreign Affairs from 1997 to 1999.

== Taichung City Mayor ==
Chuang Lung-chang had registered Hu for the 2001 Taipei County Magistracy election. His candidacy for Taichung was approved by the Kuomintang in February 2001, and Hu eventually withdrew from Taipei County. He was able to win the three-way race with more than forty-nine percent of the vote. Mayor Hu took office in early 2002.

Running on the campaign slogan, "North Taiwan has Ma [Ying-jeou], the South has [Frank] Hsieh, and central Taiwan needs Hu." he tried "internationalize" the city and to bring a branch of the Guggenheim Museum to Taichung.

=== Terror poster controversy ===
A reason for the failure to bring the Guggenheim to Taichung may have something to do with the Terror Poster that was used as a part of the pan-Blue presidential campaign of Lien Chan and James Soong in the 2004 presidential race.

=== Calming tensions ===
The presidential election itself was very close, and hot tempers broke out all over the country, especially in Taipei and Kaohsiung. There was also potential for serious trouble in Taichung as well as pan-Blue supporters had begun demonstrating overnight. Mayor Hu went out at about 3:30 in the morning and was successful in dispersing the one or two thousand people by 5:30. Mayor Hu remarked, "Because I knew that if I didn't do anything by 5:30 am, people getting out of bed would find out about it on the radio or television. There'd be 10,000, 20,000 people. By then you wouldn't be able to resolve it."

=== Re-election ===
Jason Hu won re-election with relative ease in the three-in-one elections on 3 December 2005 with a nearly twenty percent margin of victory over Democratic Progressive Party challenger Lin Chia-lung. His second term began in early 2006 and ended in early 2010. He was under pressure in 2010 after the shooting of Weng Chi-nan revealed potential ties between Taichung City Police and gangsters.

On 25 December 2010, Taichung City was merged with Taichung County and upgraded as a united special municipality named "Taichung City". Hu defeated DPP candidate Su Jia-chyuan in 2010 Republic of China municipal election on 27 November 2010 for the mayoralty of the newly created municipal city.

2010 Taichung City Mayoral Election Result
Party	#	Candidate	Votes	Percentage
Democratic Progressive Party	1	Su Jia-chyuan	698,358	48.88%
Kuomintang	2	Jason Hu	730,284	51.12%
Total			1,428,642	100.00%
Voter turnout			73.15%	

=== Taiwanese fisherman shooting incident ===
After the shooting of Taiwanese fisherman by a Philippine government vessel on 9 May 2013 within disputed waters in South China Sea, Hu urged Taichung residents to avoid traveling and investing in the Philippines, and asking for members across the party line to stand united against the Philippine government.

=== 2014 Taichung City mayoral election ===
Mayor Jason Hu campaigning for his 2014 Taichung mayoral election.

On 29 November 2014, Hu joined the Republic of China municipal election as a Kuomintang candidate for Mayor of Taichung going against Lin Chia-lung of the Democratic Progressive Party. Hu however lost to Lin.

2014 Taichung City Mayoral Election Result
No.	Candidate	Party	Votes	Percentage
1	Jason Hu	KMT	637,531	42.94%
2	Lin Chia-lung	DPP	847,284	57.06%

In December 2014, Hu accepted an offer from Feng Chia University to serve as department chair upon the conclusion of his third mayoral term. In February 2015, Hu joined the China Times. Eric Chu, the KMT's 2016 presidential candidate, named Hu the manager of his campaign in December 2015.

== Personal life ==
=== Family ===
Hu is married to the former actress Shirley Shaw. He and his wife have a daughter, British born actress Judy Hu, and a son, Jess Hu.

=== Car accident ===
On 18 November 2006, returning from a campaign rally for KMT Kaohsiung mayoral candidate Huang Jun-ying, the vehicle Hu and his wife, Shirley Shaw were riding in was hit by another vehicle and overturned. Hu suffered minor injuries, while Shaw suffered severe injuries and had to be put into a drug-induced coma to preserve her life. Shaw's left forearm was amputated, and her spleen was removed. Shortly after the crash, the Legislative Yuan proposed an amendment to the Road Traffic Management and Punishment Law requiring the driver and all passengers in a car use seat belts. Shaw recovered enough in February 2007 to return home during Lunar New Year.

Government offices
Preceded by John Chiang	ROC Foreign Minister; 1997–1999	Succeeded by Chen Chien-jen
Preceded by Chang Wen-ying	Mayor of Taichung (Provincial city); 2001–2010	Succeeded by Jason Hu
Preceded by Jason Hu	Mayor of Taichung (Municipality); 2010–24 Dec 2014	Succeeded by Lin Chia-lung
