= Chang Wen-ying =

Taiwanese politician

- 張溫鷹
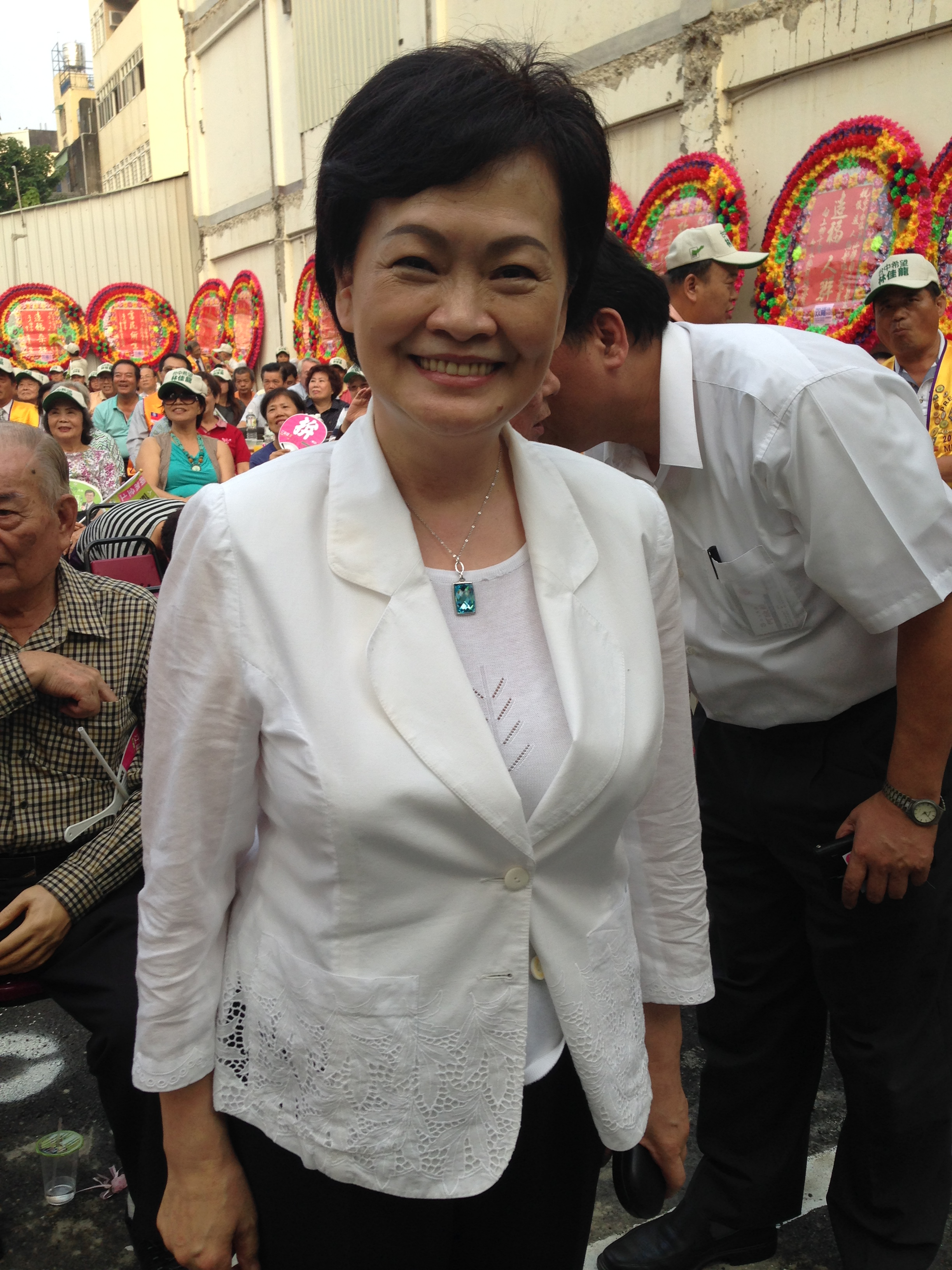

Mayor of Taichung
- In office 20 December 1997 – 20 December 2001
- Preceded by: Lin Po-jung
- Succeeded by: Jason Hu

Personal details
- Born: 26 July 1950 (age 75) Taichung, Taiwan
- Party: Democratic Progressive Party
- Spouse: Chen Wen-hsien
- Education: Kaohsiung Medical University (BSN); Chung Shan Medical University (MS); Taipei Medical University (MDS)

Chang Wen-ying (or Chang Wen-ing; Chinese: 張溫鷹; pinyin: Zhāng Wēnyīng; born 26 July 1950) is a Taiwanese politician.

She was imprisoned for two years after performing plastic surgery on Shih Ming-teh, who was attempting to flee Taiwan shortly after the Kaohsiung Incident. After her release, Chang ran unsuccessfully for a seat on the National Assembly in 1986. With the help of Taichung mayor Chen Tuan-tang, Chang was elected to the Taiwan Provincial Consultative Council (TPCC) in 1989. She married Chen's son Chen Wen-hsien in 1990. Upon the end of her second term on the TPCC, Chang served as Mayor of Taichung from 1997 to 2001. She left the Democratic Progressive Party run an independent mayoral campaign in 2001, after finishing low in opinion polls. Her bid for reelection split the Pan-Green Coalition vote between herself and Michael Tsai, allowing Jason Hu to win.

== Education ==
After graduating from Taipei Municipal Zhongshan Girls High School, Chang studied nursing at Kaohsiung Medical University and graduated with a Bachelor of Nursing. She then earned a master's degree in nursing from China Medical University and a degree in dentistry from Chung Shan Medical University.
