= Lin Chia-lung =

Taiwanese political scientist and politician (born 1964)

- 林佳龍
- Official portrait, 2024

28th Minister of Foreign Affairs
- Incumbent
- Assumed office 20 May 2024
- Prime Minister: Cho Jung-tai
- Preceded by: Joseph Wu

38th Secretary-General to the President
- In office 31 January 2023 – 20 May 2024
- President: Tsai Ing-wen
- Deputy: Alex Huang
- Preceded by: David Lee
- Succeeded by: Pan Men-an

27th Minister of Transportation and Communications
- In office 14 January 2019 – 19 April 2021
- Premier: Su Tseng-chang
- Preceded by: Wang Kwo-tsai (acting)
- Succeeded by: Wang Kwo-tsai

2nd Mayor of Taichung
- In office 25 December 2014 – 25 December 2018
- Deputy: Lin Ling-san; Pan Wen-chung
- Preceded by: Jason Hu
- Succeeded by: Lu Shiow-yen

Member of the Legislative Yuan
- In office 1 February 2012 – 25 December 2014
- Preceded by: Daniel Huang
- Succeeded by: Huang Kuo-shu
- Constituency: Taichung 6

11th Secretary-General of the Democratic Progressive Party
- In office 25 January 2006 – 15 October 2007
- Chairman: Chen Shui-bian
- Preceded by: Lee I-yang
- Succeeded by: Cho Jung-tai

21st Director-General of the Government Information Office
- In office 20 May 2004 – 13 March 2005
- Prime Minister: Yu Shyi-kun; Frank Hsieh
- Preceded by: Huang Huei-zhen
- Succeeded by: Pasuya Yao

Personal details
- Born: 13 February 1964 (age 62) Taipei, Taiwan
- Party: Democratic Progressive Party
- Spouse: Liao Wan-ju
- Education: National Taiwan University (BA, MA); Yale University (MPhil, MA, PhD)
- Scientific career
- Fields: Political science
- Thesis: Paths to democracy: Taiwan in comparative perspective (1998)
- Doctoral advisor: Juan José Linz

Chinese name
- Traditional Chinese: 林佳龍
- Simplified Chinese: 林佳龙
Transcriptions
Standard Mandarin
- Hanyu Pinyin: Lín Jiālóng
- Wade–Giles: Lin2 Chia1-lung2

Lin Chia-lung (Chinese: 林佳龍; pinyin: Lín Jiālóng; born 13 February 1964) is a Taiwanese political scientist and politician who has served as Minister of Foreign Affairs since 2024. He previously served as the Secretary General to the President from 2023 to 2024.

Before entering politics, Lin graduated from National Taiwan University, earned three degrees from Yale University, and became a professor of political science at National Chung Cheng University. As a member of the Democratic Progressive Party (DPP), he ran in the 2014 Taiwanese local elections and was elected as Mayor of Taichung, serving from 2014 to 2018.

== Early life and education ==
Lin was born in Wanhua District, Taipei City, in 1964. He has two sisters. He was raised in a poor family; both his mother and maternal grandfather were debtors. His father was a suit tailor from Mailiao, Yunlin, who studied in Taipei but, after failing to pass the college entrance exam, left his hometown to work in Wanhua. His mother was from Lukang, Changhua County. When Lin was an infant, the family's house burned down.

Lin attended Taipei Municipal Chien Kuo High School, where he was elected class monitor, and graduated in 1982. Afterwards, he enrolled at National Taiwan University (NTU) and graduated with his Bachelor of Arts (B.A.) in political science in 1986 and his master's degree in political science in 1988. As an undergraduate, he was an active student activist, serving as president of the NTU "Mainland Affairs Research Society," a small Kuomintang dissident group, and as a representative of the university's student union. He completed compulsory military service in the Republic of China Army in the 10th Air Defense Artillery Corps.

In 1990, Lin was one of the co-leaders of the Wild Lily student movement along with Luo Wen-jia and Julian Kuo. In 1991, while studying for his doctorate at NTU, Lin was awarded a Fulbright Scholarship to complete his graduate studies in the United States. He earned a Master of Philosophy (M.Phil.) in 1992, a second Master of Arts (M.A.) in 1993, and his Ph.D. in 1998, all from Yale University in political science. His doctoral dissertation, "Paths to democracy: Taiwan in comparative perspective," was completed under political scientist Juan José Linz.

== Academic career ==
As a doctoral student at Yale, Lin developed a research interest in the political development of China; in 1995, at the invitation of the Ford Foundation, he conducted field research in Beijing, Tianjin, Shanghai, Nanjing, and Wuhan on village self-government and grassroots elections. After receiving his doctorate, he spent a year in Tokyo, Japan, as a research associate at the United Nations University.

In 1999, Lin became an assistant professor of political science at National Chung Cheng University, a position he held until 2004. He also concurrently taught as a professor at the National Taichung Institute of Technology. His principal fields of research included comparative democratization, political economy, regional security, and the political and economic development of the Asia-Pacific region and China.

During the late 1990s, Lin and Chu Yun-han jointly led a National Science Council research project comparing Taiwan's democratization and constitutional development with political transitions elsewhere. His research on China and cross-strait politics resulted in a published volume co-edited with Qiu Zeqi in 1999, and then a second volume co-edited with Zheng Yongnian in 2001.

== Political career ==
In the early 2000s, he served in various capacities in the Executive Yuan under DPP President Chen Shui-bian. Lin was appointed an advisor to the National Security Council in 2000, and to the position of cabinet spokesman in 2003. Lin represented the government position in a debate against Legislator Kao Chin Su-mei, where he argued in favor of arms procurements which would be submitted to referendum the following year.

Due to his performance as cabinet spokesman, Lin was appointed director of the Government Information Office (GIO) by President Chen Shui-bian following his reelection in 2004. In January 2005, Lin authorized a GIO program encouraging donations to provide financial support for orphans of the 2004 Indian Ocean tsunami. Controversy over the program later arose in August 2005, five months after Lin had left GIO, surrounding the delay in disbursing NT$400 million in donations to various charities and NGOs. Media reports suggesting that the program had been neglected in the transition between Lin and his successor at GIO, Pasuya Yao were denied by GIO, which promised the funds would be disbursed by September 5.

Lin resigned from his position as GIO director in March 2005 to run as DPP candidate for mayor of Taichung City. In the ensuing elections held in December 2005, Lin lost against incumbent Mayor Jason Hu by 87,075 votes (19.3%). In 2014 Lin ran again against Hu and won by a landslide margin with over 200,000 votes.

Lin was appointed DPP Secretary-General in January 2006, and Deputy Secretary-General to the President in October 2007.

== Mayor of Taichung (2014–2018) ==
Lin defeated DPP legislator Tsai Chi-chang in a public opinion poll that served as the party's primary on 31 December 2013. He was elected as the Mayor of Taichung after winning the Taichung mayoral election on 29 November 2014, defeating Kuomintang (KMT) incumbent Jason Hu.

During his term, Lin oversaw "Project Taichung Port 2.0", coordinating with the Ministry of Transportation and Communications and the Taiwan International Ports Corporation to plan and enhance the port area, including preservation of Gaomei Wetland in the northern portion and commercial development in the southern portions. The opening of Mitsui Outlet Park Taichung Port was said to have attracted NT$910 billion (approximately US$30 billion) in investments over 4 years.

Lin was re-nominated as the mayoral candidate in November 2017. He was defeated by KMT candidate Lu Shiow-yen.

== Post-mayoralty career ==
Lin succeeded Wang Kwo-tsai on 14 January 2019 who was acting Minister of Transportation and Communications. He resigned on 4 April 2021 in the aftermath of the Hualien train derailment which killed at least 49 people, stating that he would take full political responsibility for the crash and will leave once the rescue work ends.

In January 2022, Lin was appointed ambassador without portfolio in charge of promoting Taiwan's digital New Southbound Policy initiatives. He is expected to serve in this role until May 2024.

After Lo Chih-cheng decided not to contest the New Taipei mayoralty in July 2022, the DPP selected Lin as its candidate for the post. Lin lost to then-deputy mayor Hou Yu-ih in a landslide defeat in the general election.

From 31 January 2023, Lin served in the Chen Chien-jen cabinet as Secretary-General to the President.

== Minister of Foreign Affairs ==
Lin was designated as foreign minister by president-elect Lai Ching-te on 11 April 2024, succeeding Joseph Wu.

In August 2024, Lin and Joseph Wu (now National Security Council head) attended a closed-door security dialogue with United States officials through a "special channel." The format of the meeting was noted as a way to maintain communication between the two governments due to limits on contact allowed by the unofficial nature of Taiwan's relations with the U.S.

In November 2024, Lin remarked that the Taiwanese government did not oppose the restoration of Lithuania's diplomatic relations with China, following incoming prime minister Gintautas Paluckas's comments of doing so. Paluckas had stated his desire to repair relations with the Chinese government, who downgraded diplomatic ties with Lithuania and imposed trade restrictions following the establishment of the Taiwanese Representative Office in Lithuania in 2021.

Later that month, Lin embarked on a tour of European countries, including Belgium, Lithuania, and Poland. He attended a dinner ceremony marking the third anniversary of the establishment of the Taiwanese Representative Office in Vilnius.

== Personal life ==
Lin is married to Liao Wan-ju (廖婉如), niece of Taiwanese businessman and Chi Mei Corporation founder Shi Wen-long.

== Honors ==
- 2024 Order of Brilliant Star with Special Grand Cordon

== Selected works ==
- Lin, Chia-lung (1998). Paths to Democracy: Taiwan in Comparative Perspective (PhD thesis). Yale University.

Political offices
Preceded by Jason Hu	Mayor of Taichung; 25 December 2014 – 25 December 2018	Succeeded by Lu Shiow-yen
