= 1952 reorganization of higher education in China =

Chinese education reform in 1952

In China, the 1952 reorganization of higher education institutions (高等学校院系调整) was a national policy under the Chinese Communist Party (CCP), which came into power in 1949, to adopt Soviet-styled higher education. This policy focused more on engineering education and technical training while removing American influences among Chinese scholars. While eliminating private education, especially missionary higher education, the policy led to the state control over the higher education sector and the loss of faculty governance tradition since the 1920s. This served the Communist agenda to break up the prestigious universities established under the Republic of China, to weaken the historical ties between the university and the faculty, and to establish the political and organisational authority of the new Communist government over the higher education system. The reorganisation involved most of the higher education institutions in mainland China and influenced the basic structure of Chinese higher education today.

== Background ==
=== Establishment of modern higher education ===
The history of higher education in China dates back to the Shang dynasty (c. 1600 BC– c. 1045 BC). However, the education system in ancient China was highly elitist and centred around Confucianism, a form of humanism. Under the imperial examination system, the education system focused on training and selection of civil servants. When China was defeated by Britain in the Opium War (1839–1842), liberal intellectuals in China began to reflect on Western knowledge and technology, which stimulated reforms towards modern education systems. Missionary schools, which were founded and run by Christian missionaries, set an example for such reforms. The Self-Strengthening Movement and the subsequent Hundred Days' Reform in the 1890s gave birth to first modern universities in China, during which the advocates of westernisation in China founded Beiyang and Nanyang Public Schools, and the reformist government founded Imperial University of Beijing. Western academics, such as astrometry, geography, foreign languages, and mathematics, were gradually added and emphasised in the Chinese education systems, which used to teach students only about how to write eight-legged essays tailored for imperial examinations.

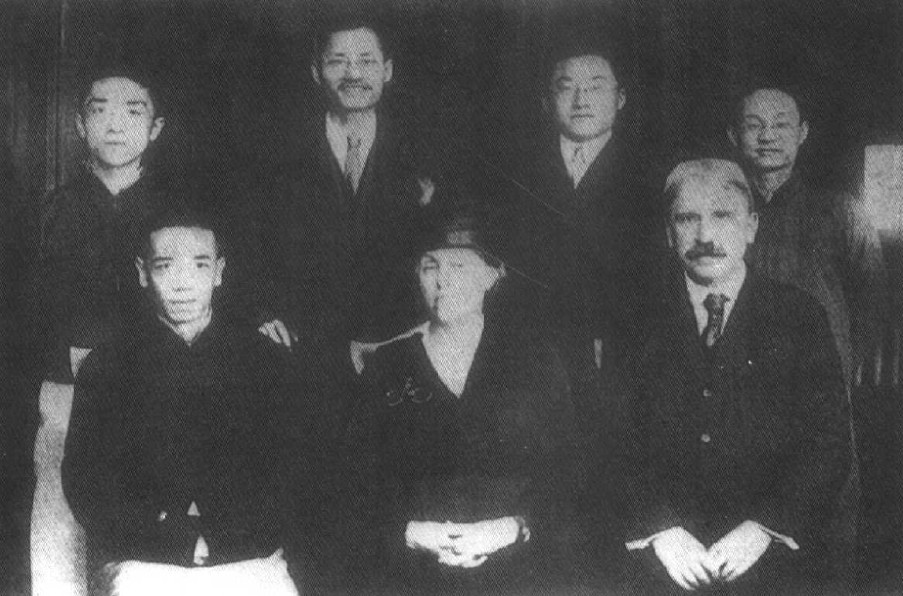
John Dewey and his Chinese students, who included Hu Shih, one of the most influential thought leaders in China

As the Nationalists, later known as Kuomintang (KMT), overthrew the Chinese monarchy and established a republic in the 1911 Revolution, the Nationalists and liberal intellectuals listed education and industrialisation as two priorities of the new republic. Running public universities became a government responsibility while private education and self-funded students to study abroad were permitted and encouraged. Influenced by the theory of John Dewey, Cai Yuanpei, the first Minister of Education of the new republic, believed that education should aim for growing intelligence of mind, personal traits that contribute to culture and society, democratic mobility and educational growth. He planned to put the education under autonomous, non-partisan, non-state organisations of educators, which contradicted the ideology of Nationalists, leading to a failure of Cai's reform plan. With a number of different education systems tried and abandoned, the government eventually introduced one that modelled after the United States education system.

Despite the reforms, the stress on politics, law and humanities continued in the education system, suggesting that people continued to consider education as a way to get into civil service. As the Nationalists regained control over the government in 1928, it started to exert more influence over the education system. All higher education institutions were required to register and be certified by the Ministry of Education. Religious proselytising became forbidden, while universities were required to teach Sun Yat-sen's Three Principles of the People, the state ideology. In addition, it established a network of national universities and managed to get more students enrolled in engineering and basic science programmes to meet the need of national development. The tightening of state control and pivot to engineering and science education continued and peaked in the early years of the subsequent Communist government.

=== Civil war, Communist rule and Korean War ===
At the time of the 1927 split-up between the Communists and Nationalists, Mao Zedong, who became the Communist leader in 1935, served as the acting minister of publicity and education within the Nationalists, responsible for training farmers to be revolutionaries. After the split-up, the Communists began to provide Soviet-styled public education in Ruijin and other areas under its control, during which the Communist education system focused on training Communist cadres, political and cultural education for the young people and literacy education for the general public. As the escalating Japanese invasion and the Nationalist policy of appeasement in the 1930s, caused discontent among university faculty and students, hyperinflation and the pervasive corruption further eroded people's support for the Nationalist government, leading to protests and demonstrations, which were responded with brutal suppression. Meanwhile, the Communist call for resistance and the United Front policy successfully attracted and recruited patriotic students. After Xi'an Incident in 1937, the Communist Party became recognised as a legal party within the Republic of China and provided public education in Shaan-Gan-Ning Border Region. During the time, the education system under Communist rule focused on political education and mobilisation among the people, which deeply influenced the Communist policy on education in the 1950s. The universities in Communist-controlled areas were not universities in a normal sense, as they typically aimed to teach Communist cadres about the Party's current policies, as well as the revolutionary history in China and in the West. But it provided a possible model for the university reorganisation after 1949.

There are still some intellectuals and other people in China who have muddled ideas and illusions about the United States. Therefore we should explain things to them, win them over, educate them and unite with them, so they will come over to the side of the people and not fall into the snares set by imperialism. But the prestige of U.S. imperialism among the Chinese people is completely bankrupt, and the White Paper is a record of its bankruptcy. Progressives should make good use of the White Paper to educate the Chinese people.

— Mao Zedong, Farewell, Leighton Stuart (18 August 1949)

The method of education of the People's Republic of China shall be the unification of theory and practice. The People's Government shall reform the old educational system, subject matter and teaching methods in a planned, systematic manner.

— Article 46, Common Program of Chinese People's Political Consultative Conference (29 September 1949)

With the Communist victory in the civil war in 1949, the new government vowed to build a "national, scientific, popular education", planning to replace the old education system, taught content and pedagogy. At first, the government promised to protect private education and took a gradual approach for the transformation in its first national meeting with education sectors in January 1950, as the Communists were clear that the universities were where they could get support from. Nevertheless, intellectuals at the universities were mostly influenced by American education and culture, and despite dissent towards the Nationalist government, they were also cautious about the Communists, holding a "wait-and-see" attitude. Eventually, the Chinese involvement in the Korean War in October changed the expectation of the government, which became less tolerant with intellectuals' noncooperation. As the war damaged the diplomatic relations between the United States and the Communists, the Communist government began to remove foreign influences from its education system. Therefore, the government reversed its advocacy for private education, and nationalised missionary universities subsidised by American funds. Especially, Mao quoted and criticised "the democratic individualism of China" from the US State Secretary Dean Acheson's China White Paper, from which Mao sensed the danger of pro-American intellectuals rooted within Chinese society.

== Prelude ==
=== Strengthening state control ===
In the First National Education Work Conference in December 1949, the government proposed its three key policies. First, higher education must serve national construction, especially economic construction. Second, higher education should be open to workers and peasants and they should be tuition-free at national universities. Third, higher education must transit into a planned economy. In particular, the Communist government stressed the ideological basis of the education, which differed education in the People's Republic from that in the past. As Ma Xulun said in the closing remark,

I think it is very necessary for every educator to clearly understand this essential difference between the old and the new education, because the new education and the old education are two different socio-economic reflections, and the difference between them is the difference between the nature of semi-feudal and semi-colonial education and the nature of new democratic education, and there should be no ambiguity. Education in old China could not but be "a reflection of the old political economy and an instrument through which the old political economy was sustained". This nature cannot but be reflected in a series of issues such as the guidelines, tasks, contents and methods of education at all levels. We must reject the nature and basic spirit of the old education. The content, system and methods of the old education must be reformed. All these should be affirmed without any doubt. However, such reform must be carried out in accordance with the provisions of Article 46 of the Common Program, and should be carried out step by step and cautiously.

— Ma Xulun, Closing remark of the First National Education Work Conference, 9 June 1950

As the three policies outlined the ideological basis of the upcoming education reform, in July 1950, the State Council further announced that universities must obey any order from the Ministry of Education, which, along with the fast expansion of Communist organisations within the universities, allowing the implementation of government orders in the Chinese universities.

=== Nationalisation of private education ===
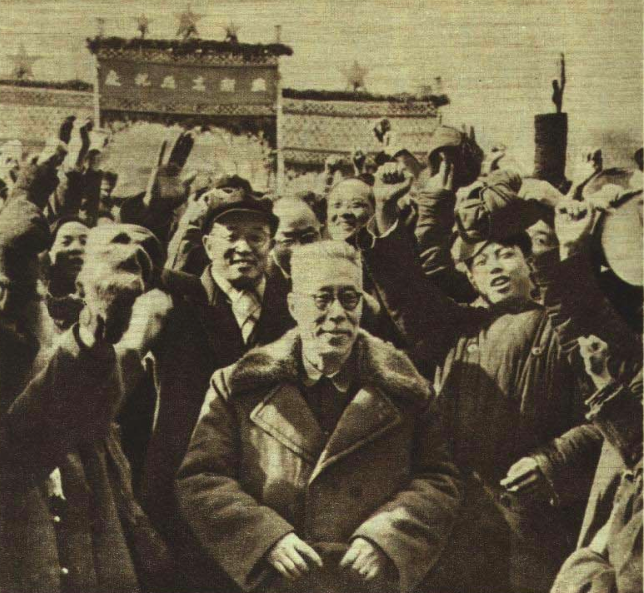
The Communist government took over Yenching University in Beijing in February 1950.

The Chinese intervention in the Korean War in late 1950 interrupted the plan for graduation transformation of the Chinese higher education system. The US government first froze Chinese assets in the US and banned remittance from the US to China, which cut missionary universities funding sources. With the Chinese government's order to nationalise missionary higher education in China, by the end of 1951, Fu Jen Catholic University, Yenching University, Tsin Ku University, Peking Union Medical College, Oberlin Shansi Memorial School, the University of Nanking, Ginling College, Fukien Christian University, Hwa Nan College, Huachung University, the Boone Library School and West China Union University had been transformed into public universities, while Soochow University, Cheeloo University, St John's University, Hangchow University, the University of Shanghai, Aurora University, Aurora College for Women, Lingnan University and Qiujing Business School were handed over to the Chinese yet remained private. In addition to the transformation of Christian higher education, private Great China University and Kwang Hua University were merged and formed into a new public university known as East China Normal University in 1951.

=== Thought reforms among intellectuals ===
Despite the government's ownership and administrative control over the universities, most Chinese universities hired professors with American backgrounds and taught in an American way. Thus, on 29 September, Premier Zhou Enlai made a speech to university professors in Beijing and Tianjin, calling for thought reforms among them. This was soon echoed by Dr Ma Yinchu, who was just appointed as the president of Peking University. According to an article by Dr Ma published by the state media People's Daily on 23 October 1951,

The faculty of Peking University maintained such a glorious revolutionary tradition that they were naturally willing to accept all new trends of thought. Therefore, they were able to transform an old type of university into a new university for the people. For more than two years after liberation, we have been working in a new direction. In order to achieve this goal, it is necessary to thoroughly restructure the faculties and departments, reform the curriculum, and improve the content and teaching methods in accordance with the needs of the country; and one of the main keys to achieving this goal is to make all the faculty and students of the university truly aware of the need for reform and to carry out ideological transformation consciously and voluntarily so that we ourselves can better serve the people. Although Peking University has carried out some reform work in the past two years or so, these achievements are still far from our ideal in terms of the needs of the country and our mission. Therefore, we have decided to launch a planned and systematic study campaign among the faculty and staff of the university. We will also respond to Premier Zhou's call to strengthen our ideological reform and to match our operational level with new tasks.

— Ma Yinchu, Political Learning Movement of Peking University Faculty, People's Daily, 23 October 1951

While the Thought Reform was by and large a spontaneous movement and initiated by the intellectuals themselves, in February 1952, the Communist Party further launched the Three-Anti Movement, leading to a nationwide criticism towards the ideology of bourgeoisie. The movement used political power to force intellectuals and scholars to change their ideology. As Ma Xulun, the Minister of Education, said,

Try to use hot water to scald these people, as long as the scalding does not kill them. They made self-criticism again and again in general meetings and small meetings, exposing their misdeeds by radio and large print, and mobilising many young party members (teaching assistants and students) to give these people 'back rubs'. If they failed in the self-criticism meeting, they followed the old teachers to their homes and observed their words and deeds, and added new charges to the self-criticism meeting the next day whenever there was a discrepancy.

— Directive of the Ministry of Education, quoted in On Party-People relations in Higher Education Institutions by Dong Weichuan

The two political campaigns eventually took ideological control of the cultural and education sectors, taming the intellectuals and suppressing dissidents. By the fall of 1952, around 91% of the faculty and 80% of the students passed the thought reform. The People's Daily, when addressing the university reorganisation plan in 1952, explained that "a serious ideological view of worshiping the Anglo-American bourgeoisie, sectarianism, nativism, and individualism" was removed by the thought reforms, which enabled the reorganisation of higher education.

=== Socialist models of modern university ===
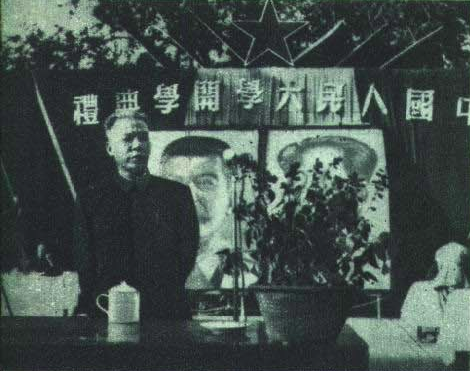
Liu Shaoqi made a public speech at the opening ceremony of Renmin University of China in October 1950.

Between 1949 and 1952, despite various suggestions from Chinese scholars to adapt higher education systems to a socialist society, the government decided to reorganise the education system to model after that of the Soviet Union. 126 Soviet experts were sent to China for consultation regarding all aspects of higher education. Between 1950 and 1960, 1,296 Soviet educators were sent to teach in China, around 8,000 to 10,000 Soviet specialists were deployed in China to assist in industrialisation. With the help from the Soviet Union, two model universities, Harbin Institute of Technology, which specialised in science and technology, and Renmin University of China (RUC), which specialised in humanities were built.

In 1950 alone, nearly one fifth of the Ministry of Education funding went into RUC. From 1950 to 1951, there were around 50 reports about the university on the state media People's Daily and People's Education. Liu Shaoqi, one of major Communist leaders, suggested that RUC would be China's first truly modern university, which the old universities that were developed under capitalism should model after.

A Soviet-styled system which combines academic departments, seminars, vivas and written examinations was introduced in RUC. RUC was the first university in China to teach and write textbooks about Marxism and Maoism. After the 1952 reorganisation, RUC became a flagship in Chinese higher education, attracting experts from all over the country to listen to the courses by Soviet experts on the campus. By 1956, there had been RUC graduates in almost every university in China as a head teacher in political theory.

=== Small-scale reorganisations ===
Small-scale reorganisation of universities and colleges began as early as the end of 1949. For example, the education departments of Peking University and Nankai University were merged into Beijing Normal University. The agricultural colleges of Tsinghua University, Peking University and North China University were merged into a new Beijing University of Agriculture. The management of Jiao Tong University was cancelled and merged into its own engineering school, Northern Jiao Tong University in Beijing, and Shanghai College of Finance and Economics. The civil engineering department of Fudan University was merged into Jiao Tong University. East China Institute of Textile Technology was formed anew on the basis of the department of textile of Jiao Tong University and other institutions. In September 1949, the department of history and geography, the department of law, and the department of economics at Zhejiang University, the colleges of humanities, law and commerce at Jinan University, and the departments of economics and law at Yingshi University were merged into Fudan University. In February 1950, Tongji University Medical College and its affiliated hospital moved to Wuhan to become an independent Central South Tongji Medical College.

== Implementation ==
The reorganisation was planned and implemented as part of the First Five-year Plan (1953–1957), with the suggestions from Soviet advisors, including Fomin and Arsenyev. To implement the reorganisation, the Ministry of Higher Education was formed and headed by Ma Xulun in the fall of 1952, upon Fomin's advice.

=== Centralisation of enrolment and employment ===
Prior to October 1951, local governments could request students from education authorities, yet the increasing need of talents during the industrialisation led to a job distribution system for all university students. On 19 July 1952, the State Council decided to introduce centralised job allocation system to ensure each university graduate to acquire lifetime tenure. This system gradually became a norm after the 1952 reorganisation until the dissolution of the planned economy in the 1980s.

Similarly, before the 1952 reorganisation, Chinese universities typically admitted students through separate examinations or joint examinations with other universities. Starting from 1950, the university admissions was designed to be a unified procedure within each greater administrative area. In 1952, the regional admissions procedures were replaced by a national system that admitted students into colleges and universities through national examinations, which later became known as Gaokao. On 21 July 1952, the Ministry of Education issued an instruction, which emphasised that unified university admissions was key to the national plan for cadre training. Thus, the enrolment of the universities were controlled with a centralised plan that served the planned economy.

=== Transformation of academic structures ===
Under the new education system. all higher education institutions were run by the government. The universities were further divided into three types, which include a limited number of comprehensive universities and multiple-discipline engineering universities, while most universities were single-discipline technical colleges. Although all universities were public under the new education system, they were affiliated with either the local government or the central government or a specific government agency. Academic departments became under direct affiliation of the university rather than a multi-department college. These departments were merely administrative units, which were further broken down into dedicated groups for teaching and research. Each group was responsible for teaching one or several relevant courses. The Party leadership became part of the university organisation, while political education became mandatory. By 1956, 57.3% of the college students in China joined the China Youth League, the youth division of the Communist Party. 5457 teachers were employed for specialised education in political theory.

=== Adjustments of course offerings ===
Change of college student enrolments from 1949 to 1952
Major	1949	1950	1951	1952	Change (1951–1952)
Engineering	30320	38462	48517	66583	+18066 (+37%)
Agriculture & Forestry	10361	13268	12000	15471	+347 (+29%)
Medicine	15234	17414	21356	24752	+3396 (+16%)
Normal education	12039	13312	18225	31551	+13326 (+73%)
Humanities	11829	10147	11936	13511	+1575 (+13%)
Science	6984	9845	7801	9563	+1762 (+23%)
Finance & Economics	19362	24084	25300	21974	-3326 (-13%)
Politics & law	7338	6984	4225	3830	-395 (-9%)
Sports	282	297	180	325	+145 (+81%)
Arts	2755	3657	3862	3587	-275 (-7%)
Total	116,504	137,470	153,402	191,147	+37745 (+25%)

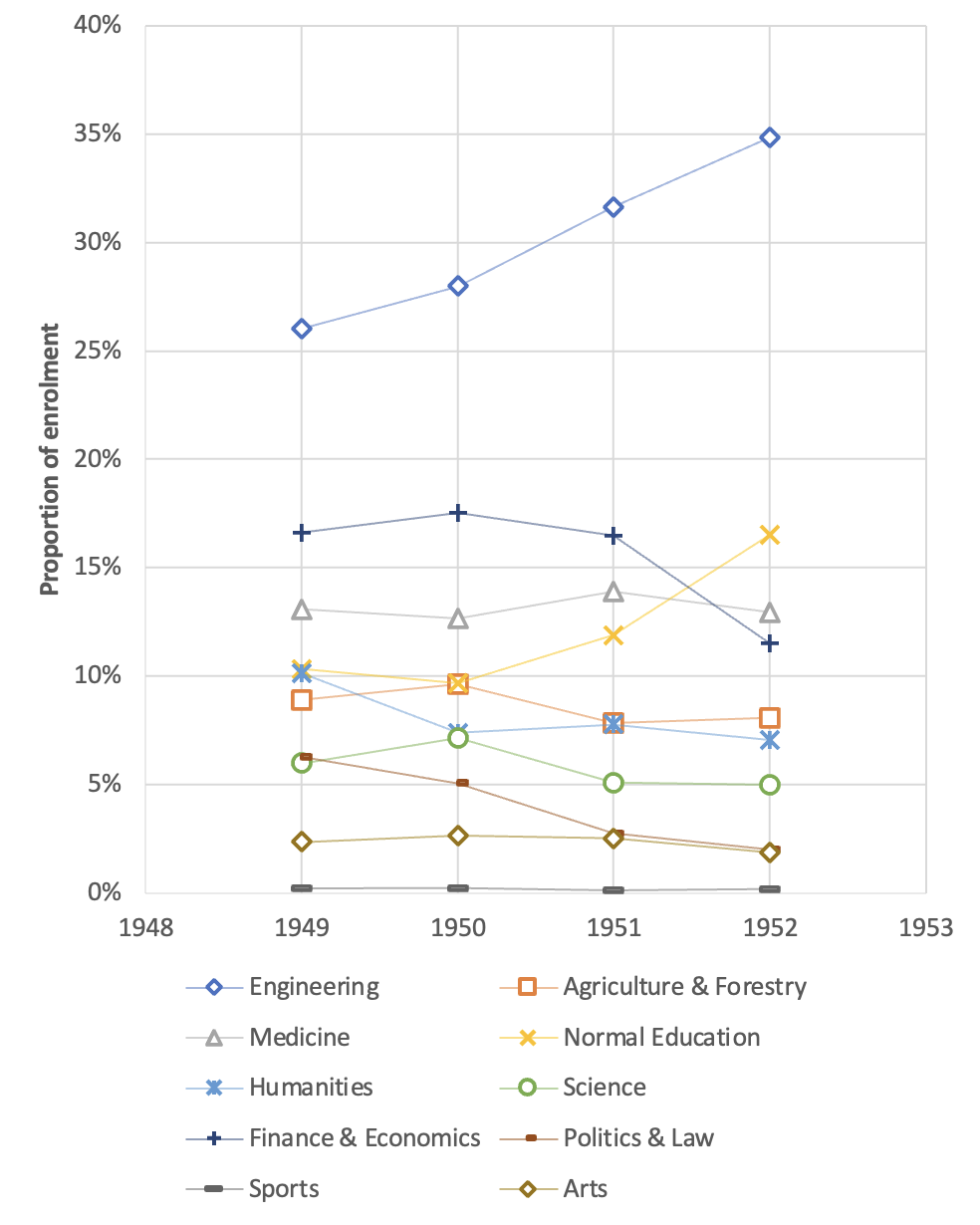
Change of student enrolment from 1949 to 1952

As the whole higher education system prioritised the training of scientists, technicians and teachers, the number of universities in China reduced from 211 to 183, among which there were 14 comprehensive universities, 39 engineering-focused universities, 31 normal universities, 29 agriculture-sepcialised universities in China. New colleges majors were created, including geology, mining and metallurgy, electrical engineering, chemical engineering, civil engineering. Russian was made the first-choice foreign language, rather than English in the past.

The universities were placed under the national economic plans, while the courses which was set to 215 narrowly defined specialisations, which grew to 323 in 1957 in response to manpower need. New colleges majors were created, including geology, mining and metallurgy, electrical engineering, chemical engineering, civil engineering. Meanwhile, as humanities were considered to "be characteristic of bourgeoisie", relevant academic departments and their course offerings were cancelled. The department of sociology at Nanjing University was first merged into the department of politics, which was later closed in 1952. As Zu Qingnian, a Nanjing University professor, complained, after the reorganisation, "the department of philosophy even lost its existence, with young and old scholars all thrown out of the gate of Nanjing University."

=== Regional re-balancing of institutions ===
One of the reasons for the reorganisation was geographic imbalance of higher education, which gravitated in major cities in coastal China, such as Beijing and Shanghai. During the reorganisation, relocation of the faculty, student bodies and the facilities occurred not only across higher education institutions but also across geographic regions. Among 502 academic departments moved out of a university, 282 were relocated to a different city, while among 623 departments moved in, 333 were from a different city.

According to the reorganisation plan made by the Ministry of Education, each greater administrative area should only had 1-4 comprehensive universities to train researchers and teachers and 1-3 normal universities to train senior high school teachers. Each province can establish teachers school to train junior high school teachers. Within each area, there should be more specialised engineering schools rather than comprehensive ones. Therefore, Peking University, Nankai University, Fudan University, Nanjing University, Shandong University, Northeast People's University, Sun Yat-sen University and Wuhan University were reserved as the national comprehensive university, while their regional competitors, Tsinghua University, Nanjing Institute of Technology, Chongqing University, Jiao Tong University, Tongji University and Zhejiang University were transformed into engineering-focused universities.

=== Closure of missionary universities ===
Prior to the Korean War the major issue had been readjustment. After that it was survival.

— Philip West, Yenching University and Sino-Western Relations, 1916–1952

In 1952, missionary universities were dissolved, due to the Korean War. All the names of mission-related and private Chinese institutions were discarded. The campus and academic departments were handed over separately to other universities. The campus of Fu Jen Catholic University was handed over to Beijing Normal University. Peking University moved into the campus of Yenching University as its main campus today. The University of Nanking was taken over by Nanjing University. The University of Shanghai campus was handed over to the Shanghai Institute of Mechanical Technology, which was later renamed to the University of Shanghai for Science and Technology in 1996. Zhejiang Normal College, Jiangsu Normal College, Fujian Normal College and Central China Normal College were founded anew on the basis of Hangchow University, Soochow University, Hwa Nan College and Huachung University, respectively. The campus of Cheeloo University was taken up by the newly founded Shandong Medical College.As all private education in China was ordered to close in 1952, Christian colleges and universities were therefore forced to shut down, with teachers and students fleeing mainland China to Hong Kong, Taiwan and Southeast Asia to continue providing Christian education to Chinese people.

== Reorganisation details by region ==
Greater administrative areas of China in the 1950s

The 1952 reorganisation mainly focused on North and East China. The university reorganisation was further implemented in South Central China in 1953. Most of the reorganisation, except for that for agricultural colleges and medical colleges, was concluded by the end of 1953. After the reorganisation, there were 182 higher education institutions in China. Among the institutions, there were 14 comprehensive universities, 38 engineering schools, 31 normal colleges, 29 medical colleges, six finance and economics-specialised colleges, four politics and law-specialised colleges, eight foreign languages universities, 15 fine arts school, four colleges for physical education and 4 colleges for ethnical minorities. Around three fourths of the universities in China were involved in the reorganisation.

=== North China ===
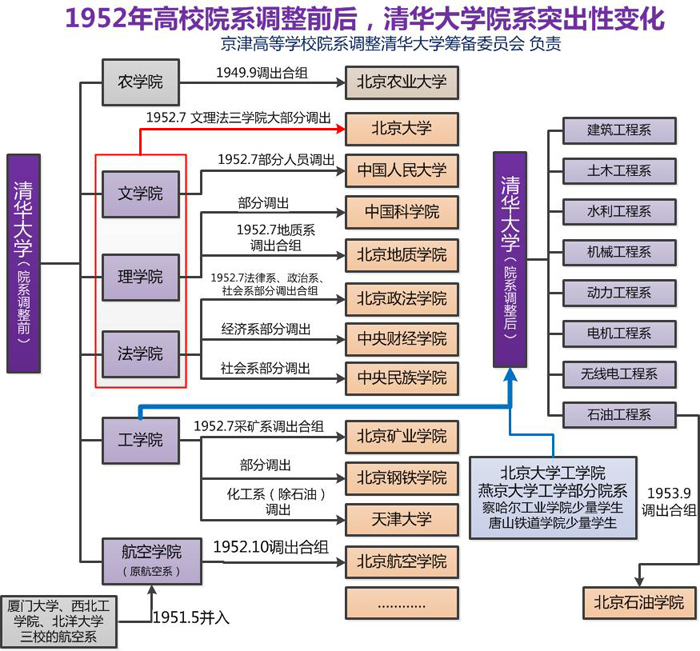
After the reorganisation, Tsinghua University became a multi-discipline engineering-focused university with only eight academic departments left.

Tsinghua University was a main target of the reorganisation in North China, due to its historical tie with the United States. Prior to the reorganisation, Tsinghua University has five colleges in humanities, law, science, engineering and agriculture. The colleges of humanities, science and law merged into Peking University. Only the academic departments under the former College of Engineering was left, which was merged with engineering departments from Yenching University and Peking University. The Departments of Chemical Engineering at Nankai University, Tsin Ku University, Tsinghua University, Peking University, Yenching University and Tangshan Institute of Railway, as well as the Department of Architectural Engineering at Beijing Institute of Railway went into Tianjin University. The mining-related departments at Tsinghua University, Tianjin University and Tangshan Institute of Railway went into China College of Mining and Technology in Tianjin.

The Departments of Mathematics and Physics at Tianjin University went into Nankai University. The geology-related departments at Peking University, Tsinghua University, Tangshan Institute of Railway and Northwest University jointly formed Beijing Institute of Geology. The smelting-related departments at Tianjin University, Tangshan Institute of Railway, Tsinghua University, Northwest Industrial College, Shanxi University, and the Institute of Technology North China University jointly formed Beijing Institute of Steel and Iron Industry. The aeronautics departments at Tsinghua University, Tianjin University, Northwest Industrial College, Xiamen University, the Institute of Technology North China University, Southwest School of Industry, Sichuan University and Yunnan University jointly formed Beijing Institute of Aeronautics. Beijing Institute of Petroleum was formed on the relevant departments at Tianjin University, Peking University, Tsinghua University.

There was a designated area for the newly founded eight top technical colleges in the northwest of Beijing, which included Beijing Medical College, Beijing Institute of Aeronautics, Beijing Institute of Steel and Iron Industry, Beijing Institute of Geology, Beijing Institute of Petroleum, Beijing Institute of Mining and Technology, Beijing Institute of Agricultural Mechanization and Beijing Institute of Forestry. These universities became known as the "Eight Colleges", and enjoys academic reputation in their respective academic discipline.

=== East China ===
The reorganisation in East China focused on Shanghai and Nanjing. The national plan for the 1952 reorganisation was sent out to the universities in Shanghai in July 1952. A specialised committee, namely East China Regional Higher Education Adjustment Committee (Chinese: 华东地区高等学校院系调整委员会), was formed on 2 August, with the finalised reorganisation plan for the region published in mid-August.

Nanjing University, which used to be National Central University under the Nationalist government, was the main target of the reorganisation, as it had a strong historical and political association with the Nationalists. Thus, a new Nanjing University was founded on the basis of the Colleges of Humanities and Sciences, the College of Humanities and Science of the University of Nanking, and the Department of Astronomy of Sun Yat-sen University, the Geography research group at Zhejiang University, the German research group at Fudan University, the Foreign Languages research group at Tongji University, the French research group at Aurora University and the Department of Astronomy of Cheeloo University on the campus of the University of Nanking. The Teachers College of Nanjing University went independent as Nanjing Normal College and merged with relevant academic divisions from the University of Nanking. The East China Aeronautics Institute was formed on the basis of the Departments of Aeronautics at Nanjing University, Zhejiang University and Jiao Tong University and later moved to Xi'an and formed Northwestern Polytechnical University. A new East China Technical University of Water Resources was formed on the basis of the Departments of Hydraulic Engineering of Nanjing University, Zhejiang University and Jiao Tong University. The remaining departments under the College of Engineering of Nanjing University remained at the original campus of Nanjing University and became Nanjing Institute of Technology. The Medical School of Nanjing University became an independent Fifth Military Medical University, which was later merged into Fourth Military Medical University. The Department of Philosophy merged with the corresponding department at Peking University in Beijing. The Departments of Law and Politics went into East China College of Political Science and Law in Shanghai.

Zhejiang University was ordered to reserve only five academic departments. The Departments of Electrical Engineering and Chemical Engineering of Zhejiang University remained unchanged, while the Departments of Mechanical Engineering and Civil Engineering were joined with corresponding departments at Hangchow University. The Departments of Mathematics, Physics, Chemistry, Biology and Anthropology went into Fudan University. The Department of Geography went into East China Normal University. The College of Agriculture went independent as Zhejiang Agricultural College. The Department of Pharmacology went into Shanghai First Medical College. The Hydraulic Engineering department at Zhejiang University went into East China Technical University of Water Resources.

In Shanghai, the Committee decided to keep only four universities among all 14 institutions planned. Fudan University was selected as the comprehensive university of the region, Jiao Tong University was the engineering university, Tongji University specialised in civil engineering and architecture and East China Normal University was set to train high school teachers in the region. Shanghai Second Medical College, East China College of Chemical Engineering, East China College of Political Sciences and Law, East China College of Sports and Shanghai Russian College was newly formed in the reorganisation. The rest of the 11 technical colleges included Shanghai Medical College, East China Institute of Textile Technology, Shanghai Fisheries College, Shanghai Navigation College, Shanghai College of Finance and Economics, East China Branch of China Conservatory of Music, the East China branch of Chinese Conservatory of Music and the East China branch of Central Academy of Drama, in addition to a vocational college named East China Jiaotong College.

=== Central and South China ===
In Guangzhou, Sun Yat-sen University was reduced to only its colleges of humanities, science and law and a comprehensive research institute, merging with the colleges of humanities and science at South China Associated University and Lingnan University and moving into the campus of Lingnan University. On the site of Sun Yat-sen University, a new South China Institute of Technology was formed on the basis of the Colleges of Engineering of Sun Yat-sen University, South China Associated University, the College of Science and Engineering of Lingnan University and Guangdong Industrial School, with the engineering departments from Hunan University, Chunghua University, Wuhan Transportation College, Nanchang University and Guangxi University. The Colleges of Agriculture of Sun Yat-sen University and Lingnan University, plus the Departments of Veterinary Medicine and Plant Protection formed a new South China College of Agriculture. The medical schools of Sun Yat-sen University and Lingnan University formed South China Medical College. The Teachers College of Sun Yat-sen University went independent as South China Normal College and merged with Guangdong College of Arts and Science and the Department of Education of South China Associated University.

== Aftermaths and epilogue ==
Nanjing University, Zhejiang University, Xiamen University, Wuhan University and Sun Yat-sen University were called "Five Mother Universities" after the university reorganisation, as the reorganisation sent off a large number of their academic divisions, weakening their academic strengths. For example, Nanjing University was divided into Nanjing University, Nanjing Institute of Technology, Nanjing Agricultural College, Nanjing Normal College. Nanjing University was relocated to the site of Ginling College, with its original campus taken up by Nanjing Institute of Technology. Similarly, Zhejiang University was divided into Zhejiang University, Zhejiang Normal College, Zhejiang Agricultural College and Zhejiang Medical College, with its own campus given to Zhejiang Agricultural University. After the reorganisation, Shanxi University, Nanchang University, Henan University, Guangxi University and Yunnan University, which were once regionally known universities, were no longer considered among prestigious universities, while the academics of Fudan University was significantly strengthened.

=== Purge and suppression of dissents ===
Bourgeois Rightists are the bourgeois reactionaries mentioned above who oppose the Communist Party, the people and socialism; this definition is scientific and true to fact. [...]They are very small in number, but in the democratic parties, and particularly in certain of these parties, they carry weight and should not be taken lightly. This bunch have not only expressed themselves in words but also followed up with deeds; they are guilty, and the principle of "blame not the speaker" does not apply to them.

— Mao Zedong, Wen Hui Pao's Bourgeois Orientation Should Be Criticized, published in People's Daily, 1 July 1957

The Thought Reform campaign starting in the fall of 1950 disabused university faculty members of any possibility of their ideas of the education being accepted by the new government. Thus, there was no significant protest against the reorganisation. However, following the death of Joseph Stalin in 1956, the new Soviet leader Nikita Khrushchev delivered his "secret speech" criticising Stalinism, which shocked the Chinese Communist Party. Meanwhile, the collectivisation was resisted by the farmers and workers nationwide. Thus, Mao Zedong launched the Hundred Flowers campaign to allow intellectuals to express their criticism towards the Communist policies, during which university professors spoke out against the reorganisation.

The China Democratic League was a party mostly formed by university professors and scholars, who hated autocracy and dictatorship. During the Hundred Flowers campaign, several members of the Democratic League proposed their suggestions on political reforms. Meanwhile, Mao ordered higher education institutions and democratic parties to organise talks in which they were allowed to express their criticism. As Mao said, "it is the best to allow the reactionary professors, teachers and teaching assistants to spit the toxin and talk as much as they want". Thus, the Anti-Rightist Movement that followed soon convicted those who spoke out. Thus, the government gained total control over the higher education system.

In Nanjing University, a university-wide meeting was held in June 1957 to criticise so-called rightist thoughts, which mostly echoed the nationwide debates. The notion of the bureaucracy, sectarianism and subjectivism as a result of the current social institution, the advocacy of university autonomy rather than the Party leadership, the appeal for redefining political campaigns as anti-human rights cases, and the discontent with the 1952 higher education reorganisation all came under criticism. In Beijing, the municipal committee of the Communist Party claimed that there were 4874 rightists founded in 32 higher education institutions. However, the so-called rightists also included people who expressed their disagreement with the current policy or proposed radical suggestions. For example, Chen Jianren, the Party secretary of Nanjing University, was also recognised as a rightist and removed from his office, due to his opposition to the movement and was tortured to death in 1967.

=== Criticism of John Dewey's pragmatism ===
While the Soviet education theory was introduced to China, John Dewey's education theory, which was once popular in China due to his book Democracy and Education, came under attack. Tao Xingzhi, who was hailed as the "people's educator" by the Communist media upon his death in 1946, also came under attack due to Dewey's influence on his education thoughts in 1950. Although John Dewey actually shared the belief in the unity of theory and practice with Karl Marx, the Communist government attempted to remove his influence in China. The critics against John Dewey later targeted Hu Shih, another student of Dewey, in 1954 and 1955. According to Hu Shih, in the years of 1954 and 1955 alone, the Communist media wrote numerous articles with some three million words in total to criticise him, and each of the article also targeted John Dewey's education theory.

=== 1955-57 relocation to inland China ===
After the 1952 reorganisation, most universities still gravitated in major coastal Chinese cities. In 1955, there were 97 higher education institutions, around a half of the higher education institutions, located in 17 coastal Chinese cities, including Beijing, Tianjin, Nanjing, Shanghai, Hangzhou and Guangzhou, where 61.5% of Chinese college students were studying. Thus, the government further proposed that universities in coastal China should move to the inland and the existing universities in the inland should be strengthened. The government planned to relocate three universities from the coastal region to the West and to found 17 new universities in inland China and upgrade an existing institution as higher education institution. Thus, a number of industrial colleges specialised in topography, petroleum science, architecture, telecommunications, chemical engineering and power engineering were founded in Wuhan, Lanzhou, Xi'an and Chengdu, among which there were Chengdu Institute of Radio Engineering and Chongqing Medical College.

As there were more than enough universities in East China but there was a lack of engineering higher education resources in Western China, in 1955, Jiao Tong University and East China Institute of Aeronautics in Shanghai was further ordered to relocate to Xi'an. However, this plan was not fully implemented due to resistance from the students and faculty, which led to the split of Jiao Tong University into Shanghai Jiaotong University and Xi'an Jiaotong University. After the 1955-57 reorganisation, the number of universities and colleges in Shanghai was further reduced to 19, significantly fewer than 43 in 1949.

=== University amalgamation since 1980s ===
As the Chinese government abandoned the Soviet education system in the 1980s, the universities and colleges impacted by the reorganisation began to reverse the impact, which led to a wave of university amalgamation since the 1980s and 1990s, as the universities tried to transform from engineering-focused institutions to more comprehensive universities. Thus, a new Zhejiang University was formed on the basis of Zhejiang University, Hangzhou University, Zhejiang Agricultural University and Zhejiang Medical University. Wuhan University merged with Wuhan University of Water Resources and Hydropower Engineering, Wuhan Technical University of Surveying and Mapping and Hubei Medical University. Sun Yat-sen University merged with Sun Yat-sen University of Medical Sciences. Jiangnan University and Soochow University, which were cancelled after the 1952 reorganisation, were re-established in the 1990s through the amalgamation of local universities.
