= Soochow University (Taipei) =

Private university in Taipei, Taiwan, originally founded in Suzhou, China

Coordinates: 25°05′43″N 121°32′44″E

- 東吳大學 (Chinese)
- Motto: 養天地正氣 法古今完人
- Motto in English: Unto A Full Grown Man
- Type: Private
- Established: Founded 1900, "Reactivated" 1951
- Affiliations: ACUCA; U12 Consortium; United Board
- President: Chan Chien-lung
- Faculty: 448 full-time, 747 part-time
- Students: 15,209
- Location: Taipei City, Taiwan
- Campus: Semi-rural, 37.5 acres (0.152 km^{2})
- Mascot: None
- Website: www.scu.edu.tw (in English)

Chinese name
- Traditional Chinese: 東吳大學
- Simplified Chinese: 东吴大学
Transcriptions
Standard Mandarin
- Hanyu Pinyin: Dōngwú Dàxué
- Bopomofo: ㄉㄨㄥ ㄨˊ ㄉㄚˋ ㄒㄩㄝˊ
- Gwoyeu Romatzyh: Dongwu Dahshyue
- Wade–Giles: Tung^{1}-wu^{2} Ta^{4}-hsüeh^{2}
- Tongyong Pinyin: Dong-wú Dà-syué
- IPA: [tʊ́ŋ.ǔ tâ.ɕɥě]

Soochow University (Chinese: 東吳大學; pinyin: Dōngwú Dàxué) is a private research university in Taipei, Taiwan.

== History ==
The original Soochow University was founded by Methodists in Suzhou, Jiangsu, Qing dynasty, in 1900 as a merger of three institutions: the Buffington Institute and the Kung Hang School in the city of Soochow (now spelled Suzhou), in Jiangsu Province, and the Anglo-Chinese College in Shanghai.

After the Chinese Civil War, members of the Soochow Alumni Association who fled to Taiwan established a new institution there in 1951. A law school was opened in 1954, and a full university was certified in 1971.

Meanwhile in Suzhou, the original university merged with the Southern Jiangsu College of Culture and Education and the Department of Mathematics and Physics at Jiangnan University to form the Jiangsu Teacher's College in 1952, which revived the name Soochow University in 1982. However, while the English names are identical, the one in Suzhou uses the Chinese name 蘇州 (Soochow), not the original 東吳 (Tung-wu).

The campus is home to the tomb of the prominent Chinese politician and diplomat Wang Ch'unghui, who fled to Taiwan after the establishment of the People's Republic of China in 1949.

In 2014, the Japan–Taiwan Exchange Association listed Soochow University as one of the seven well-known Taiwanese universities.

== Academics ==
=== Publications ===
In 1981, the first joint-issued class-made magazine, completely founded by students, called Xu Ai, appeared in Soochow University. Students voiced political opinions as to temporal society, but the magazine was quickly banned by the strong commend of the college.

However, the next year, the political students published another critical magazine, Monthly Political Magazine of Soochow University. It was banned, a result from publishing an advertisement of Shen Geng, which was a magazine of the Chinese Nationalist Party control.

On 9 September 1982, the Academic Conference of Political Department organized an audit for second year students about Taipei City Council. But the lead teacher Huang Erxuan was charged by leading a group of students to the council to listen the interpolation produced by the outside party senator. He was fired the next year.

=== Ranking ===
Soochow University (Taiwan) rankings

Global – Overall
- QS World: 1401+ (2024)

Regional – Overall
- QS Asia: 551–600 (2024)

== Excellent Long-Established University Consortium of Taiwan ==
Soochow University is a member of the Excellent Long-Established University Consortium of Taiwan (ELECT), which is an organization devoted to inter-school cooperation and sharing resources between schools. The twelve union universities were all founded over half a century with each of their own strengths covering professional fields of science and technology, commerce, agronomy, medicine, media, law, education, art and design, etc. These schools allow students to have multiple options, cross-domain learning and a broader adaptive development for their education.

== Campus ==
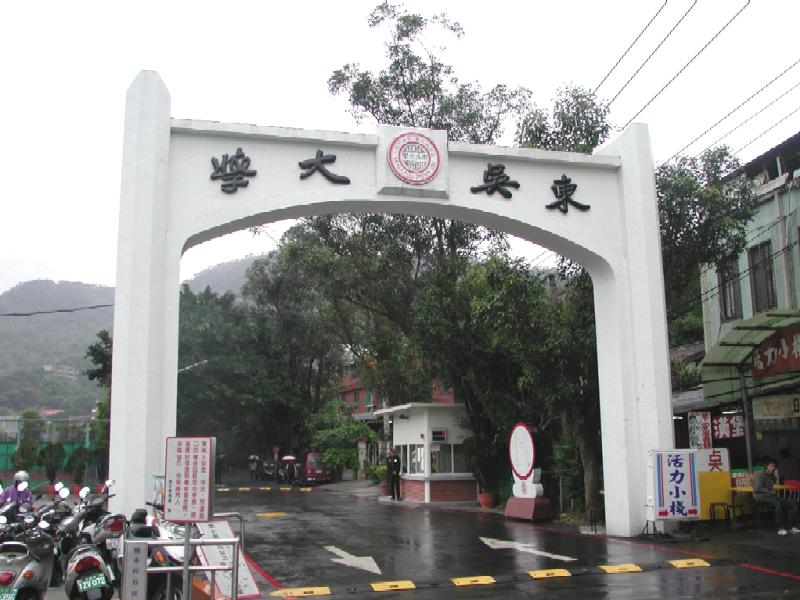
Front entrance of Main Campus

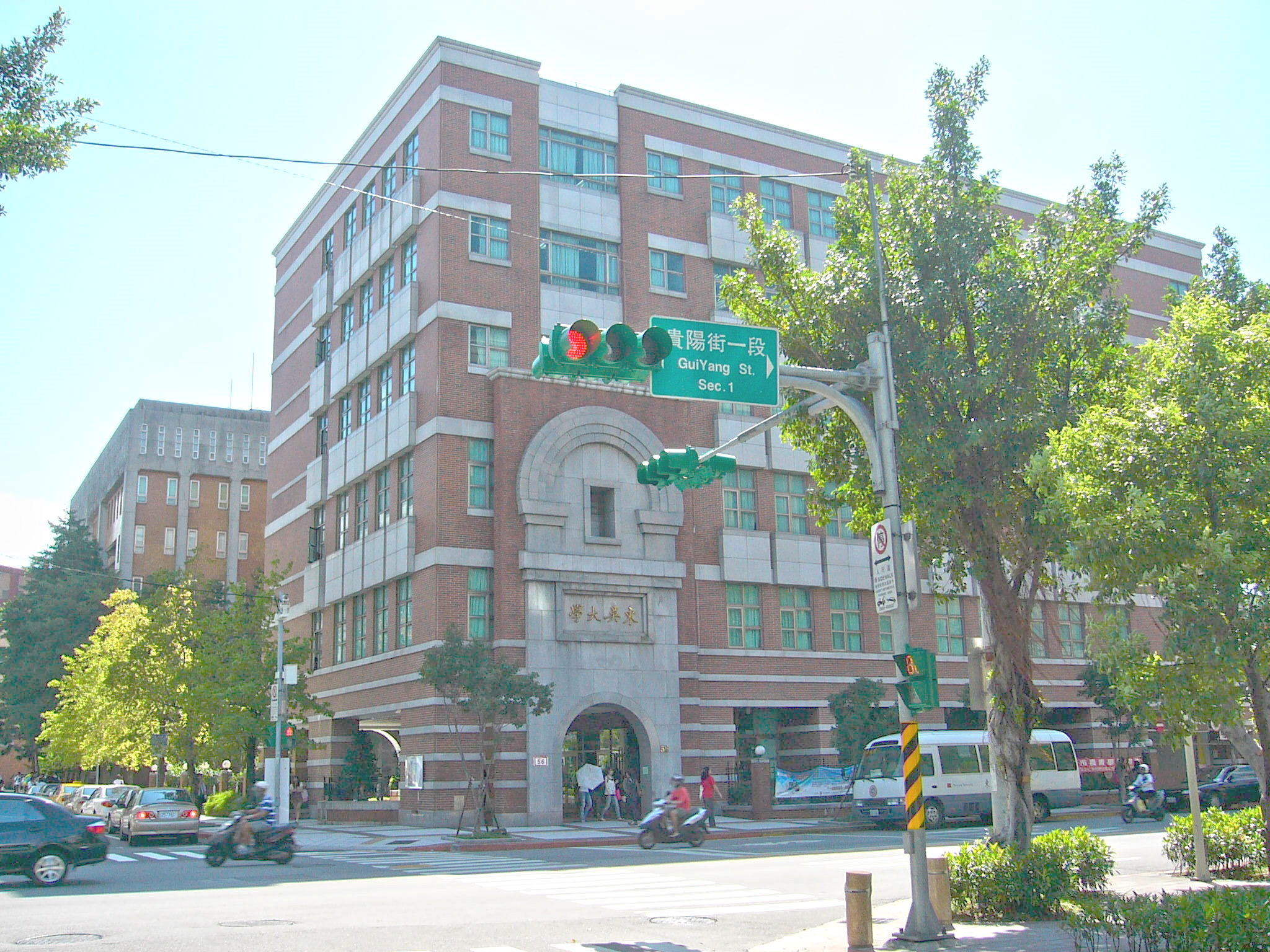
Front entrance of Downtown Campus

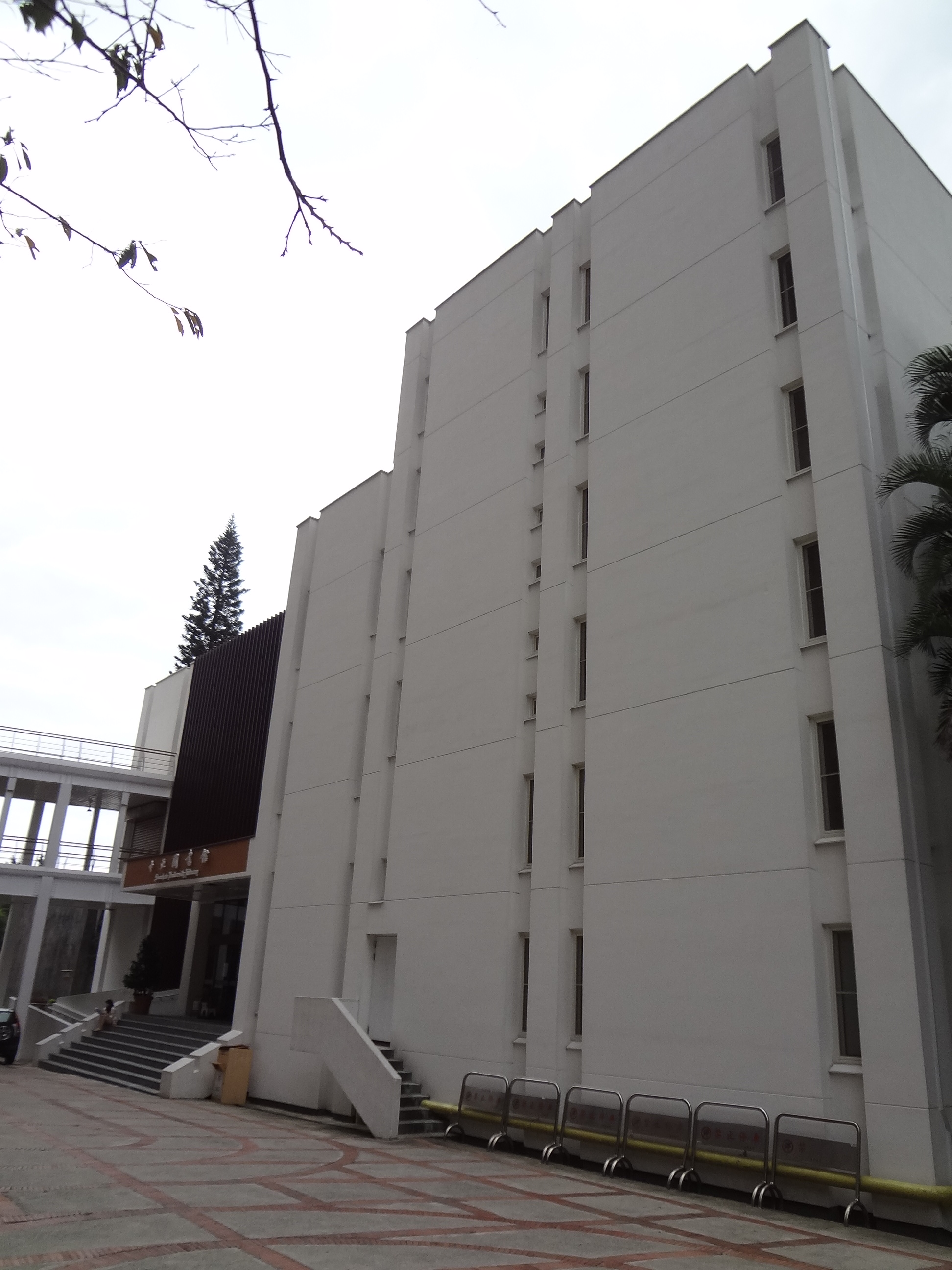
Zhongzheng Campus Library

Soochow University in Taiwan has two branches: a downtown branch near the Republic of China (ROC) presidential office in Taipei's Zhongzheng district and the main campus near the National Palace Museum in Taipei's Shilin district. The law and business colleges are in the downtown campus. All other colleges are located in the main campus.

=== Shilin Campus ===
The Shilin Campus is in the mountainous terrain of the Shilin District.

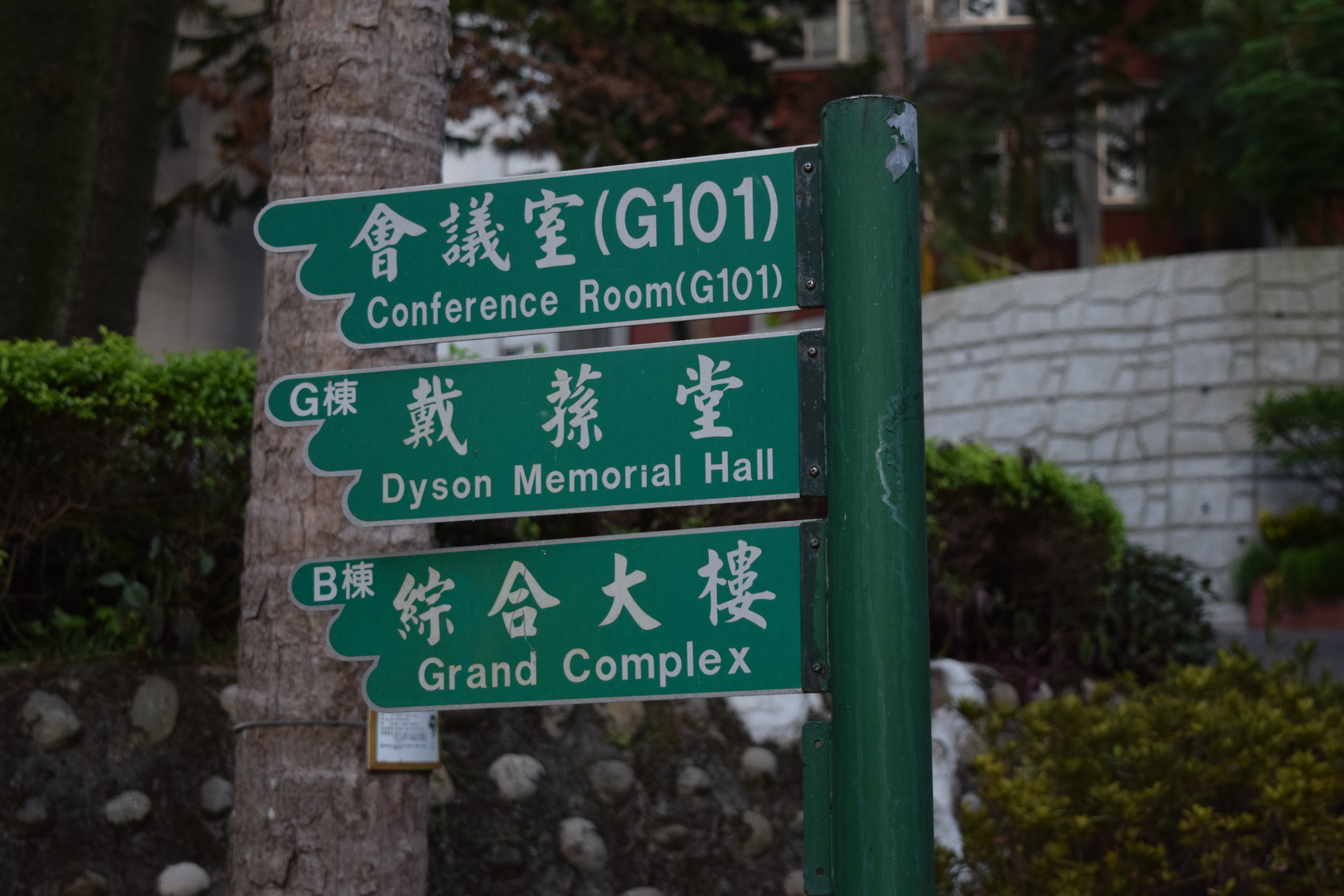
The Shilin campus is marked by signs in Chinese and English.

Faculty and student housing are available on the main campus although they cannot meet demand. There are three female student dorms and two male student dorms with a total occupancy of 1,500. Many students commute to campus by bus and the subway system.

=== Downtown Campus ===
The Downtown Campus is in the Zhongzheng District.

== Organization ==
Taiwan's first private university is headed by a president and a board of trustees. The University is divided into six schools or colleges, each having a variety of departments:

=== School of Arts and Social Science ===
- Department of Chinese Literature
- Department of History
- Department of Philosophy
- Department of Political Science
- Department of Sociology
- Department of Social Work
- Department of Music
- Center for Teacher Education

=== School of Foreign Language and Culture ===
- Department of English Language and Literature
- Department of Japanese Language and Literature
- Department of German Language and Literature
- Language Center

=== School of Science ===
- Department of Mathematics
- Department of Physics
- Department of Chemistry
- Department of Microbiology
- Department of Psychology

=== School of Law ===
- Department of Law
- Civil Law Research Center
- Criminal Law Research Center
- Public Law Research Center
- Anglo-American Law Research Center
- Liang Yunli International Law Research Center
- Financial and Economic Law Research Center
- Fundamental Law Research Center
- Science and Technology & Intellectual Property Law Research Center
- China Mainland Law Research Center
- Tax Law Research Center
- Medical Law Research Center
- Border Management Law Research Center
- Law and Religion Research Center
- Engineering Law Research Center
- Ethnic Law Research Center
- Artificial Intelligence Law Research Center
- Sports and Recreation Law Research Center
- Environment and Energy Law Research Center

=== School of Business ===
- Department of Financial Engineering and Actuarial Mathematics
- Department of Economics
- Department of Accounting
- Department of Business Administration
- Department of International Business
- Department of Computer and Information Science
- Undergraduate Program of Business

== Sports ==
Sports play an important role in campus life. The downtown campus has tennis and basketball courts. The main campus has indoor and outdoor basketball courts, tennis courts, a race track, a mini rock climbing wall, and a field that is used for softball and soccer. Each year the university holds two major student athletic events.

Much of the sports facilities on the main campus are on land owned by the Taipei city government rather than by the university. The city government has considered reclaiming the land to build an expressway but has decided to back off with this project.

== Clubs ==
The university has 183 student clubs or societies, such as Association for Diplomacy Research (SCU A.D.R.).

== Traditions ==
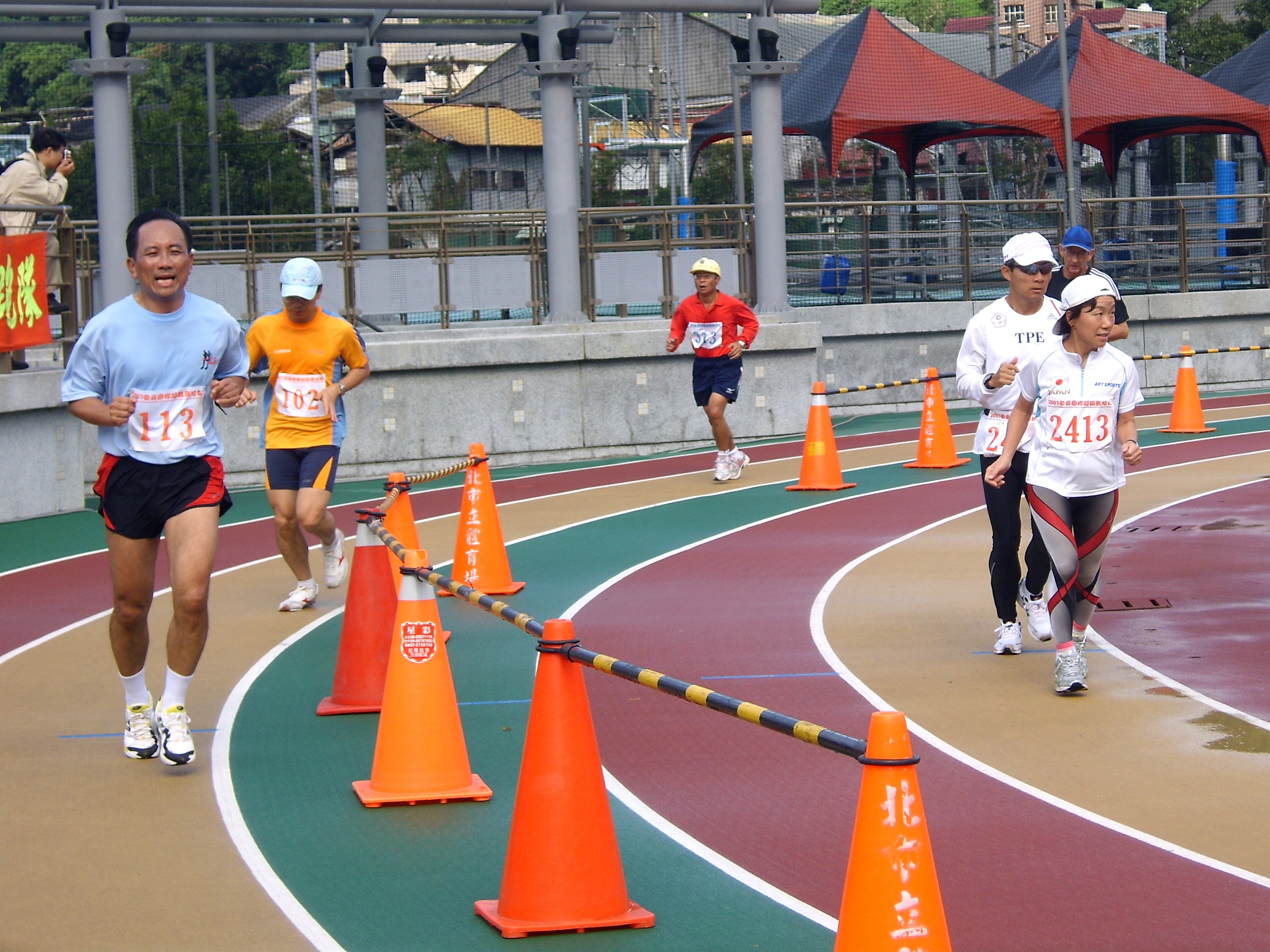
The Ultramarathon

- 24-hour International Ultramarathon: Runners from several countries, students, faculty, and celebrities such as Ryoichi Sekiya and Mami Kudo participate in this annual event. Only very few of the contestants venture running for the entire duration of the marathon. Portable toilets are set up near the race track with one or two toilets reserved for certain internationally renowned runners. Some spectators set up tents near the track and camp the entire night watching the marathon.
- Campus Christmas Carol: Students from the music department visit the faculty residential apartment complexes sing Christmas carols on Christmas Eve. Having people singing carols in the neighborhood is a rare sight in Taiwan since Christians make up a small minority of the population.

== Notable alumni ==
- Chen Chih-ching, Minister of Council of Agriculture (2016)
- Han Kuo-yu, mayor of Kaohsiung
- Jeffrey Koo Sr. (1957), businessman
- John Chiang, Vice Chairperson of Kuomintang (2008–2014)
- John Deng, Minister of Economic Affairs (2014–2016)
- Kevin Chu, film director
- Mandy Wei, actress, model and host
- Illy Wang, YouTuber, model
- Shih Jun-ji, Vice Premier of the Republic of China
- Chiang Wei-kuo, Son of Chiang Kai-Shek
- Shyu Jong-shyong, Deputy Secretary-General of Executive Yuan (2015–2016)
- Sun Lih-chyun, spokesperson of Executive Yuan
- Tseng Chung-ming, Deputy Minister of Health and Welfare (2013-2015)
- Winston Chang, President of the Soochow University (1992–1996)
- Hsu Shu-hsiang, President of the Transworld Institute of Technology (2006–)
- Shieh Jhy-wey, Taiwan's Representative to Germany (Taipeh Vertretung in der Bundesrepublik Deutschland; 2005.5 –); Dean of the School of Foreign Languages of Soochow University (1996–2002)
- Members of the Legislative Yuan: Chang Hung-lu, Chang Show-foong, Hung Chao-nan; Chang Ching-fang; Hsu Chung-hsiung; Cheng Kuei-lien; Lin Hsu Shao-ping; Cheng San-yuan; Hsu Yuan-kuo

== School presidents ==
- David L. Anderson (1901–1911)
- John W. Cline (1911–1922)
- Walter B. Nance (1922–1927)
- Yang Yongqing (1927–1949)
- Qiu Hanping (1951–1952)
- Shih Jiyan (1952–1954)
- Chen Ting-ruei (1954–1955)
- Tsao Wen-yen (1955–1957)
- Shih Chao-yung (1957–1968)
- Kuei Chung-gee (1968–1969)
- Joseph K. Twanmoh (1969–1983)
- Edward Yang (1983–1992)
- Winston Chang (1992–1996)
- Liu Yuan-tsun (1996–2004)
- Liu Chao-shiuan (2004–2008)
- Huang Chen-tai (2008–2011)
- Pan Wei-ta (2012–2024)
- Chan Chien-lung (since 2024)

== Noted faculty ==
- Liu Chao-shiuan: former president of the university and former Premier of the Republic of China

== See also ==
- List of universities in Taiwan
  - List of schools in the Republic of China reopened in Taiwan
- U12 Consortium
