= Soochow University =

Soochow University or Suzhou University may refer to:

- Soochow University (1900–1952) (東吳大學), a defunct Methodist university in Suzhou, Jiangsu, China
- Soochow University (Taipei) (東吳大學), a private university in Taipei, Taiwan
- Soochow University (Suzhou) (苏州大学), a provincial public university in Suzhou, Jiangsu, China
- Suzhou University (Anhui) (宿州学院), a provincial public college in Suzhou, Anhui, China

== See also ==
- Suzhou University of Technology, a provincial public college in Changshu, Jiangsu, China
- Suzhou University of Science and Technology, a provincial public university in Suzhou, Jiangsu, China
