= First Affiliated Hospital of Soochow University =

Hospital in Suzhou, Jiangsu, China

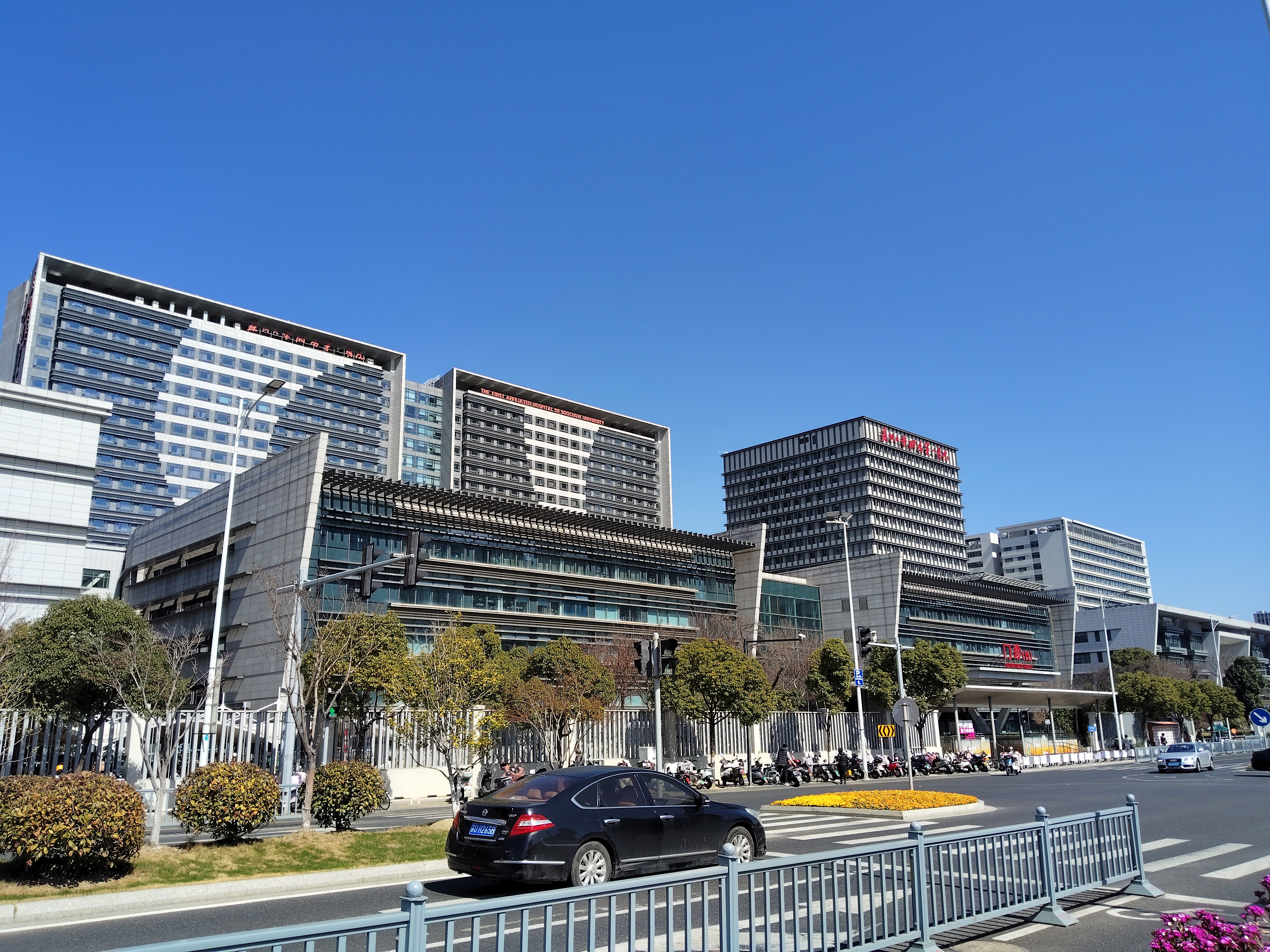
The First Affiliated Hospital of Soochow University, Pingjiang New Town Campus

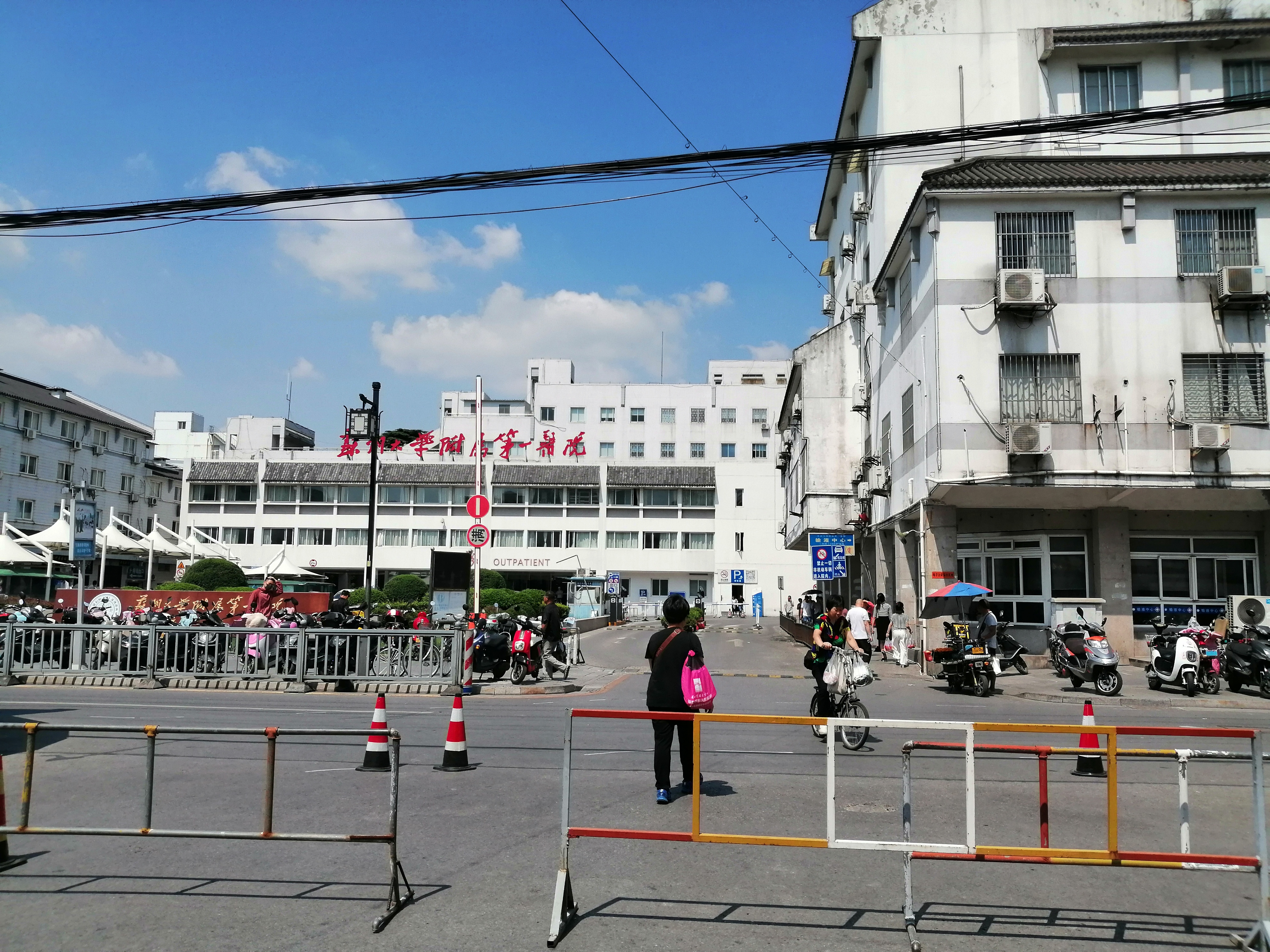
The First Affiliated Hospital of Soochow University, Shizi Street Campus

The First Affiliated Hospital of Soochow University (Chinese: 苏州大学附属第一医院), also called "Suzhou First People's Hospital", is a hospital in Suzhou, Jiangsu Province, China. Founded by the American Methodist Episcopal in 1883, the hospital is now one of the first batch of Grade A tertiary hospitals of the Ministry of Health of China, a provincial key hospital directly under the Jiangsu Provincial Health Commission, and the medical guidance center of southern Jiangsu. The hospital has ranked first in the list of Top 100 Hospitals in China's Prefecture-level Cities for years running.

== History ==
In 1883, (i.e., the ninth year of the Guangxu reign of the Qing Dynasty), the "Soochow Hospital" (Chinese name "苏州博习医院", in memory of donator Buffington ) was founded by the American Methodist Episcopal. It was managed by two American doctors, Blake and Randall. There were 30 beds and Blake was its first president.

In 1917, American surgeon John Abner Snell took over as the president and expanded the hospital with more than 200,000 silver dollars donated by various parties. In 1922, the hospital was expanded to 100 beds.

In 1927, Li Guangxun (李广勋) became the first Chinese president of the hospital.

After the outbreak of the Pacific War, the Hospital was taken over by the Japanese. After Japan's surrender in 1945, it was taken back by the church.

In November 1951, the Jiangsu Provincial Southern Administrative Office took over the Hospital, and in 1954 it was renamed "Suzhou First People's Hospital".

In 1957, the hospital became an affiliated hospital of Suzhou Medical College, and in 1959 it was renamed "Suzhou Medical College First Affiliated Hospital".

In 1979, Suzhou Medical College First Affiliated Hospital and Suzhou First People's Hospital became one institution with two names.

In 1994, the hospital became one of the first Grade A tertiary hospitals in Jiangsu Province.

In 2000, Suzhou Medical College merged into Soochow University, and the hospital was renamed the "First Affiliated Hospital of Soochow University".

On August 28, 2015, the new main campus of the First Affiliated Hospital of Soochow University was put into use.

== Current situation ==
The First Affiliated Hospital of Soochow University is one of the first batch of Grade A tertiary hospitals designated by the Ministry of Health, and a medical guidance center for the southern Jiangsu region. There are two campuses: Pingjiang (main) Campus, located on Pinghai Road, Suzhou, and Shizijie Campus located at Shizijie Street.

The hospital has 37 clinical departments and 8 medical technology departments, with 4,435 employees and approximately 3,000 patient beds. In 2018, about 3.8 million patients were treated by the emergency and outpatient departments, 66,000 operations performed, and 156,000 patients were discharges.

The hospital's Hematology Department ranks #4 nationally, Clinical Pharmacy ranks 10. Other strong specialties include Orthopedics, General Surgery, Cardiology, and Neurology.

As the teaching hospital of the Soochow University, the hospital is responsible for the teaching task of graduate, undergraduate and overseas students.

In academic research, the hospital published 98 papers listed in Nature Index for the Time frame of 1 April 2025 - 31 March 2026, ranking 77th globally and 24th in China in healthcare.

The hospital has established partnerships with over 30 universities and medical institutions in the United States, Europe, Japan, Taiwan, Hong Kong, Macao, etc. International patient services are also available.

The hospital ranked 33rd in the 2018 ranking of China's top competitive hospitals. In the list by the Hospital Management Institute of Fudan University, the hospital ranked top 50th nationwide for many years running, and ranked first in the list of Top 100 Hospitals in China's Prefecture-level Cities consecutively.

Address:

- Main campus: NO. 899, Pinghai Road, Suzhou, Jiangsu Province, China
- Shizijie Campus: NO.188, Shizijie Road, Suzhou

== See also ==
- Soochow University (Suzhou)
- List of hospitals in China
