= Medical College of Soochow University =

- 苏州大学医学部; Sūzhōu Dàxué Yīxuébù
- Established: 1912
- Location: Suzhou, China

Medical College of Soochow University (Chinese: 苏州大学医学部; pinyin: Sūzhōu Dàxué Yīxuébù) is the medical college of Soochow University. The college dating back to Nantung Medical Academy founded in 1912 is one of the oldest medical schools in China. It was moved to Suzhou in 1957 and renamed Suzhou Medical College (Chinese: 苏州医学院; pinyin: Sūzhōu Yīxuéyuàn), then the college and Soochow University merged into the new Soochow University in 2000.

The college is well known with three national key disciplines: radiology, haematology and orthopaedics. Besides, it also offers courses in biology and agriculture.

== History ==
The origin of the college could be traced back to (Private) Nantung Medical Academy (私立南通醫學專門學校) established by Zhang Jian in 1912. The academy grew into School of Medicine, (Private) Nantung University later. Since the Second Sino-Japanese War broke out, it was moved west to Yuanling, Hunan, then was restored after 1945. The school was reorganized as the Northern Jiangsu Medical College during the Adjustment of University Colleges & Departments period, the Nantong Medical College later.

In August 1957, the main part of the college was moved to Suzhou, while the rest part retained in Nantong was designated as Nantong Branch, Suzhou Medical College, namely Medical School, Nantong University nowadays.

The college was transferred to the Second Ministry of Machine-Building in 1962. Thereafter it founded the Department of Radiology. As Cultural Revolution took place in 1966, it was suspended from enrolling until 1972.

The college transferred to Jiangsu Provincial Government in 1999, then it was incorporated into Soochow University in the next year.

== Schools ==
- School of Biology & Basic Medical Science
- School of Radiation Medicine and Protection
- School of Public Health
- School of Pharmaceutical Sciences
- School of Nursing
- The 1st Clinical Medical School (The 1st Affiliated Hospital)
- The 2nd Clinical Medical School (The 2nd Affiliated Hospital)
- Clinical Pediatric School

== Presidents or deans ==
=== Nantong period ===
- Zhang Jian

=== Suzhou Medical College period ===
- Liu Tieshan (1959–1966)
- Liu Tieshan (1973–1974)
- Wang Qingren (1974–1980)
- Chen Wangshanji (1980–1983)
- Yin Qizhang (1983–1984)
- Du Ziwei (1984–1993)
- Ruan Changgen (1993–2000)

=== Medical College of Soochow University period ===
- Wu Qingyu (2013–)

== See also ==
- First Affiliated Hospital of Soochow University
- List of medical schools in China
- Soochow University
