= Chu Yuan-Ting =

Chinese ichthyologist and fisheries scientist

Zhu Yuanding
- 朱元鼎
- Born: 2 October 1896; Yin County, Zhejiang, Qing China
- Died: 17 December 1986 (aged 90); Shanghai, China
- Other names: Zhu Jishao (朱继绍); courtesy name Jishao (继绍); art name Jinglin (经霖)
- Education: Soochow University; Cornell University; University of Michigan
- Known for: Pioneering research on Chinese fish taxonomy and marine fish resources
- Scientific career
- Fields: Ichthyology, taxonomy, marine biology, fisheries science
- Workplaces: Shanghai Fisheries College; East China Sea Fisheries Research Institute
- Author abbrev. (zoology): Chu

Zhu Yuanding (Chinese: 朱元鼎; 2 October 1896 – 17 December 1986), also known as Zhu Jishao (朱继绍), was a Chinese ichthyologist, zoologist, and educator. He was one of the principal pioneers of fish taxonomy in China and made significant contributions to the study of Chinese marine fishes and fisheries resources.

== Biography ==
=== Early life and education ===
Zhu was born on 2 October 1896 into a merchant family in Yin County, Zhejiang Province, during the Qing dynasty. His father was Zhu Rongqing (朱榕青).

In 1916, after completing secondary school, Zhu entered Soochow University. During his third year, he was elected president of the university's Liyi Association. In 1919, he published a paper entitled The Economic Value of Algae, marking the beginning of his academic career. He graduated in 1920 with a bachelor's degree in biology. His academic development was influenced by the American professor N. Gist Gee.

Following graduation, Zhu was appointed to the biology department of St. John's University in Shanghai.

=== Studies in the United States and academic career ===
In 1925, Zhu was selected by St. John's University to study in the United States with financial support from the Rockefeller Foundation. He entered the graduate programme at Cornell University, where he studied entomology, and received a Master of Science degree in 1926. After returning to China, he became an associate professor in the biology department at St. John's University. He taught entomology, ichthyology, genetics, evolution, comparative anatomy, and other subjects.

Beginning in 1928, Zhu published four papers on insect taxonomy. He described two new genera and nine new species of stoneflies (order Plecoptera). In 1930, he published his first paper on ichthyology, Bibliography of Chinese Ichthyology.

In 1931, Zhu published 中国鱼类索引 (Index of Chinese Fishes), one of the earliest systematic taxonomic works devoted to the fishes of China.

In 1932, Zhu received further Rockefeller Foundation support to pursue advanced studies in the United States. He enrolled at the University of Michigan, where he studied under the prominent ichthyologist C. C. Hubbs. In February 1934, he received a PhD in biology and returned to China later that year to become a professor at St. John's University.

In 1935, he published a study comparing scales, pharyngeal bones, and teeth in Chinese cyprinid fishes. The work attracted international attention in ichthyological research.

=== Career after the establishment of the People's Republic of China ===
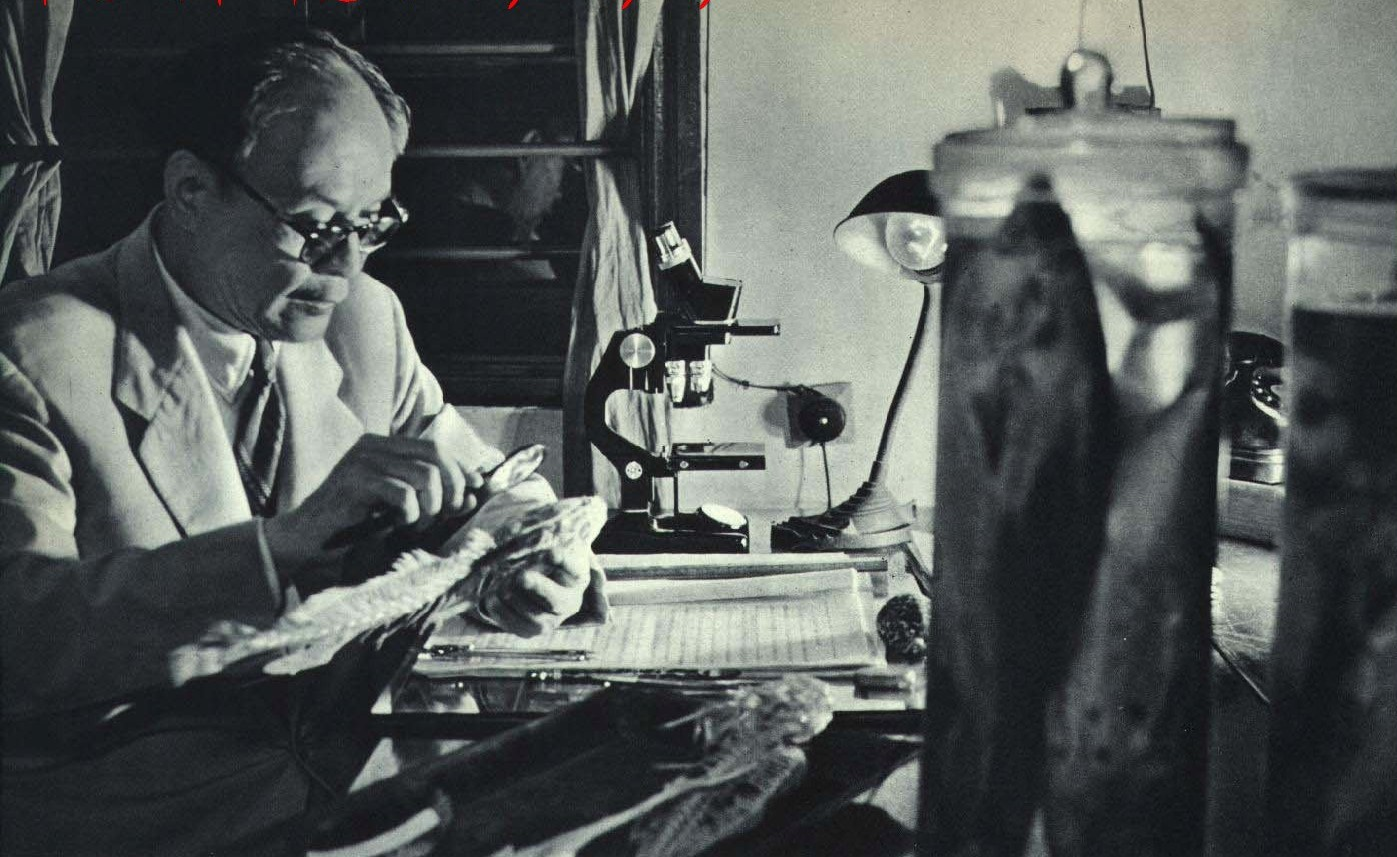
Zhu Yuanding in 1963

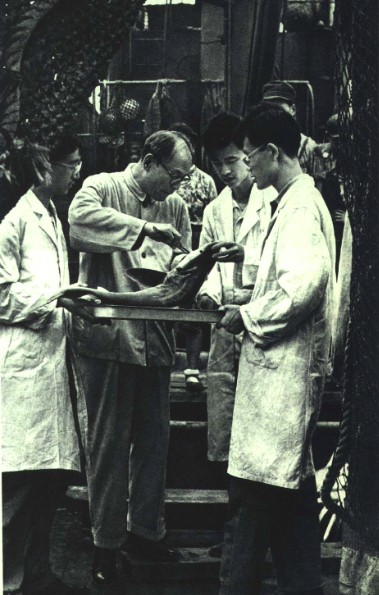
Zhu instructing students in the preparation of fish specimens in 1963

In 1952, the Shanghai Fisheries College (now Shanghai Ocean University) was established as a higher-education institution specialising in fisheries education and research. Zhu became the first director of its Marine Fisheries Research Laboratory.

In 1956, Zhu was appointed a Chinese delegation representative to a joint fisheries research committee involving China, the Soviet Union, North Korea, and North Vietnam. He represented China at several international meetings. In 1957, he was designated a national-level professor and, in November of that year, was appointed president of Shanghai Fisheries College by the State Council of the People's Republic of China.

In 1959, the East China Sea Fisheries Research Institute was established. Zhu became its first director and also headed its ichthyology research laboratory.

Between 1960 and 1963, Zhu produced several important scientific works, including studies of Chinese cartilaginous fishes and the taxonomy of the family Sciaenidae. He also co-authored 南海鱼类志 (Fishes of the South China Sea) and 东海鱼类志 (Fishes of the East China Sea). These publications contributed to the systematic study of China's marine fish fauna and the distribution of fisheries resources in its coastal waters.

During the Cultural Revolution, Shanghai Fisheries College was disbanded. Despite the difficult research conditions, Zhu completed the cartilaginous-fish volume of 中国动物志 (Fauna Sinica) in 1973, in collaboration with Wang Wenbin.

Following the end of the Cultural Revolution, Zhu advocated the restoration of Shanghai Fisheries College. In 1979, the State Council approved its reinstatement and appointed him president. In 1983, he became honorary president because of his advanced age.

From 1977 until his death in 1986, Zhu continued his research and writing. His work included studies of the lateral-line canals and the ampullae of Lorenzini in Chinese cartilaginous fishes. He also co-authored books on the marine economic fishes of Fujian and the fishes of Fujian Province, and published approximately 25 research papers during this period.

Zhu died in Shanghai on 17 December 1986, aged 90. He donated his personal collection of books and research materials, numbering more than 20,000 items. His government-awarded funds were also donated to Shanghai Fisheries College to establish a scholarship fund in his name.

== Academic contributions ==
Zhu played a major role in the development of modern fish taxonomy in China. His principal contributions included:

- Publishing 中国鱼类索引 (Index of Chinese Fishes) in 1931, a systematic taxonomic reference that catalogued 1,533 fish species recorded in China.
- Publishing early studies of Chinese ichthyological literature and illustrated descriptions of Chinese fishes, helping establish a foundation for modern ichthyological research in China.
- Describing four new subfamilies, ten new genera, and 48 new species of fishes, according to a biographical account published by Guangming Online.
- Advancing knowledge of fish taxonomy, geographical distribution, and the characteristics of fish faunas in Chinese waters.

His publications on the fishes of the South China Sea and East China Sea were particularly influential in the investigation of marine fish diversity and fisheries resources.

== Positions and professional affiliations ==
Zhu held a number of academic and public positions, including:

- Member of the second National Committee of the Chinese People's Political Consultative Conference.
- Representative to the first through fifth Shanghai Municipal People's Congresses.
- Representative to the second and fifth National People's Congresses.
- Chinese representative to the joint fisheries research committee of China, the Soviet Union, North Korea, and North Vietnam.
- Honorary chairman of a national fisheries-related academic association.
- Honorary chairman of the Chinese Society of Oceanology and Limnology.
- Vice-chairman of the China Society of Fisheries.
- Council member of the Zoological Society of China.
- Honorary president of Shanghai Fisheries College.
- Editor of the fisheries section of the agriculture volume of the Encyclopedia of China.
- Editor of the Journal of Fisheries of China.
- International corresponding researcher associated with the American Museum of Natural History in New York.

== Awards and honours ==
Zhu is regarded as one of the founders of Chinese fish taxonomy. He was also a founding figure in the development of Shanghai Fisheries College and the East China Sea Fisheries Research Institute.

- 1939: Received a gold certificate of merit from the Natural History Society of Peiping (now Beijing).
- 1978: Received a Fujian Provincial Science and Technology Achievement Award.
- 16 August 1996: Commemorations were held for the centenary of his birth. Rong Yiren, a former vice president of China, wrote an inscription honouring Zhu's professional dedication and exemplary conduct.
- The pharyngeal bones of cyprinid fishes have been associated with Zhu's name in Chinese scientific literature as a tribute to his contributions to fish taxonomy and morphology.

== Selected publications ==
- Zhu, Yuanding (1931). 中国鱼类索引 (Index of Chinese Fishes).
- Zhu, Yuanding (1962). 南海鱼类志 (Fishes of the South China Sea).
- Zhu, Yuanding (1963). 东海鱼类志 (Fishes of the East China Sea).
- Zhu, Yuanding, and Wang Wenbin (1973). Cartilaginous-fish volume of 中国动物志 (Fauna Sinica).
- 中国动物志：圆口纲、软骨鱼纲 (Fauna Sinica: Cyclostomata and Chondrichthyes) (listed in the source material as 2000).
