= Department of Political Science Soochow University (Taiwan) =

The Department of Political Science of Soochow University is one of the oldest departement of the university. This departement exists since 1954, when Soochow University was reestablished in Taiwan.

== History ==
The Department of Political Science of Soochow University has over 50 years of history, being one of the four departments that existed during the reestablishment of the university in Taiwan in 1954. The Master program of the department was established in 1991; followed by the Doctoral program in 1998.

In 2003, in a very rigorous review held by Soochow University, the Department of Political Science was evaluated excellent among the inspectors from the Evaluation and Review Committee of academic fields. The department is also awarded with financial support to help to fund many teaching and research activities and projects with unique features. The Department has also been funded by the Ministry of Education under the Teaching Excellence Projects. Since 2009, Shiow-Duan Hawang is the director of the department.

== Programs and goals ==
The teaching program is characterized by a multidisciplinary approach of history of political thought, Comparative Government and Politics, international relations and public administration. The international exchanges and various academic activities and lectures for teachers and students play an important role in this department.

The teaching programs of the department are particularly oriented on international issues. In addition to basic trainings in political science, the departement offers diversified curriculum and programs open to international students.

== Scientific Research ==
From 1999 to 2008, teachers of the Department have conducted 90 research projects granted by the government and its National Science Council.

Since 2000, the Department of Political Science has been organized the Research Center, the Center for Globalization Studies, the Center for E.U Studies, the Centre for Parliamentary Research, the Center for UN, Studies and the Metropolitan Governance Study Center and the Workshop of Human Rights and Democracy.

== Soochow Journal of Political Science ==
With its first issue released in 1991, the Soochow Journal of Political Science has continued to develop its reputation. Since the journal changed to a quarterly publication in September 2004, the Soochow Journal of Political Science has been included in the TSSCI (Taiwan Social Science Citation Index).

The contributions published in the journal come from a wide range of research related to the most diverse areas. Many professors, researchers, teachers or researchers in political science from Soochow University, as elsewhere, had contributed to the writing of this journal.

== Faculty ==
The departement includes scholars such as Shiow-Duan Hawang, Bih-Rong Liu, Wen-Cheng Wu, Hao-Yu Wang, Ya-Tang Hsu, Chen-Yu Hsieh, Chen-Kuo Hsu, Mab Huang, Chih-Cheng Lo, Li-Khan Chen, Huei-Huang Wang, Shu-Pin Liu, Hsiu-Chuan Tsai, Jui-Chi Chen, Chun-Hung Chen, Chih-Chung Wu, Yung-Ming Hsu, Chiung-Chu Lin, Yun-Chu Tsai, Yueh-Chu Lin and Ju-Dar Shen.
