= Chang Show-foong =

Taiwanese writer, environmentalist, and politician

Chang Show-foong MLY
- 張曉風
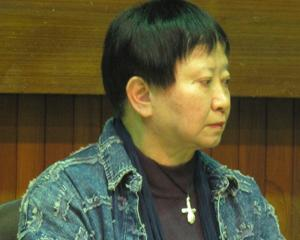
- Chang in May 2010

Member of the Legislative Yuan
- In office 1 February 2012 – 15 March 2013
- Succeeded by: Chen Yi-chieh
- Constituency: Republic of China

Personal details
- Born: 29 March 1941 (age 85) Jinhua, Zhejiang, Republic of China
- Party: People First Party
- Education: Soochow University (BA)
- Profession: Environmentalist, writer

Chang Show-foong (Chinese: 張曉風; pinyin: Zhāng Xiǎofēng; Pe̍h-ōe-jī: Tiuⁿ Hiáu-hong; born 29 March 1941) is a Taiwanese environmentalist, writer, and politician. She was elected to the Legislative Yuan in 2012 and served until her resignation in March 2013.

== Education and literary career ==
Chang is a native of Jinhua, and moved to Taiwan in 1949. She studied Chinese literature at Soochow University, graduating in 1962. She has taught at her alma mater, and also at Hong Kong Baptist Theological Seminary and National Yang-Ming University. Most of her works incorporate historical events as allegories to modern times.

== Activism ==
Chang made her opposition to the construction of a biotechnology park in Nangang District, Taipei known in 2010, having described the area as "Taipei's last piece of green land." Her advocacy featured direct visits to the site, where she favored the retention of the area's natural wetlands as "Taipei's Central Park." Chang also supported the maintenance of Pingtung County's Alangyi Trail. She has compared substandard care of public greenery to foot binding.

== Political career ==
She was named to the Legislative Yuan via the proportional representation party list system as a representative of the People First Party. As a legislator, Chang continued supporting a wide range of green causes. In March 2012, she proposed that the government provide aid to single women, advising Taiwanese men against transnational marriage, calling the practice a "strange habit." Chang's comments drew criticism from multiple civic groups. She resigned from the legislature on 15 March 2013.
