= David Lawrence Anderson =

American Episcopal missionary to China

David Lawrence Anderson (4 February 1850 - 16 March 1911) was an Episcopal minister and missionary to China. Anderson served as the first president of Soochow University as well as a founding member of their board of trustees. He spent one year in Shanghai, China and 26 years in Suzhou, China originally as a religious missionary then mainly in education. He was involved in the formation and solidification of Southern Methodist missionary universities in China.

== Early life and family ==
David Lawrence Anderson was born on February 4, 1850, in Summerhill, South Carolina to James Harkins Anderson and Mary Margaret Adams, who were a part of a larger merchant family.

On December 31, 1879, he married Mary Garland Thomson, a musician and church worker, of Huntsville, Alabama. Together, they had five children.

=== Education ===
Anderson attended Washington and Lee University in Lexington, Virginia. He studied for two years before abandoning his studies. Much later, he received an honorary Doctor of Divinity degree from the school.

Anderson worked briefly as a bookkeeper for the Atlanta Constitution, which was his father’s newspaper. He then became a minister for the North Georgia Conference of the Southern Methodist Church.

== Missionary work ==
Anderson was sent by the American Methodist Episcopal Church, South to China. Anderson arrived by boat in China in 1882. Originally, he preached the gospel at a chapel in Jiading, a suburban district of Shanghai. After one year there, he transferred to Suzhou to preach in the Kung Hang Chapel. He remained in Suzhou for the rest of his life. Five years later, the Lequn Social Church was established in Gongxiang Alley in Central Suzhou with Anderson as the first pastor.

Many young people attended Anderson’s chapel, asking him to teach them English afterwards, so they could receive a western education. This led to the formation of an informal school, known as the Kung Hang School (later known as Kung-hsiang Academy), where Anderson and three members of his family taught courses in math, science, and English. The first year, there were 25 students at the school, which grew to 40 in year two and 109 in year three. Anderson, Young John Allen, and other missionaries in the region began seeking funding for a university. However, the Boxer Rebellion created unrest in China, closing the Kung Hang School and halting any plans for a university.

After China stabilized again, Anderson restarted his attempt to establish a university in Suzhou. He spent 1900 in the US raising funds for the university, where he raised over $100,000 in gold. On May 13, 1900, Anderson was one of the seven members of the board of trustees for the proposed university at a Board of Missions meeting in Nashville, Tennessee. On December 15, 1900, the board of trustees met and selected Anderson as the founding president of the university. In March 1901, Central University of China was founded (later renamed Soochow University during the Republic of China period). Most of the students at this school went to the accompanying day school for the first years. The university followed the example of an American university. There were three departments: theology, liberal arts, and science.

=== Educational philosophy ===
Anderson's approach to Christian education influenced the future of university teaching in China. He originally presented his plan at the Conference of the Christian Educational Association in China in Shanghai in 1902. He opposed a large amount of time devoted to bible study, rather opting for the teaching of Christian values through other courses, such as Western history. Additionally, he implemented intellectual elements from western civilization, but opposed calling science and technology “western culture”. He also worked to maintain elements of traditional Chinese education within the curriculum. He established Chinese courses for the benefit of his students, despite never learning how to speak Chinese. A large portion of the curriculum involved the implementation of “junzi”, an aspect of Confucianism that emphasized acting as a gentleman. This created goals such as "high ethical standards, polite behaviors, and obedient character" for his students.

== Death and legacy ==
On March 16, 1911, Anderson died in his family’s home with pneumonia. His body was buried in the now defunct Pashinjiao Cemetery in the mission lot.

On campus, there is both a large bronze statue of Anderson and a building named after him. The day of his death, March 16, is University Day. The school credits Anderson with creating the university in the style of Western universities and for establishing entrepreneurship as a central tenet of the school.
