= Illy and Lean =

Taiwanese YouTube channel

YouTube information
- Channel: @illyandlean
- Subscribers: 825k
- Views: 173 million

ILLY & LEAN (Chinese: 壹加壹) is a Taiwanese YouTube channel hosted by the married couple Illy (一粒) and Lean (令).

== Career ==
Illy and Lean posted their first video to YouTube on 20 Jul 2015

In 2020, they appeared in Elle Taiwan.

In 2025, they won an award at Walk Bell John Awards (走鐘獎).

They have worked with several brands including:

- Intel
- Tommy Hilfiger
- Schick
- New Balance
- LG

On the 18th August 2026, Illy and Lean announced an AI subtitle tool aimed at a traditional Chinese audience, called What'Sub.

== Personal life ==
After dating for 13 years, Lean proposed to Illy on top of Mount Fuji in 2023.

In 2025, the couple married in Taiwan.
