= Private Jiangnan University =

The Private Jiangnan University (私立江南大学; 1947 – 1952, in Wuxi), was founded in Wuxi in 1947 by Rong Desheng ( 荣德生, the father of Rong Yiren ), the largest national capitalist in the Republic of China era.

== Universities ==
The university was source of several universities in east China area including

=== Nanjing Institute of Technology ===
(NIT, 南京工学院 1952–1988, now Southeast University (东南大学, 1988–present) )

The engineering related department including mechanical engineering, electrical engineering and food science and engineering merged into Nanjing Institute of Technology in 1952.

=== East China Institute of Chemical Technology ===
(华东化工学院, 1952, now East China University of Science and Technology, 1993–present, Shanghai)

The chemical engineering department merged into East China Institute of Chemical Technology (华东化工学院) in 1952.

=== Soochow University (Suzhou) ===
During the higher education adjustment, the art and science section of original Soochow University (东吴大学) merged with the Southern Jiangsu College of Culture and Education (苏南文化教育学院) and the Department of Mathematics and Physics at private Jiangnan University (私立江南大学 数理系) to form the Jiangsu Teacher's College ( 江苏师范学院 ) in 1952, which was renamed Soochow University (Suzhou) in 1982.

=== Shanghai College of Finance and Economics ===
Industrial Management department merged into Shanghai College of Finance and Economics (上海财政经济学院) in 1952. The institution adopted its present name the Shanghai University of Finance and Economics (上海财经大学) in 1985.
