= Qujing No.1 Middle School =

Chinese school

Coordinates: 25°29′36.37″N 103°48′2.65″E

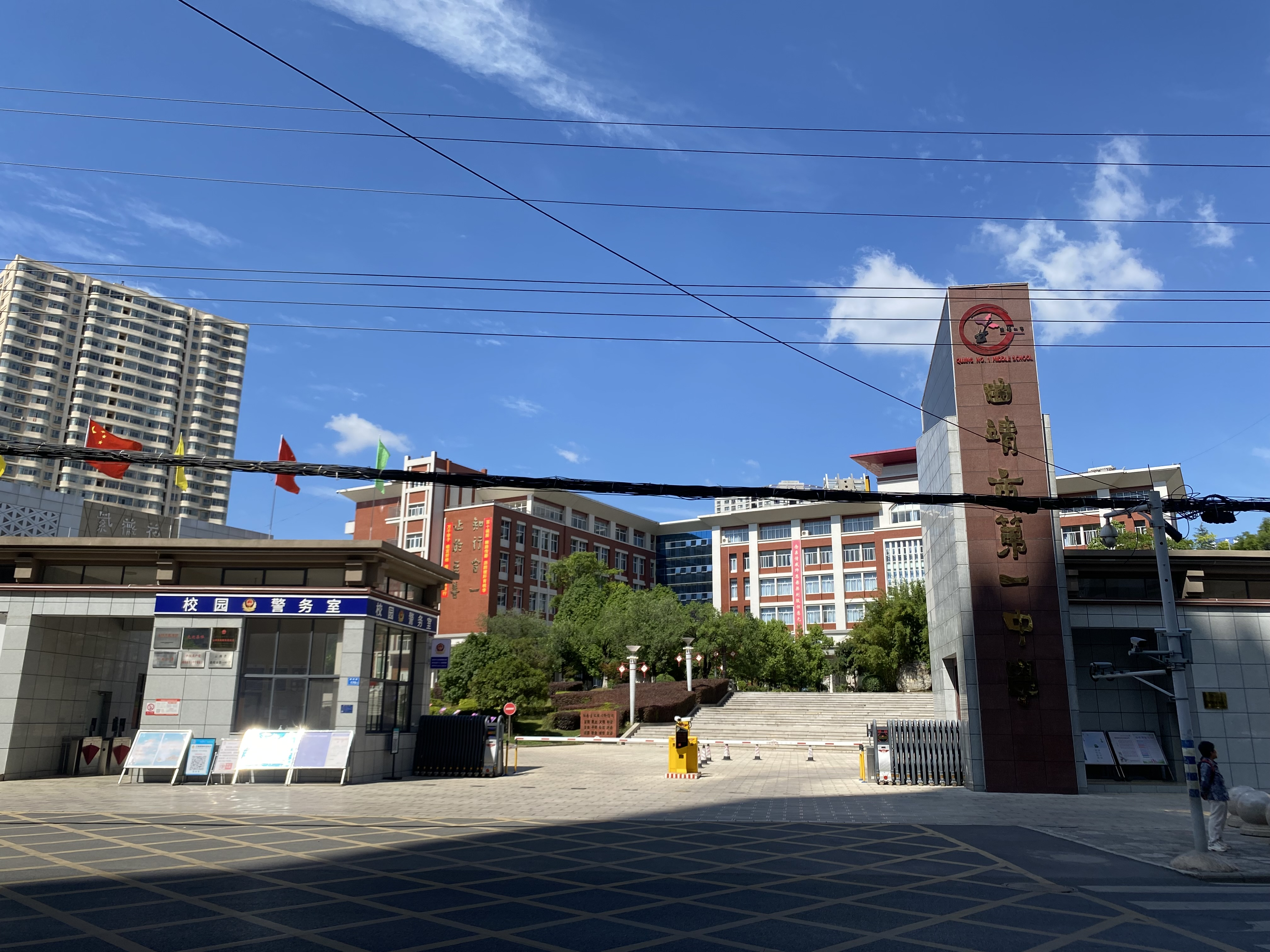

Location
- The east inner ring road No.86, Qiling District, Qujing, Yunnan, 655000

Information
- Type: Public Schools
- Motto: The Unity of Knowledge and Practice
- Established: 1913; 113 years ago
- Grades: Senior High School
- Athletics: Tuanjie Cup Soccer
- Affiliation: Yunnan, Qujing City Board of Education
- Website: http://www.qjyz.net/

Qujing NO.1 Middle School is a senior middle school in Yunnan, China. It was established in 1913 by E. Cai, the Governor of Yunnan, the school is located at the center of Qujing City. There are many famous cultural relics in this school, such as Cuan monument, which is one of the greatest achievements of the art of Chinese calligraphy.

== Famous alumni ==
- Zuxun Wang, Former president of the Academy of Military Sciences of the People's Liberation Army, granted the rank of general
- Runqian Huang, Academician
- Yongkang Hu, Academician
