= Soochow University (1900–1952) =

University in China from 1900 to 1952

- 東吳大學
- Motto: 養天地正氣 法古今完人
- Motto in English: Unto A Full Grown Man
- Type: Private
- Established: Founded 1900
- Location: Suzhou and Shanghai, Jiangsu, Republic of China; 31°18′16″N 120°38′13″E
- 1952, split into Soochow University (Taiwan) and Soochow University (Suzhou)

The original Soochow University (Chinese: 東吳大學) was a university based in Suzhou and Shanghai in China, established in 1900. The university was registered in the state of Tennessee in the United States.

After the Chinese Civil War, the university was disbanded by the People's Republic of China government in 1952, with its faculties amalgamated with parts of other universities to create various specialist universities in Suzhou and Shanghai. One of these specialist institutions, the Jiangsu Teacher's College (also known as Jiangsu Normal School), took over the main Suzhou campus of the old Soochow University, and in 1982 adopted the English name Soochow University (a different Chinese name to the original institution was adopted).

A different university by the same name (both in English and Chinese) was set up by alumni in Taiwan in 1951.

== History ==
The original Soochow University was founded by Methodist missionaries in Suzhou, Jiangsu, Qing dynasty in 1900 as a merger of three existing institutions: the Buffington Institute and the Kung Hang School in the city of Soochow (now spelled Suzhou), in Jiangsu Province, and the Anglo-Chinese College in Shanghai, which at the time was also part of Jiangsu Province. In 1901, the university registered in the state of Tennessee in the United States under the name Central University in China. Its first president was David Lawrence Anderson who was also the founder of the predecessor Kung Hang School.

The original Soochow University, like the university currently in Taiwan, was named Dōngwú Dàxué (東吳大學) in Chinese. "Dongwu" or "East Wu" refers to the Wu region, in which both Suzhou and Shanghai are located and of which Suzhou was historically the cultural and political centre.

Soochow University was especially well known for the quality of its law school, based in Shanghai.

After the Chinese Civil War, members of the Soochow Alumni Association who moved to Taiwan established a new institution in Taiwan in 1951 to make up for the Soochow University lost in mainland China. A law school was opened in 1954, and a full university was certified in 1971.

After the establishment of the PRC, the institution in Suzhou merged with the Southern Jiangsu College of Culture and Education and the Department of Mathematics and Physics at Jiangnan University to form the Jiangsu Teacher's College in 1952, while the law school in Shanghai merged into the East China University of Politics and Law. The English name Soochow University was revived in 1982 by the Jiangsu Teacher’s College; however, the original Chinese name Dongwu 東吳 was not adopted, and the institution was given the name Suzhou 苏州.

== Successor universities ==
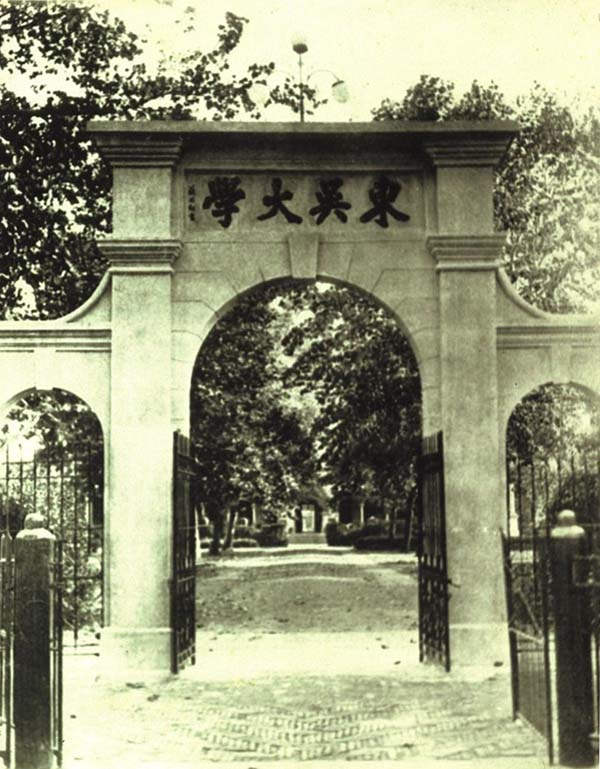
Soochow University old gate in Suzhou, China

From 1900 to 1952, Soochow University (simplified Chinese: 东吴大学; traditional Chinese: 東吳大學; pinyin: Dōngwú Dàxué) operated in Suzhou and Shanghai

- Soochow University (Suzhou) (simplified Chinese: 苏州大学; traditional Chinese: 蘇州大學; pinyin: Sūzhōu Dàxué; 1982–present) - into which several of the original university's faculties merged in 1952, and based at the original campus of Soochow University.
- East China University of Political Science and Law - into which the Soochow University Law School merged in 1952.
- Shanghai University of Finance and Economics - into which the Soochow University accounting faculty merged in 1952.
- Soochow University (Taiwan) (Chinese: 東吳大學; pinyin: Dōngwú Dàxué; operating in Taiwan 1952–present) - revival by alumni.
- Chung Chi College of the Chinese University of Hong Kong - founded in 1951 as a successor to 13 abolished Christian universities in mainland China, including Soochow University, later a founding college of the Chinese University of Hong Kong.
