= Soochow University (Suzhou) =

Public university in Suzhou, Jiangsu, China

Coordinates: 31°18′39″N 120°38′08″E

- 苏州大学
- Motto: 養天地正氣，法古今完人
- Motto in English: Unto A Full Grown Man
- Type: Public
- Established: 1900; 126 years ago
- Affiliations: NAHLU
- President: Xiaohong Zhang
- Location: Suzhou (Soochow), Jiangsu, China
- Campus: Urban
- Website: eng.suda.edu.cn

Chinese name
- Simplified Chinese: 苏州大学
- Traditional Chinese: 蘇州大學
Transcriptions
Standard Mandarin
- Hanyu Pinyin: Sūzhōu Dàxué
Wu
- Wugniu: su^{1} tseu^{1} da^{6} ghoq^{8}
- Suzhounese: sou^{1} tseu^{1} da^{6} ghoq^{8}
- IPA: Shanghainese: [su˥ tsɤ˧ da˨ ɦoʔ˦] Suzhounese: [səu˦ tsøʏ dɑ˨ ɦoʔ˧]
Yue: Cantonese
- Jyutping: sou^{1} zau^{1} daai^{6} hok^{6}

Soochow University (Chinese: 苏州大学; Pinyin: Sūzhōu Dàxué; abbreviated SUDA) is a comprehensive university located in Suzhou, Jiangsu Province, one of the most economically developed regions in China. It is administered by the Jiangsu Provincial People's Government and co-sponsored by the Ministry of Education and Jiangsu Province as part of the national Double First-Class initiative. The university is also co-constructed by the China National Space Administration. Soochow University was among the first institutions included in China's Project 211 and the 2011 Collaborative Innovation Plan. It is one of China's leading universities, ranking 28th nationwide.

As of May 2025, the university operates four campuses—Tiancizhuang, Dushu Lake, Yangcheng Lake, and the Future Campus—covering an area of 3.06 million square meters with over 1.66 million square meters of building space. Soochow University comprises 37 schools and departments, offering 132 undergraduate programs, 47 first-level master's degree disciplines, 35 professional master's degree categories, 31 first-level doctoral disciplines, 1 professional doctoral program, and 30 postdoctoral research stations. The university has 5,983 faculty and staff members and a student population of over 45,000.

== History ==
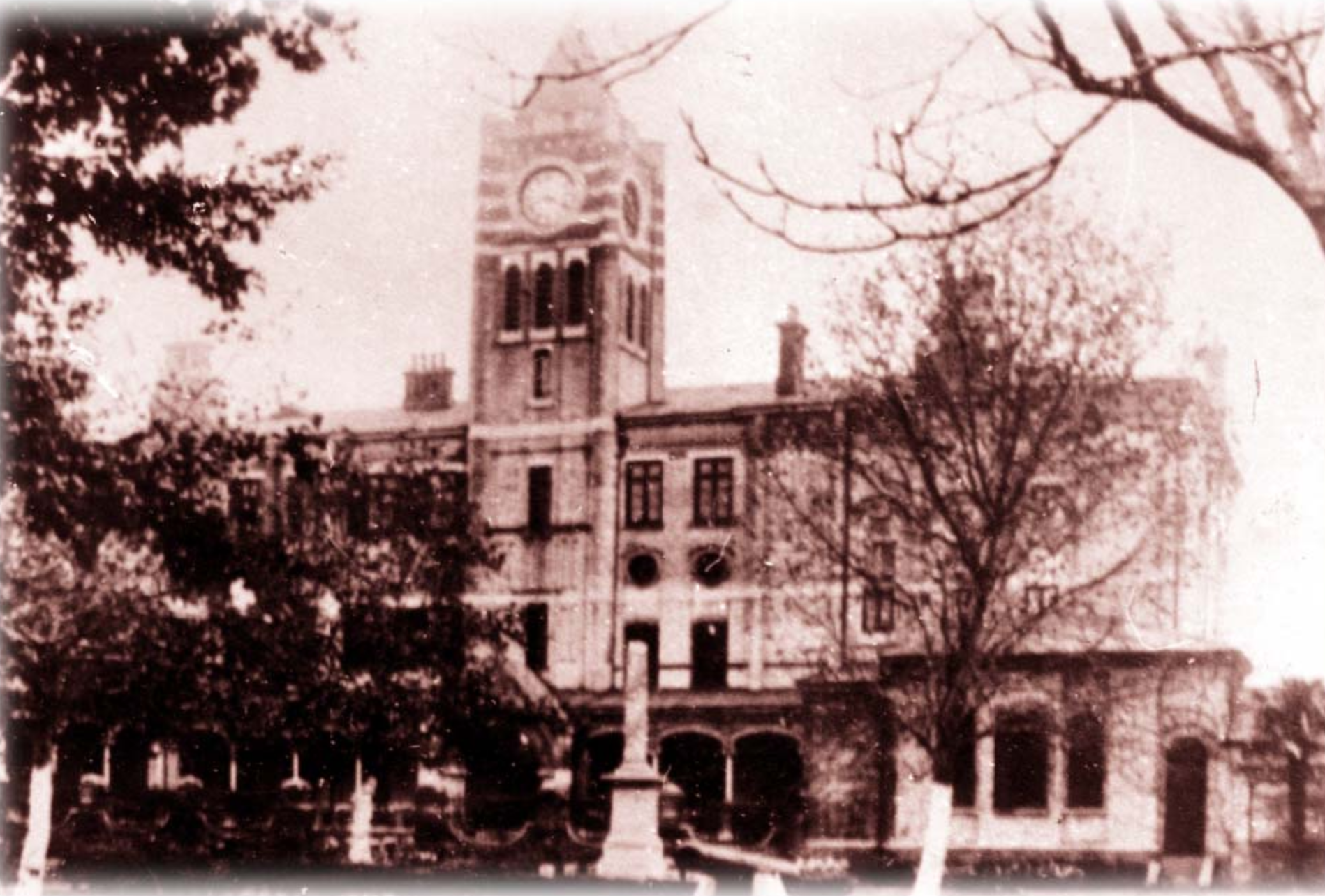
Main building in the Republic of China period

The original Soochow University (simplified Chinese: 东吴大学; traditional Chinese: 東吳大學; pinyin: Dōngwú Dàxué; Wade–Giles: tung-wu ta hsüeh) was founded by Methodists in Suzhou in 1900 as a merger of three existing institutions: the Po-hsi Academy, the Kung-hsiang Academy, and the Chung-hsi Academy by David Lawrence Anderson who became its first president. Originally known as the Central University of China, it was renamed the Soochow University in the Republic of China period.

The university was split in 1949 as a result of the Chinese Civil War, and merged with the Southern Jiangsu College of Culture and Education and the Department of Mathematics and Physics at Jiangnan University to form the Jiangsu Teacher's College in 1952. The English name Soochow University was revived in 1982; however, the original Chinese name "東吳 (Tung-wu)" was not adopted, and the institution was given the Chinese name "蘇州 (Soochow)". The Suzhou College of Sericulture, Suzhou Institute of Silk Textile Technology and Suzhou Medical College were each merged into the university in 1995, 1997 and 2000 successively.

Members of the Soochow Alumni Association who fled to Taiwan after 1949 established the Soochow University in Taipei, starting with its College of Law in 1951 and becoming a full-fledged university with five schools in 1971.

== Academics ==
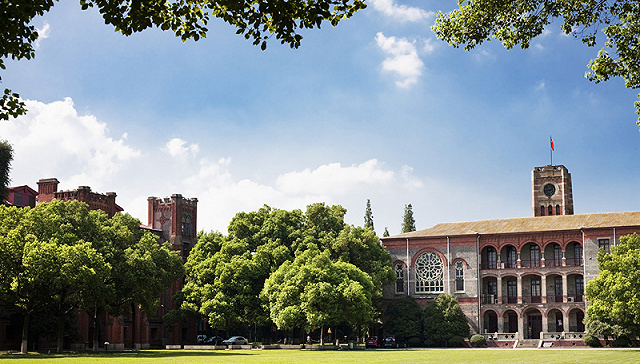
Main Campus

The university is a member of the "2011 plan", a program launched in 2011 by the Chinese Ministry of Education. It is a member of SAP University Alliances.

University rankings
BCUR National	Domestic	46
Wu Shulian National	Domestic	28
CUAA National	Alumni	38
QS National	General	=41
THE National	General	32–37
QS Asia (Asia version)	General	220
THE Asia (Asia version)	General	108
ARWU World	Research	101–150
QS World	General	641–650
THE World	General	501–600
USNWR World	General	292

In 2025, Soochow University was ranked in the 101-150 band by Academic Ranking of World Universities. The U.S. News & World Report 2025 ranked Soochow University #292 in the world, 67th in Asia and 40th in China. CWUR World University Ranking 2025 ranked Soochow University 210th worldwide and 28th nationwide.

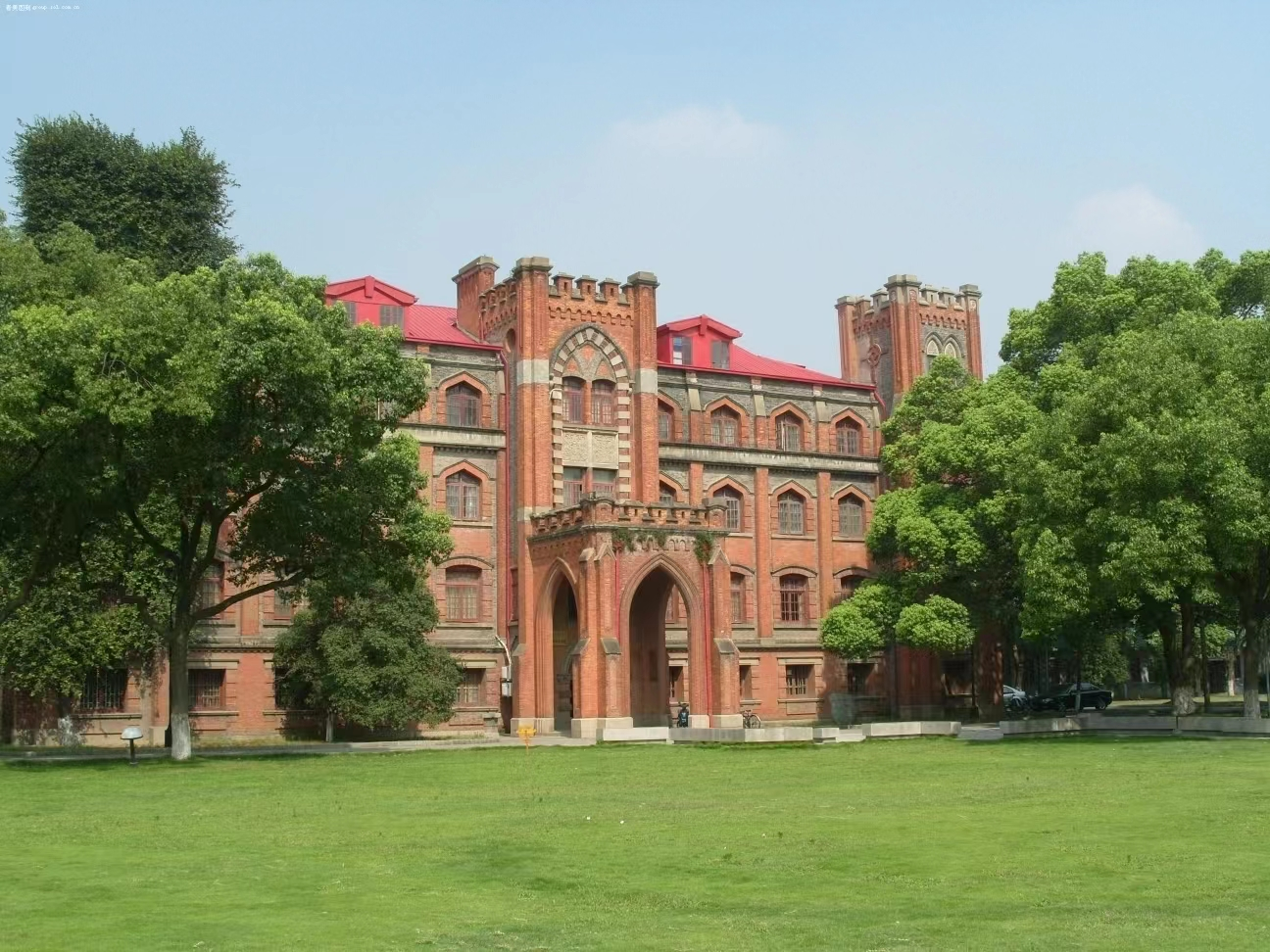
Mathematics Building
