= Phi Tau Phi =

Taiwanese honor society

- ΦΤΦ
- Founded: May 25, 1921; 105 years ago Peiyang University
- Type: Honor
- Affiliation: Independent
- Status: Active
- Scope: National
- Chapters: 56
- Members: 70,000+ lifetime
- Headquarters: 4F., AD, No. 43, Section 4, Keelung Road; Da'an District, Taipei City 106335; Taiwan
- Website: www.phitauphi.org.tw

The Phi Tau Phi Scholastic Honor Society of the Republic of China (simply Phi Tau Phi or ΦΤΦ; Chinese: 中華民國斐陶斐榮譽學會) is an honor society based in Taiwan. It was founded in 1921 at Peiyang University, China. The Society aims to encourage scholarship, stimulate research, reward scholastic achievement, and form bonds of intellectual and professional fellowship. It has recognized over 70,000 members in the past hundred years.

== History ==
On May 25, 1921, Joseph H. Ehlers, then a professor at Peiyang University, proposed the idea to establish an honor society that encourages integrity and diligence across universities in Mainland China.

On May 4, 1922, the first general meeting was held at the Shanghai Youth Association. Fourteen nationwide university representatives, including those from Shanghai Jiao Tong University, National Southeast University, Yenching University, and others, attended the meeting. The first board of directors was then elected, with Ping-Wen Kuo serving as the president.

After the retreat of the government of the Republic of China to Taiwan, the society once suspended its activities. However, it was resumed in March 1964 at the call of the members. Multiple university chapters have since been established in Taiwan, including National Chiao Tung University, Soochow University, National Taiwan University.

Phi Tau Phi also has an affiliated organization, the Phi Tau Phi Scholastic Honor Society of America, divided into three regional chapters: East America, Mid-America, and West America.

== Symbols ==
The Greek letters Phi Tau Phi were selected to represent Philosophia (the mother of all sciences), Technologia (applied science), and Physiologia (theoretical science), which collectively represent all disciplines of learning.

== Membership ==
Membership is by recommendation only, by an established university chapter. Membership recognizes and honors those who are:

- the top one percent of undergraduate graduates in each university based on the cumulative grade before the semester of graduation, as well as the excellence in moral conduct;
- the top three percent of master’s graduands in each university who are excellent in academic performance as well as moral conduct;
- the top ten percent of doctoral graduands in each university who are excellent in academic performance as well as moral conduct; or
- one to three alumni of each university who have made significant contributions to academic research or social undertakings.

== Chapters ==
Following is a list of Phi Tau Phi chapters.

Institution	Location	Status	References
Asian University	Taichung, Taiwan	Active	
Central Taiwan University of Science and Technology	Beitun, Taichung, Taiwan	Inactive	(Note: Chapter formed at Chung Tai University, now Central Taiwan University of Science and Technology.)
Chang Gung University of Science and Technology	Taoyuan, Taiwan	Inactive	
Chang Jung Christian University	Gueiren, Tainan, Taiwan	Active	
Chaoyang University of Technology	Taichung, Taiwan	Active	
Chia Nan University of Pharmacy and Science	Tainan, Taiwan	Inactive	
Chiao Kuang University of Science and Technology	Taiwan	Inactive	
China Medical University	Taichung, Taiwan	Active	
Chinese Culture University	Taipei, Taiwan	Inactive	
Chung Hua University	Hsinchu, Taiwan	Active	
Chung Yuan Christian University	Zhongli District, Taoyuan City, Taiwan	Active	
Dahan Institute of Technology	Xincheng, Hualien, Taiwan	Active	
Daren University of Science and Technology	Taoyuan, Taiwan	Active	
Dayeh University	Dacun, Changhua, Taiwan	Inactive	
East America	Fresh Meadows, New York, United States	Active	(Note: Chapter includes Alabama, Arkansas, Connecticut, Florida, Georgia, Louisiana, Maine, Massachusetts, New Hampshire, New Jersey, New York, North Carolina, Pennsylvania, South Carolina, Tennessee, and Vermont.)
Fen Jen Catholic University Foundation	New Taipei City, Taiwan	Active	
Feng Chia University	Taichung, Taiwan	Active	
Fooyin University	Daliao, Kaohsiung, Taiwan	Active	
Global University of Science and Technology	Taiwan	Inactive	
Ho Chun University of Science and Technology	Taiwan	Inactive	
Hsuan Chuang University	Hsinchu City, Taiwan	Active	
Huafan University	New Taipei City, Taiwan	Active	
I-Shou University	Kaohsiung, Taiwan	Active	
Jingyi University	Shalu, Taichung, Taiwan	Active	
Li Te University	Taiwan	Inactive	
Lide University	Taiwan	Active	
Lunghwa University of Science and Technology	Taoyuan, Taiwan	Inactive	
Meiho University of Science and Technology	Taiwan	Active	
Mid-America	United States	Active	(Note: Chapter covers Illinois, Indiana, Iowa, Kansas, Michigan, Minnesota, Missouri, Nebraska, North Dakota, Ohio, South Dakota, and Wisconsin.)
Nan Kai University of Technology	Caotun, Nantou, Taiwan	Inactive	
Nanhua University	Dalin, Chiayi, Taiwan	Active	
National Central University	Taoyuan, Taiwan	Active	
National Changhua University of Education	Changhua, Taiwan	Active	
National Cheng Kung University	Tainan, Taiwan	Active	
National Chi Nan University	Puli, Nantou, Taiwan	Active	
National Chiao Tung University	Hsinchu, Taiwan	Active	
National Chiayi University	Chiayi, Taiwan	Inactive	
National Chin-Yi University of Technology	Taiping, Taichung, Taiwan	Active	
National Chengchi University	Taipei, Taiwan	Active	
National Chiao Tung University	Hsinchu, Taiwan	Active	
National Chiayi University	Chiayi, Taiwan	Active	
National Chung Cheng University	Minxiong, Chiayi, Taiwan	Active	
National Chung Hsing University	Taichung, Taiwan	Active	
National Dong Hwa University	Hualien City, Taiwan	Active	
National Formosa University	Huwei, Yunlin, Taiwan	Active	
National Hualien Teachers College	Hualien City, Taiwan	Inactive	(Note: The teacher's college became the National Hualien University of Education in 2005, which merged into National Dong Hwa University in 2008.)
National Kaohsiung First University of Science and Technology	Kaohsiung, Taiwan	Inactive	
National Kaohsiung Normal University	Kaohsiung, Taiwan	Active	
National Kaosiung University of Science and Technology	Kaohsiung, Taiwan	Active	
National Quemoy University	Jinning, Kinmen, Taiwan	Active	
National Pingtung University	Pingtung City, Taiwan	Inactive	
National Sun Yat-sen University	Sizihwan, Kaohsiung, Taiwan	Active	
National Sun Yat-sen University School of Medicine	Sizihwan, Kaohsiung, Taiwan	Active	
National Taichung University of Education	Taichung, Taiwan	Active	
National Tainan University	Tainan, Taiwan	Active	
National Taipei University	Sanxia District, New Taipei, Taiwan	Active	
National Taipei University of Education	Daan District, Taipei, Taiwan	Inactive	
National Taitung University	Taitung City, Taiwan	Active	
National Taiwan Normal University	Taipei, Taiwan	Active	
National Taiwan Ocean University	Keelung, Taiwan	Active	
National Taiwan University	Taipei, Taiwan	Active	
National Taiwan University of Science and Technology	Taipei, Taiwan	Active	
National Tsing Hua University	Hsinchu, Taiwan	Active	
National United University	Miaoli County, Taiwan	Active	
National University of Kaohsiung	Kaohsiung, Taiwan	Active	
National Yang Ming Chiao Tung University	East District, Hsinchu, Taiwan	Active	
National Yang-Ming University	Beitou District, Taipei, Taiwan	Active	
National Yunlin University of Science and Technology	Yunlin County, Taiwan	Active	
Qiaoguang University of Science and Technology	Taiwan	Active	
Republic of China Army Officer School	Zhongli, Taoyuan, Taiwan	Inactive	
St. John's University of Science and Technology	Tamsui District, New Taipei City, Taiwan	Inactive	
Shih Hsin University	Taipei, Taiwan	Inactive	
Soochow University	Taipei, Taiwan	Active	
Southern Taiwan University of Science and Technology	Yongkang District, Tainan, Taiwan	Active	
Ta Hwa University of Science and Technology	Qionglin, Hsinchu, Taiwan	Inactive	(Note: Chapter formed at Tahan University of Science and Technology, now Ta Hwa University of Science and Technology.)
Tainan National University of the Arts	Tainan, Taiwan	Active	
Taipei Medical University	Xinyi District, Taipei, Taiwan	Active	
Taipei Municipal University	Zhongzheng, Taiwan	Active	
Taiwan Capital University Foundation	Taiwan	Inactive	
Tajen University	Yanpu, Pingtung County, Taiwan	Inactive	
Tamkang University Foundation	Tamsui District, New Taipei City, Taiwan	Active	
Tatung University	Taipei, Taiwan	Active	
Tunghai University	Taichung, Taiwan	Active	
Tzu Chi University	Hualien City, Taiwan	Inactive	
University of Kang Ning	Annan, Tainan, Taiwan	Inactive	
Wenzao Ursuline University of Languages	Kaohsiung, Taiwan	Active	
West America	Pasadena, California, United States	Active	(Note: Chapter includes the University of California, Los Angeles; University of California, Berkeley; Stanford University; the California Institute of Technology; and the University of Southern California.)
Yuan Ze University	Taoyuan, Taiwan	Active	

== See also ==
- List of medical schools in Taiwan
- List of universities and colleges in Taiwan
