= Joint Private Medical Universities Admissions System =

University alliance test in Taiwan

6 Private Medical University Logo.

Joint Private Medical Universities Admissions System (JPMAS; Chinese: 私醫聯招; Pe̍h-ōe-jī: Su-i Liân-chiau) is a private medical university alliance test for enrolling transfer students in Taiwan. Student candidates for this test should take four subjects:

- Chinese (medical Chinese)
- English (medical English)
- Biology (university basic Biology)
- Chemistry (university basic Chemistry)

== Private medical universities ==
- Tzu Chi University
- Kaohsiung Medical University
- Chang Gung University
- Chung Shan Medical University
- China Medical University
- Taipei Medical University

== See also ==
- List of universities in Taiwan
- University alliances in Taiwan
  - National University System of Taiwan
