= University System of Taiwan =

University alliance in Taiwan

The University System of Taiwan (UST; Chinese: 台灣聯合大學系統; Pe̍h-ōe-jī: Tâi-oân Liân-ha̍p Tāi-ha̍k Hē-thóng; lit. 'Taiwan United University System') is a university alliance in Taiwan. The alliance was officially established in 2008 with the approval from the Ministry of Education. There are four member institutions in the alliance: National Tsing Hua University, National Yang Ming Chiao Tung University, National Cheng Chi University, and National Central University.

== Rankings ==
Rankings of the member institutions of the University System of Taiwan
Institution	2020 ARWU World	2021 QS World	2021 THE World	2021 U.S. News	2021 QS Asia	2020 THE Asia	2020 THE Emerging Economies	2020 Eduniversal
National Tsing Hua University	401-500	168	351-400	363	33	46	29	NR
National Yang Ming Chiao Tung University								
National Cheng Chi University	501-600	298	401-500	913	113	100	91	4 Palmes
National Central University	701-800	465	801-1000	648	67	201-250	158	NR

== See also ==
- List of universities in Taiwan
- University alliances in Taiwan
  - Taiwan Comprehensive University System
  - ELECT
  - European Union Centre in Taiwan
  - University System of Taipei
  - National University System of Taiwan
