= European Union Centre in Taiwan =

University alliance in Taiwan

European Union Centre in Taiwan (EUTW university alliance)
- Type: Public and Private
- Established: 2009
- President: President of National Taiwan University
- Location: Taipei (Headquarters), Taiwan
- Campus: Urban and Suburb
- Website: eutw.org.tw

The European Union Centre in Taiwan (EUTW; Chinese: 臺灣歐洲聯盟中心; Pe̍h-ōe-jī: Tâi-oân Au-chiu Liân-bêng Tiong-sim) is part of a global network of European Union Centres of Excellence and a university alliance in Taiwan. Following the launch of EU Centres of Excellence in the US and Canada in 1998, there are now 37 Centres located in Australia, Canada, Hong Kong, Japan, Macao, New Zealand, Russia, South Korea, Taiwan and the United States.

The Taiwan Centre, the first in Eastern Asia, opened in 2009, funded by European Commission. It is a partnership between the European Commission, National Taiwan University, National Chengchi University, National Dong Hwa University, National Chung Hsing University, National Sun Yat-sen University, Fu Jen Catholic University, and Tamkang University. Its aim is to promote knowledge of the European Union and its policies. It organises speaker events, discussions and exhibitions; publishes books, papers and teaching materials; and sends staff to visit schools and colleges in Taiwan.

== History ==
Since 1998, the European Union began establishing European Union Centres (variations in name) at prestigious universities in developed countries around the world. As of 2016, there are 32 such centres around the world, such as United States, Canada, Japan, Korea, Australia, Russia, New Zealand, Taiwan, and Singapore.

In 2008, the European Union Centre in Taiwan consortium consists of seven most comprehensive/internationalization Taiwanese universities, the National Taiwan University signed the Grand Agreement with the European Commission. In 2009, the EUTW university alliance was founded.

== Members ==
#	Institution	City	International affiliation
1	National Taiwan University	Taipei	AACSB-Accredited, AEARU, APRU, ASAIHL, UMAP
2	National Chengchi University	Taipei	AACSB-Accredited, AALAU, APSIA, BGS, EQUIS, UMAP
3	Fu Jen Catholic University	New Taipei	AACSB-Accredited, AALAU, ACUCA, ACPHA-Accredited, AJCU-EAO, APQN, AWS Educate, BGS, GLP, IAJBS, IFCU, UMAP
4	Tamkang University	New Taipei	IAU, UMAP
5	National Chung Hsing University	Taichung	AACSB-Accredited, UMAP
6	National Sun Yat-sen University	Kaohsiung	AACSB-Accredited, UMAP
7	National Dong Hwa University	Hualien	AACSB-Accredited, UMAP

== See also ==
- List of universities in Taiwan
- University alliances in Taiwan
  - University System of Taiwan
  - Taiwan Comprehensive University System
  - University System of Taipei
  - National University System of Taiwan
  - ELECT
  - National Taiwan University System (NTU Triangle)
- Public Ivy
