= National University System of Taiwan =

University alliance in Taiwan

- Founded: 2021
- Commissioner: Fuh-Sheng Shieu (since April 2021)
- No. of teams: 11
- Headquarters: Taichung
- Region: Central & Southern Taiwan
- Website: nust.edu.tw

The National University System of Taiwan (NUST; Chinese: 臺灣國立大學系統; Pe̍h-ōe-jī: Tâi-oân Kok-li̍p Tāi-ha̍k Hē-thóng; lit. 'Taiwan National University System') is a university alliance in Taiwan. The alliance, led by the National Chung Hsing University in Taichung, was officially founded in 2021 with the approval from the Ministry of Education. There are 11 member institutions in the alliance.

== Members ==
Institution	Location	Undergraduates	Postgraduates	Academic Staff	Abbreviation
National Chi Nan University	Puli, Nantou County				NCNU
National Chung Hsing University	South District, Taichung				NCHU
National Chiayi University	East District, Chiayi				NCYU
National Dong Hwa University	Shoufeng, Hualien County				NDHU
National Taichung University of Education	West District, Taichung				NTCU
National Taiwan University of Sport	North District, Taichung				NTUS
National Changhua University of Education	Changhua, Changhua County				NCUE
National Chin-Yi University of Technology	Taiping District, Taichung				NCUT; Chin-Yi Tech
National United University	Miaoli, Miaoli County				NUU
National Formosa University	Huwei, Yunlin County				NFU
National Yunlin University of Science and Technology	Douliu, Yunlin County				YunTech
National University of Kaohsiung	Nanzih District, Kaohsiung				NUK

== History ==
=== Year founded ===
Institution	Founded as	Founded
NTCU	Taichung Normal School	1899
NCHU	Advanced Academy of Agronomy and Forestry	1919
NCYU	Nat'l Chiayi Institute of Technology; Nat'l Chiayi Teachers College	1919
NTUS	Provincial College of Physical Education	1961
NCUE	Provincial College of Education	1971
Chin-Yi Tech	Chin-Yi Technical Vocational Junior College	1971
NUU	United Industrial and Technological Junior College	1972
NFU	Provincial Yunlin Institute of Technology	1980
YunTech	Nat'l Yunlin Institute of Technology	1991
NDHU	National Dong Hwa University (Provincial Hualien Normal School for National Hualien University of Education)	1994 (1947)
NCNU	National Chi Nan University	1995
NUK	Nat'l University of Kaohsiung	2000

== Academics ==
=== Admissions ===
Admission statistics (2021 Academic Year)
	Approved quota	Applicants	Registration rates
NTCU	1,358	1,380	97.25%
NCNU	1,568	1,630	94.66%
NCHU	4,439	4,618	98.74%
NCYU	3,446	3,308	93.76%
NTUS	779	783	97.03%
NCUE	2,399	2,395	96.42%
Chin-Yi Tech	3,188	3,208	96.71%
NUU	2,111	1,983	93.10%
NFU	3,164	3,053	95.44
YunTech	2,755	2,628	92.41%
NUK	1,580	1,593	96.25%

In response to the sub-replacement fertility and derived admissions problem, national universities which located in Central Taiwan proposed the establishment of "National University System of Taiwan" (NUST), in order to integrate academic resources, achieving higher competitiveness for each school. The NUST plans joint enrollment in future, like University System of Taiwan (UST) and Taiwan Comprehensive University System (TCUS), meanwhile allowed students inter-collegiate course taking, only if registration on one of the member school.

All eleven NUST schools achieved high registration rate in 2021 academic year, nearly equivalent to approved quota by MOE.

=== Rankings ===
Institution	QS World (2022)	QS Asia (2022)	THE World (2022)	THE Asia (2021)	THE Emerging Economies (2022)	THE Impact (2021)	Shanghai Ranking (2021)	U.S. News & World Report
NCNU	-	351-400	1201+	401+	501+	401-600	-	-
NCHU	651-700	118	1201+	301-350	351-400	401-600	901-1000	1160
NDHU	1001-1200	301-350	1001-1200	251–300	301-350	401-600	-	1260
NUU	-	501-550	1201+	-	501+	-	-	-
NCYU	-	-	1201+	401+	501+	-	-	-
NKU		401-450	1201+	401+	501+	601-800	-	-
NCUE	-	401-450	1201+	401+	501+	401-600	-	-
NTCU	-	-	-	-	-	-	-	-
NTUS	-	-	-	-	-	-	-	-
Chin-Yi Tech	-	-	1201+	401+	401-500	601-800	-	-
YunTech		351-400	1001-1200	251-300	201-250	301-400	-	1730
NFU	-	-	-	-	-	-	-	-

== See also ==
- List of universities in Taiwan
- University alliances in Taiwan
  - University System of Taiwan
  - Taiwan Comprehensive University System
  - ELECT
  - European Union Centre in Taiwan
  - University System of Taipei
