= Excellent Long-Established University Consortium of Taiwan =

University alliance in Taiwan

Excellent Long-Established University Consortium of Taiwan 優久聯盟
- Type: Private
- Established: 24 May 2016
- Location: Taipei; New Taipei; Taichung, Taiwan
- Campus: Urban and Suburb
- Website: http://u9.tku.edu.tw/

The Excellent Long-Established University Consortium of Taiwan (ELECT or U12 Consortium, Chinese: 優久聯盟; Pe̍h-ōe-jī: Iu-kú Liân-bêng), formerly named as U9 Consortium, a university alliance in Taiwan. Its members are nine private universities located in New Taipei City and Taipei City and extended with three universities in Central Taiwan, with 12 universities in total, by cooperation including offering joint academic courses. Students of Member Universities can cross-register up to two classes per academic session.

The member schools are equipped with specific strength and academic specialization networking, and viewed as some of historical partner universities or runner-up universities in lieu of comparing academic specialization to top universities in Taiwan, and evaluated among the best private universities in Taiwan.

== Rankings ==
ELECT members
Institution	ARWU World (2020)	QS World (2022)	THE World (2021)	U.S. News (2021)	QS Asia (2021)	THE Asia (2021)	THE Emerging Economies (2020)	Eduniversal (2020)
Chinese Culture	—N/a	—N/a	—N/a	—N/a	—N/a	—N/a	—N/a	—N/a
Chung Yuan Christian	—N/a	1001-1200	1001+	—N/a	261-270	251-300	251-300	—N/a
Feng Chia	—N/a	1001-1200	1001+	—N/a	226	351-400	301-350	—N/a
Fu Jen Catholic	—N/a	1001-1200	801-1000	1381	251-260	168	201-250	3 Palmes
Ming Chuan	—N/a	—N/a	1001+	—N/a	401-450	401+	401-500	—N/a
Providence	—N/a	—N/a	—N/a	—N/a	—N/a	—N/a	—N/a	—N/a
Shih Chien	—N/a	—N/a	—N/a	—N/a	451-500	—N/a	—N/a	—N/a
Shih Hsin	—N/a	—N/a	—N/a	—N/a	—N/a	—N/a	—N/a	—N/a
Soochow	—N/a	1201+	—N/a	—N/a	281-290	—N/a	—N/a	—N/a
Taipei Medical	601-700	407	301-350	888	90	30	28	—N/a
Tamkang	—N/a	1201+	1001+	1455	271-280	401+	401-500	—N/a
Tatung	—N/a	—N/a	—N/a	—N/a	—N/a	—N/a	—N/a	—N/a
Tunghai	—N/a	1201+	1201+	1735	301-350	401+	401–500	—N/a

== See also ==
- List of universities in Taiwan
- University alliances in Taiwan
  - University System of Taiwan
  - National University System of Taiwan
  - Taiwan Comprehensive University System
  - European Union Centre in Taiwan
  - University System of Taipei
