= Taiwan Comprehensive University System =

University alliance in Taiwan

The Taiwan Comprehensive University System
- Type: Public
- Established: 2012
- President: Wang Fan-sen
- Faculty: 3,357
- Students: 61,194
- Location: 4 cities, Taiwan
- Campus: Urban and Suburb
- Website: tcus.edu.tw

The Taiwan Comprehensive University System (Chinese: 臺灣綜合大學系統; Pe̍h-ōe-jī: Tâi-oân Chong-ha̍p Tāi-ha̍k Hē-thóng), informally called Taiwan T4 Alliance, is a research-led university alliance in Taiwan.

In 2016, TCUS signed a memorandum of cooperation with TU9 in Germany.

== Members ==
National Chung Cheng University
CCU, Chiayi County
The first suburban college town university in Taiwan.
National Chung Hsing University
NCHU, Taichung
The largest comprehensive university in Central Taiwan.
National Cheng Kung University
NCKU, Tainan
The largest comprehensive university in Southern Taiwan, one of six Designated National Research University.
National Sun Yat-sen University
NSYSU, Kaohsiung
The first "national" comprehensive university in Southern Taiwan, one of six Designated National Research University.

== Rankings ==
Taiwan Comprehensive University System
Institution	2020 ARWU World	2021 QS World	2021 THE World	2021 U.S. News	2021 QS Asia	2020 THE Asia	2020 THE Emerging Economies	2020 Eduniversal	2009 MINES ParisTech
NCKU	301-400	234	501-600	635	42	103	45	2 Palmes	216
NSYSU	601-700	416	801-1000	949	73	201-250	162	4 Palmes	216
NCHU	901-1000	601-650	1001+	1078	112	301-350	301-350	—N/a	—N/a
CCU	—N/a	801-1000	1001+	1476	161	351-400	351-400	—N/a	—N/a

== See also ==
- TU9
- List of universities in Taiwan
- University alliances in Taiwan
  - National University System of Taiwan
  - University System of Taiwan
  - ELECT
  - European Union Centre in Taiwan
  - University System of Taipei
