= USTP =

USTP may refer to:

- University of São Tomé and Príncipe, a university in São Tomé and Príncipe
- University of Science and Technology of Southern Philippines, a state university in the Philippines
- University System of Taipei, a university alliance in Taiwan
- United States Transhumanist Party
- United States Taxpayers Party, the former name of the United States Constitution Party.
