= List of university mergers in Taiwan =

University mergers in Taiwan are a result of declining student numbers, caused by low birth rates and an oversupply of universities, both public and private.

== List of newly formed universities ==
- National Chiayi University (NCYU)
  - Established in 2000 through the merger of National Chiayi Institute of Technology (NCIT) and National Chiayi Teachers College (NCTC)
- University of Taipei (UT)
  - Established in 2013 through the merger of Taipei Municipal University of Education (TMUE) and Taipei Physical Education College (TPEC)
- National Pingtung University (NPTU)
  - Established in 2014 through the merger of National Pingtung University of Education (NPUE) and National Pingtung Institute of Commerce (NPIC)
- National Kaohsiung University of Science and Technology (NKUST)
  - Established in 2018 through the merger of three national universities: National Kaohsiung First University of Science and Technology (NKFUST), National Kaohsiung University of Applied Sciences (KUAS), and National Kaohsiung Marine University (NKMU)
  - After the merger, NKUST became the second largest national university in Taiwan based on the number of students.
- National Yang Ming Chiao Tung University (NYCU)
  - Established in 2021 through the merger of National Chiao Tung University (NCTU) and National Yang-Ming University (NYMU)
  - Regarded as the merger of two top-tier universities in Taiwan

== List of university incorporations (absorption mergers) ==
- National Taiwan Normal University (NTNU)
  - In 2006, National University of Preparatory School for Overseas Chinese Students (NUPS) was incorporated into National Taiwan Normal University (NTNU), becoming National Taiwan Normal University Academy of Preparatory Programs for Overseas Chinese Students
- National Dong Hwa University (NDHU)
  - In 2008, National Hualien University of Education (Hua-Shih) was incorporated into National Dong Hwa University (NDHU), becoming National Dong Hwa University Hua-Shih College of Education
- National Taichung University of Science and Technology (NTCUST)
  - In 2011, National Taichung Nursing College was incorporated into National Taichung Institute of Technology (NTIT) and then picked the name and became National Taichung University of Science and Technology Minsheng Campus
- National Tsing Hua University (NTHU)
  - In 2016, National Hsinchu University of Education (NHCUE) was incorporated into National Tsing Hua University (NTHU), becoming National Tsing Hua University Nanda Campus
- National Taiwan University of Science and Technology (NTUST)
  - In 2023, Hwa Hsia University of Technology (HHUT) was incorporated into National Taiwan University of Science and Technology (NTUST), becoming National Taiwan University of Science and Technology Hwa Hsia Campus
  - Regarded as the first merger of public and private universities in Taiwan

== See also ==
- List of universities in Taiwan
