= FYU =

FYU may refer to:

- Fooyin University, in Taiwan
- Fort Yukon Airport, in Alaska, United States
