= Chyung Ay =

Chinese agricultural engineer

- 艾群
- Born: Taiwan
- Education: National Chung-Hsing University (BS); National Taiwan University (MS); University of Wisconsin-Madison (PhD)

Chyung Ay (Chinese: 艾群) is a Taiwanese agricultural engineer. He has retired from university professor.

== Early life and education ==
Born in Taiwan, Chyung Ay was educated at National Chung Hsing University, graduating with an undergraduate degree in 1980. He then studied for a master's degree at National Taiwan University, graduating in 1982. In 1992, he received his Ph.D. degree in food engineering from the University of Wisconsin-Madison in the United States.

== Career ==
In 1997, Chyung Ay joined the Department of Biomechatronic Engineering at National Chiayi University. From 2000 - 2006, He became Dean of College of Science and Engineering at the university. In 2014, he was appointed university vice president. In 2018, he became the university president. In January 2022, he has retired from university.

== Awards ==
Chyung Ay received the academic achievement award and education achievement award from the Chinese Institute of Agricultural Machinery, Taiwan in 2001 and 2007 respectively.
