= Master of International Health =

Postgraduate programme in Copenhagen

The Master of International Health (MIH) is a postgraduate programme offered by the Copenhagen School of Global Health at the University of Copenhagen. The programme focuses on public health issues in low and middle-income societies – including a broad range of theories within public health, medicine, epidemiology, anthropology, political science, management, organization, and the studies of climate change. With the aim of providing mobility, the master students can choose to enrol one or more modules at the TropEd Masters Programme or the European Master of Science in International Health, Erasmus Mundus.

In Kenya, the Master of Science in International Health (MIH) is offered at Jomo Kenyatta University of Agriculture and Technology (JKUAT). The course comprises the following units which are taken in the first year of study; Epidemiology, Biostatistics and Demography, Research Methods, Computer Applications in Health Research, Disaster Management, Maternal and Child Health and Nutrition, Global Patterns of Diseases, Control and Prevention of Communicable Diseases, Law, Ethics and Human Rights, Health Informatics and Travel Medicine, Health Systems and Society, and finally Planning and Evaluation. In the second year of study, the student is required to carry out a research project, leading to a Thesis. Thereafter, after satisfying the board of examiners, the student can graduate with a Masters's degree in International Health.
