= University System of Taipei =

University alliance in Taiwan

The University System of Taipei (USTP; Chinese: 臺北聯合大學系統; Pe̍h-ōe-jī: Tâi-pak Liân-ha̍p Tāi-ha̍k Hē-thóng) is a university alliance in Taiwan. Its constituents are:

- National Taipei University (NTPU)
- National Taipei University of Technology (NTUT)
- Taipei Medical University (TMU)
- National Taiwan Ocean University (NTOU)

== Rankings ==
University System of Taipei
Institution	2020 ARWU World	2021 QS World	2021 THE World	2021 U.S. News	2020 QS Asia	2020 THE Asia	2020 THE Emerging Economies
TMU	601-700	387	301-350	888	74	35	28
Taipei Tech	—N/a	488	801-1000	1163	95	201-250	171
NTOU	—N/a	—N/a	1001+	1396	187	301-350	251-300
NTPU	—N/a	—N/a	1001+	—N/a	281-290	301-350	301-350

== See also ==
- List of universities in Taiwan
- University alliances in Taiwan
  - University System of Taiwan
  - Taiwan Comprehensive University System
  - National University System of Taiwan
  - ELECT
  - European Union Centre in Taiwan
