= Cardinal Tien College of Healthcare and Management =

Junior college in Xindian, New Taipei, Taiwan

- 耕莘健康管理專科學校
- Type: private, junior college
- Established: August 1971
- Location: Xindian, New Taipei, Taiwan; 24.977038°N 121.537064°E
- Website: Official website

Cardinal Tien College of Healthcare and Management (CTCN; traditional Chinese: 耕莘健康管理專科學校; simplified Chinese: 耕莘健康管理专科学校; pinyin: Gēngshēn Jiànkāng Guǎnlǐ Zhuānkē Xuéxiào; Pe̍h-ōe-jī: Keng-sin Kiān-khong Koán-lí Choan-kho Ha̍k-hāu) is a private, Roman Catholic, junior college in Xindian District, New Taipei and Sanxing Township, Yilan County, Taiwan.

The college was initially named the Cardinal Tien College of Medicine and Nursing, but it was later renamed the Cardinal Tien College of Healthcare and Management in 2005 to reflect its expanded scope of programs.

CTCHM offers a range of undergraduate and graduate programs in healthcare and management, including nursing, medical laboratory science, occupational therapy, physical therapy, healthcare management, and long-term care. The college also offers continuing education programs for healthcare professionals.

== History ==
CTCN was originally established in August 1971.

Yilan Campus was operate in 2006.

== Faculties ==
- Department of Cosmetic Applications and Management
- Department of Digital Media Design
- Department of Early Childhood Educare
- Department of Health and Hospitality
- Department of Health Beauty
- Department of Information Management
- Department of Nursing
- Holistic Education Center

== Transportation ==
The college is accessible within walking distance West from Qizhang Station of the Taipei Metro.

And the Yilan Campus has a Kuo-Guang Bus Station (Route 1794A/1794B) connect to TR Luodong Station.

== See also ==
- List of universities in Taiwan
