= University alliances in Taiwan =

-

There are several major university alliances in Taiwan, mostly organized in 2002, intentionally modelled after other university systems. The key steps in such integration may include pooling of resources such as libraries and some co-ordinated budgeting.

== Current Alliances ==
| Name | abbr. | Chinese name | Member Universities | Website |
|---|---|---|---|---|
| University Academic Alliance in Taiwan | UAAT | 臺灣大學學術聯盟 | Top 12 universities chosen by the Ministry of Education (Taiwan): National Taiwan University, National Cheng Kung University, National Tsing Hua University, National Yang Ming Chiao Tung University, National Taiwan University of Science and Technology, National Taipei University of Technology, National Taiwan Normal University, National Sun Yat-sen University, Taipei Medical University, National Chengchi University, National Central University, and National Chung Hsing University. | https://english.moe.gov.tw/cp-117-39360-b1bc7-1.html |
| Excellent Long-Established University Consortium of Taiwan | ELECT | 優久聯盟 | 12 private universities in North. | https://u9.tku.edu.tw/ |
| European Union Centre in Taiwan | EUTW | 臺灣歐洲聯盟中心 | 7 comprehensive universities. | http://www.eutw.org.tw/ |
| Joint Private Medical Universities Admissions System | JPMUAS | 私立醫學校院聯合招考 | 6 school of medicine. | |
| Pan-Pacific University League | PPUL | 泛太平洋大學聯盟 | 6 Complementary Universities next to Pan-Pacific Ocean. | https://pan-pacific.ndhu.edu.tw/ |
| Taiwan Comprehensive University System | TCUS | 臺灣綜合大學系統 | 4 research universities in South Central : National Cheng Kung University, National Chung Cheng University, National Sun Yat-sen University, National Chung Hsing University | https://www.tcus.edu.tw/ |
| University System of Taipei | USTP | 臺北聯合大學系統 | 4 public universities in North: National Taipei University of Technology, National Taipei University, Taipei Medical University, and National Taiwan Ocean University | https://ustp.ntpu.edu.tw |
| University System of Taiwan | UST | 臺灣聯合大學系統 | 4 research universities in North. | https://www.ust.edu.tw/ |
| National Taiwan University System | NTUS | 國立臺灣大學系統 | 3 universities in Taipei City: National Taiwan University, National Taiwan Normal University, National Taiwan University of Science and Technology. | https://triangle.ntu.edu.tw/ |
| National University System of Taiwan | NUST (or T11) | 臺灣國立大學系統 | 11 public universities in Central Taiwan. | https://nust.edu.tw/ |

== Defunct Alliances ==
- Taiwan Joint Normal University System (or Taiwan United Education University System, 臺灣聯合師範大學系統)
- Taiwan University System

== See also ==
- List of universities in Taiwan
