= Shih Chien University =

University in Taiwan

Coordinates: 25.0892°N 121.5458°E

- 實踐大學
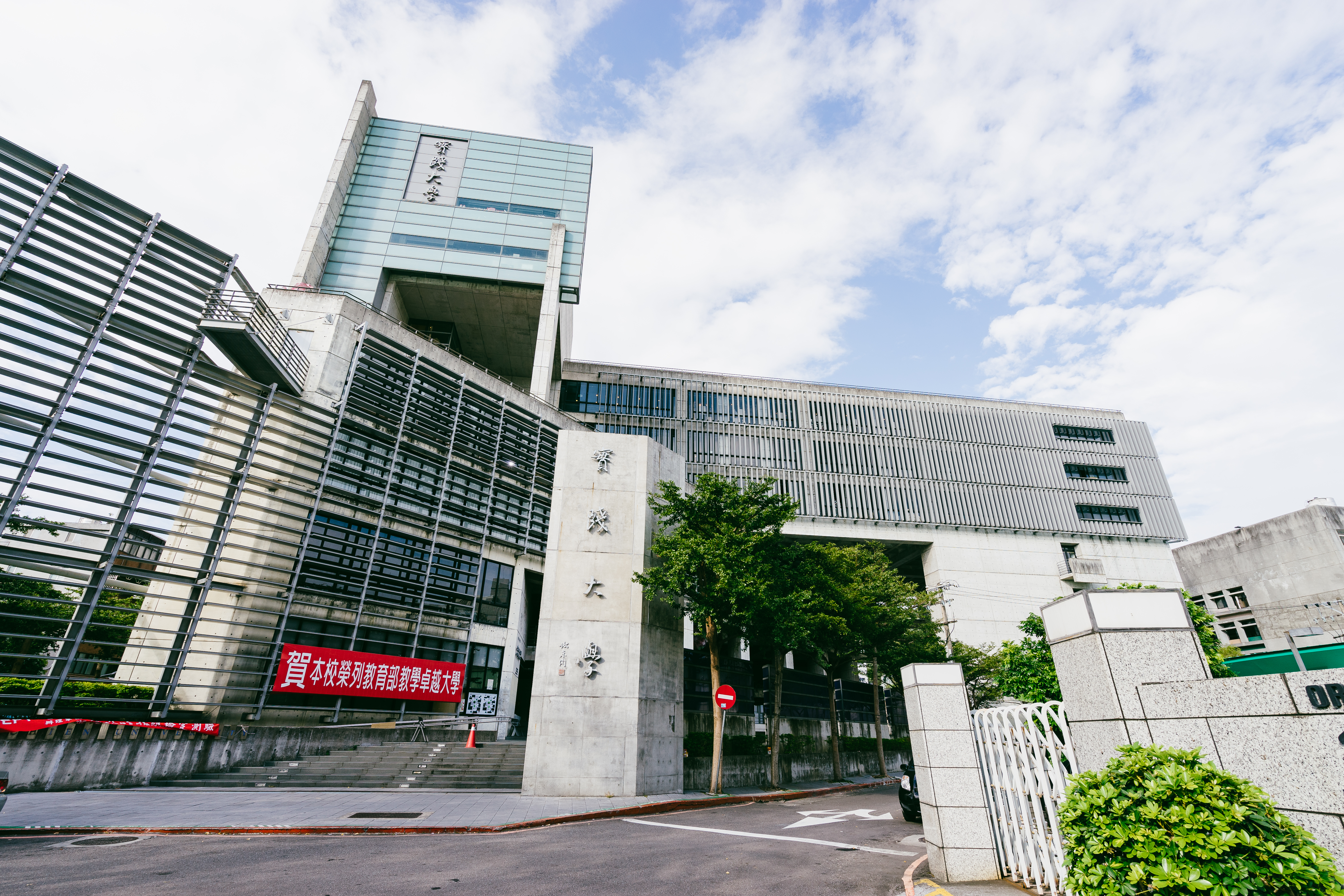
- Motto: 力行實踐，修齊治平
- Motto in English: Knowledge is the beginning of practice. Doing is the completion of knowing.
- Type: Private
- Established: 1958; 68 years ago
- Affiliations: U12 Consortium
- Chairman: Milton Mung-Shiung Shieh
- President: Michael J. K. Chen
- Academic staff: 387 (2008, full-time); 837 (2008, part-time)
- Administrative staff: 301 (2008)
- Students: 9,538 (May 2009)
- Location: Taipei and Kaohsiung, Taiwan
- Website: usc.edu.tw

Shih Chien University
- Traditional Chinese: 實踐大學
- Simplified Chinese: 实践大学
Transcriptions
Standard Mandarin
- Hanyu Pinyin: Shíjiàn Dàxué
Southern Min
- Hokkien POJ: Si̍t-chiān Tāi-ha̍k

Shih Chien University (USC; Chinese: 實踐大學; pinyin: Shíjiàn Dàxué; lit. 'Practitioner University') is a private university with its main campus in Zhongshan District, Taipei, Taiwan. It operates a second campus in Neimen District, Kaohsiung.

== History ==
It was established in 1958 by Hsieh Tung-min. Formerly known as the Shih Chien School of Home Economics. In 1979 the school was renamed the Shih Chien School of Home Economics and Economics, in 1991 the school was upgraded to become the Shih Chien College of Design and Management. In 1997 the school was again upgraded to become Shih Chien University.

== Academics ==
Shih Chien University rankings

Regional – Overall
- QS Asia: 701–750 (2024)

=== Organization ===
Taipei Campus; Kaohsiung Campus

- College of Human Ecology
  - Department of Food and Beverage Management
  - Department of Social Work
  - Department of Music
  - Department of Family Studies and Child Development
  - Department of Food Science, Nutrition, and Nutraceutical Biotechnology
- College of Design
  - Department of Fashion Design
  - Department of Architecture
  - Department of Industrial Design
  - Department of Communication Design
- College of Management
  - Graduate Institute of Creative Industries
  - Department of Business Administration
  - Department of Information Technology and Management
  - Department of Finance and Banking
  - Department of Risk Management and Insurance
  - Department of International Business
  - Department of Accounting
  - Department of Applied Foreign Languages
- College of Business and Information
  - Department of Accounting Information System
  - Department of International Business Management
  - Department of International Trade
  - Department of Marketing Management
  - Department of Finance
  - Department of Information Management
  - Department of Information Technology and Communication
  - Department of Computer Simulation and Design
- College of Culture and Creativity
  - Bachelor Program in Computer Animation
  - Department of Tourism Management
  - Department of Recreation Management
  - Department of Fashion Design and Merchandising
  - Department of Fashion Styling and Design Communication
  - Department of Applied English
  - Department of Applied Chinese
  - Department of Applied Japanese

=== Research Units ===
Taipei Campus; Kaohsiung Campus

- College of Human Ecology
  - Research Center for Early Care
- College of Design
  - Studio for Design Psychology
- College of Management
  - Research Center for Financial Development
  - Cardif Bank Research Center for Insurance

== Other education facilities ==
Taipei Campus; Kaohsiung Campus

- Kindergarten

== Notable alumni ==
- Ko Chia-yen, actress
- Berant Zhu, actor
- Summer Meng, actress
- Ashin, singer

== Sister schools ==
- Saimaa University of Applied Sciences, Finland
- Hanze University of Applied Sciences, Groningen, the Netherlands
- University of Applied Sciences Würzburg-Schweinfurt, Germany
- Northumbria University, UK
- University of Cumbria, UK
- Kwantlen Polytechnic University, Canada
- University of Wisconsin-River Falls, USA
- Dallas Baptist University, USA
- RMIT University, Australia
- Unitec Institute of Technology, New Zealand
- University of California, Davis, USA

== See also ==
- List of universities in Taiwan
- U12 Consortium
