= University Mobility in Asia and the Pacific =

Australian-based international university

University Mobility in Asia and the Pacific (UMAP) is a voluntary regional association of government, non-government and/or university representatives of the higher education sector established in 1993 to enhance cooperation and exchange of people and expertise through increased mobility of higher education students and staff. UMAP has been endorsed by Asia-Pacific Economic Cooperation and member countries are implementing UMAP projects.

== History ==
In 1991 the movement of University Mobility in Asia and the Pacific (UMAP) was initiated when Australian Vice-Chancellors' Committee proposed and sponsored two conferences to promote the discussion on educational cooperation in Asia and the Pacific, inviting representatives of institutes of higher education from Hong Kong, Japan, Taiwan and Korea. The first meeting was held in April 1991 in Hong Kong and the second meeting was held in September 1991 in Canberra. During the second meeting, representatives of 18 countries and territories in the region agreed to establish themselves as a Reference Group, and this was termed the First Reference Group Meeting. Additional annual meetings were held between 1992 and 1996, at Seoul, Taipei, Osaka and Auckland. In the fourth meeting, participants called on Member governments to set up a central scholarship fund to encourage mobility in the region and Asia-Pacific Economic Cooperation started publicly supporting UMAP. In the last meeting held in 1996, the location of UMAP International Secretariat was discussed and decided to establish in Japan.

Between 2011 and 2015, the location for the International Secretariat was moved to Fu Jen Catholic University in Taiwan, and moved to Toyo University in Japan in 2016. However UMAP Taiwan National Secretariat is still in Fu Jen.

=== Aims ===
"UMAP aims to achieve enhanced international understanding through increased mobility of university students and staff".

== UMAP Members ==
Membership is open to countries/territories in the Asia-Pacific region. Members can be represented by government, department or minister of education, individual university or university umbrella organization. However, individual persons are not eligible to become members.

- Eligible Countries / Territories
- Full Member Countries / Territories
- UMAP participating Universities

== Governance and Budget ==
The governing authority is UMAP Board. The board is composed by representatives from each of UMAP Full Members. Each of the Full Members has a voting right, however Secretary General of the Board cannot vote.

Annual budget is prepared in US dollars and UMAP Members need to make a contribution according to the budget. Members can make additional voluntary contribution. These contributions can be funding, facilities or resources.

== Exchange ==
UMAP exchange program is a two-way student exchange and it is for undergraduate and postgraduate students in all disciplines to undertake a minimum of one semester or maximum of two semesters towards their degree in universities overseas, with credit transfer managed by UMAP and cooperating institutions.

=== Home Universities Responsibilities ===
- Selection of students and staff
- Approval of study program, including any necessary language training
- Determine and allocate financial support to participating students and staff
- Provide preparatory courses prior to the departure
- Recognize work completed overseas for credit towards their degree

=== Host Universities Responsibilities ===
- Waive tuition fees to participating student and staff
- Provide the approved and agreed study program
- Evaluate the performance of participants and report to Home Universities
- Provide appropriate counseling and support services
- Assist students and staff with accommodation
- Ensure that appropriate health cover is arranged

=== Exchange Agreements and Funding ===
UMAP does not offer individual exchanges, however UMAP countries/territories fund national UMAP programs. Under the agreement between countries/territories, students’ fees are waived and credit transfer will be made under UMAP credit transfer program. Exchange funding agreements are between the host and home universities. Institution-to-institution agreements covers the maintenance of scholarship benefits, eligibility for government funding assistance and health cover costs.

For example, Australian universities receive A$5,000 per student that applies to UMAP exchange program in order to subsidise the cost of the student’s participation. In addition, universities that receive funding are required to complete a report in order to receive funding from their government. This will vary depending on the agreement between home and host universities, countries/territories.

== UMAP Credit Transfer Scheme (UCTS) ==
UMAP has developed a pilot UMAP Credit Transfer Scheme (UCTS) to facilitate greater student mobility in the region by providing a framework for establishing credit transfer arrangements. The UCTS objective is to ensure effective credit transfer for students undertaking exchange program in universities from UMAP countries/territories.

== Scholarships ==
During 2002-2005 UMAP provided scholarships for student in members’ countries/territories universities. However, the program is temporarily closed until further notice.

== Mobility Programs ==
- Student Connection Online
- Language and Culture Program
- Academic and Research Mobility Forum
- Vice President Forum (2009)
- Alumni Forum

== Similar program ==
The Erasmus Programme (European Community Action Scheme for the Mobility of University Students) is a European Union student exchange program. UMAP and the Erasmus Programme are regional associations and similarities can be found between these two programs, especially in the credit transfer and tuition fee waiver scheme where UMAP adopted a similar approach to facilitate student mobility.

There are some differences between these programs.

	UMAP	Erasmus
Study period	One semester to one year	Three months to one year
Participants	UMAP member/Participating universities	Citizen of one of the countries in the Lifelong Learning Programme 2007-2013

== See also ==
- UMAP Credit Transfer Scheme
- Erasmus programme
- Erasmus Mundus
- Student exchange program
- Academic mobility
