= Tzu Chi University =

Buddhist university in Hualien City, Taiwan

- 慈濟大學
- Motto: 慈悲喜捨 (Pe̍h-ōe-jī: Chû-pi Hí-siá)
- Motto in English: Kindness, Compassion, Joy, and Unselfish Giving
- Type: Private
- Established: 1994
- Affiliations: JPMAS
- Religious affiliation: Buddhist (Tzu Chi)
- Endowment: NT$ 1.2 billion ($ 40 million)
- President: Ingrid Y. Liu
- Academic staff: 266
- Undergraduates: 3,308
- Postgraduates: 579
- Location: Hualien City, Taiwan, Taiwan; 23.99353°N 121.58918°E
- Campus: Suburban, 0.69 km², (168.28 acres)
- Colors: Green and Silver
- Website: tcu.edu.tw

Tzu Chi University
- Traditional Chinese: 慈濟大學
Transcriptions
Standard Mandarin
- Hanyu Pinyin: Cíjì Dàxué
- Wade–Giles: Tz’u² Chi⁴ Ta⁴-hsüeh²
- Tongyong Pinyin: Cíhjì Dàsyué
Southern Min
- Hokkien POJ: Chû-chè Tāi-ha̍k

Tzu Chi University (TCU; Chinese: 慈濟大學; Wade–Giles: Tz’u^{2} Chi^{4} Ta^{4}-hsüeh^{2}; Pe̍h-ōe-jī: Chû-chè Tāi-ha̍k) is a private university in Hualien City, Hualien County, Taiwan. It was founded by the Tzu Chi Foundation (NGO). TCU has strong ties with Buddhist Tzu Chi Medical Foundation as well as five teaching hospitals in other parts of Taiwan.

In 2024, Tzu Chi University of Science and Technology was merged as Jinanguo Campus.

== History ==
The institution was established as the Tzu Chi Medical College in April 1994. Humanities and social science students have been accepted since 1998, when the name was changed to Tzu Chi College of Medicine and Humanities. In July 2000, the name was changed to Tzu Chi University.

== Rankings ==
Tzu Chi University rankings

Global – Overall
- THE World: 1201–1500 (2023)

Regional – Overall
- THE Asia: 401–500 (2023)

National – Overall
- THE National: 18–29 (2023)

== Organization ==
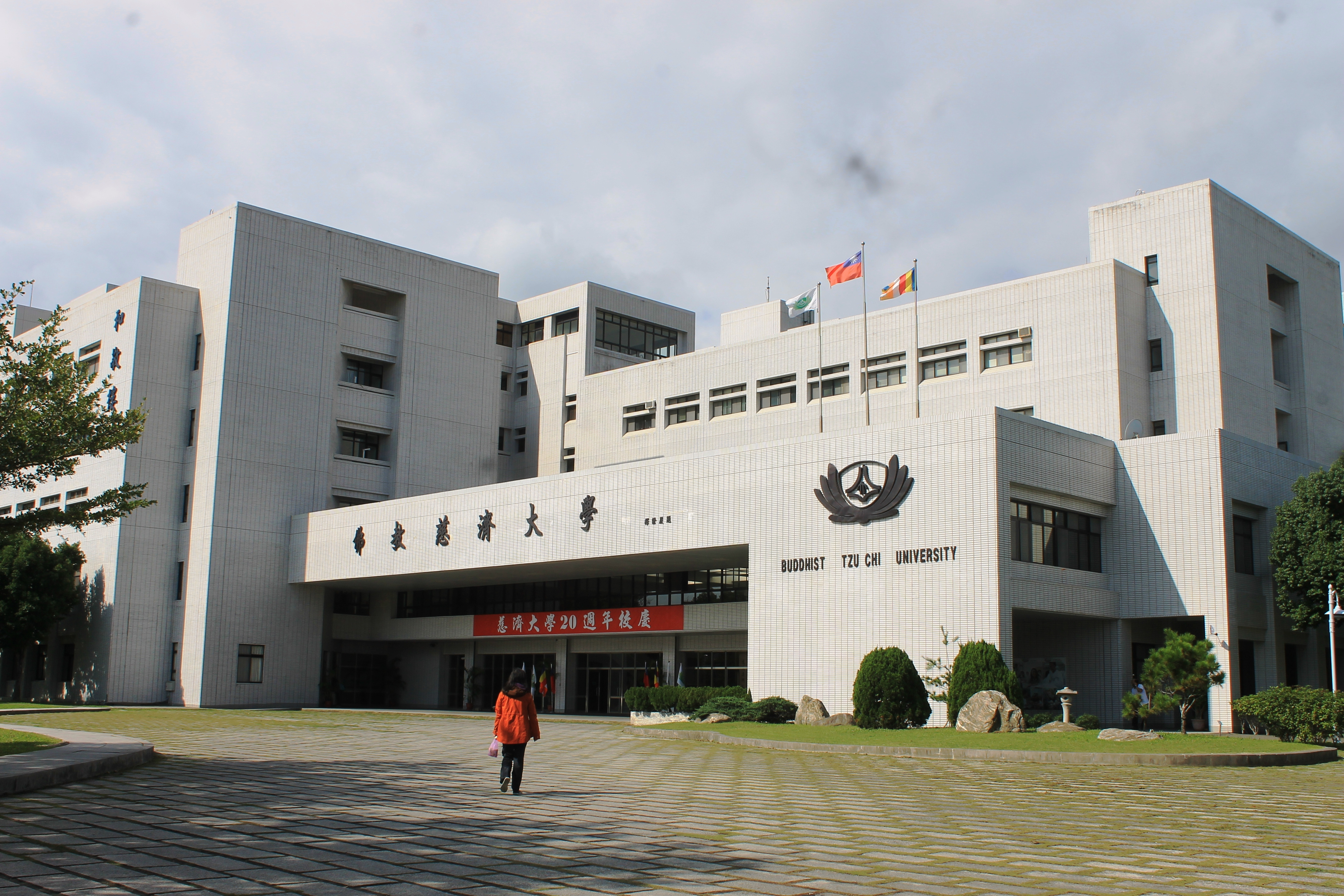
The Buddhist Tzu Chi University as seen from the main gate.

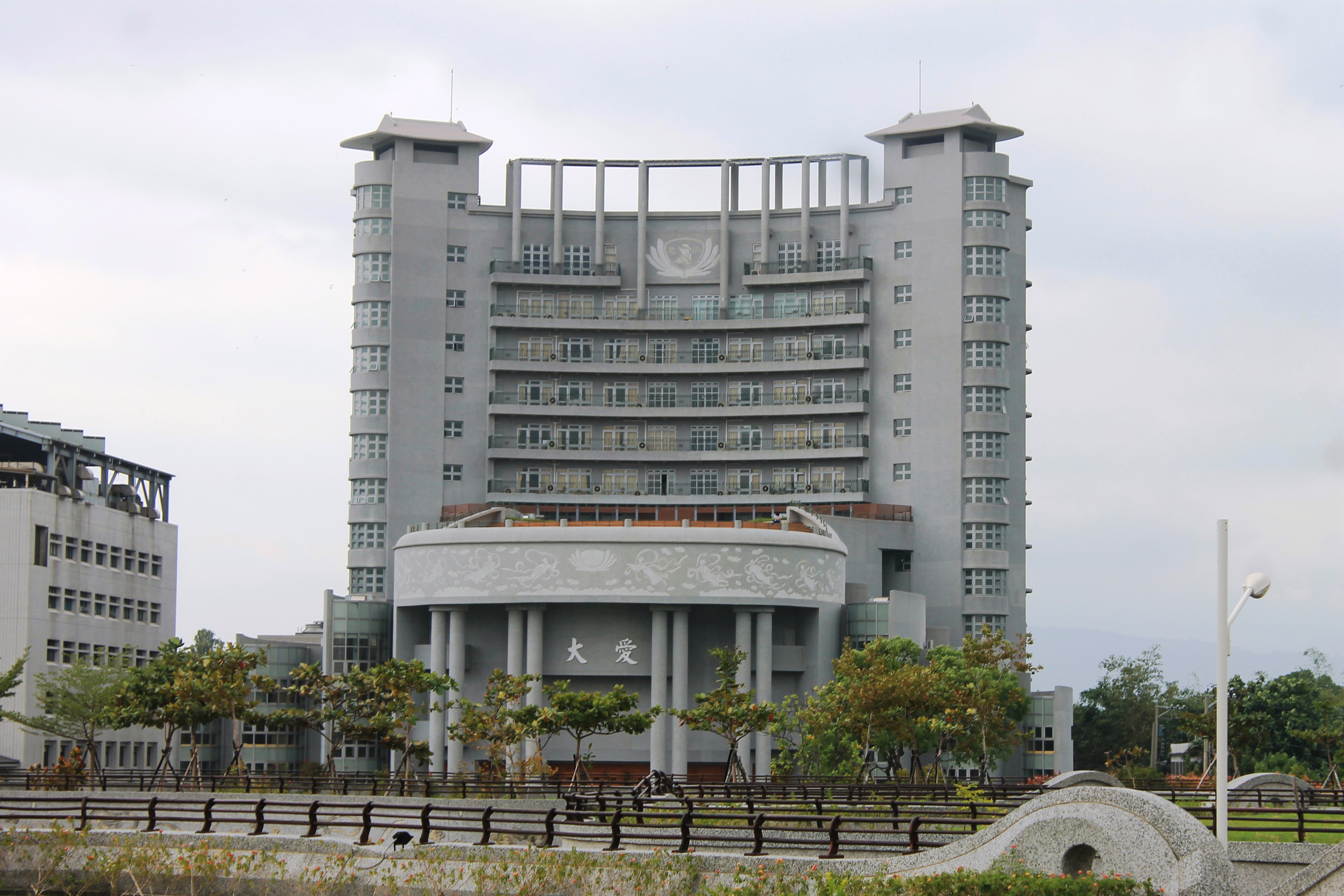
The Da Ai building (Great Love building)

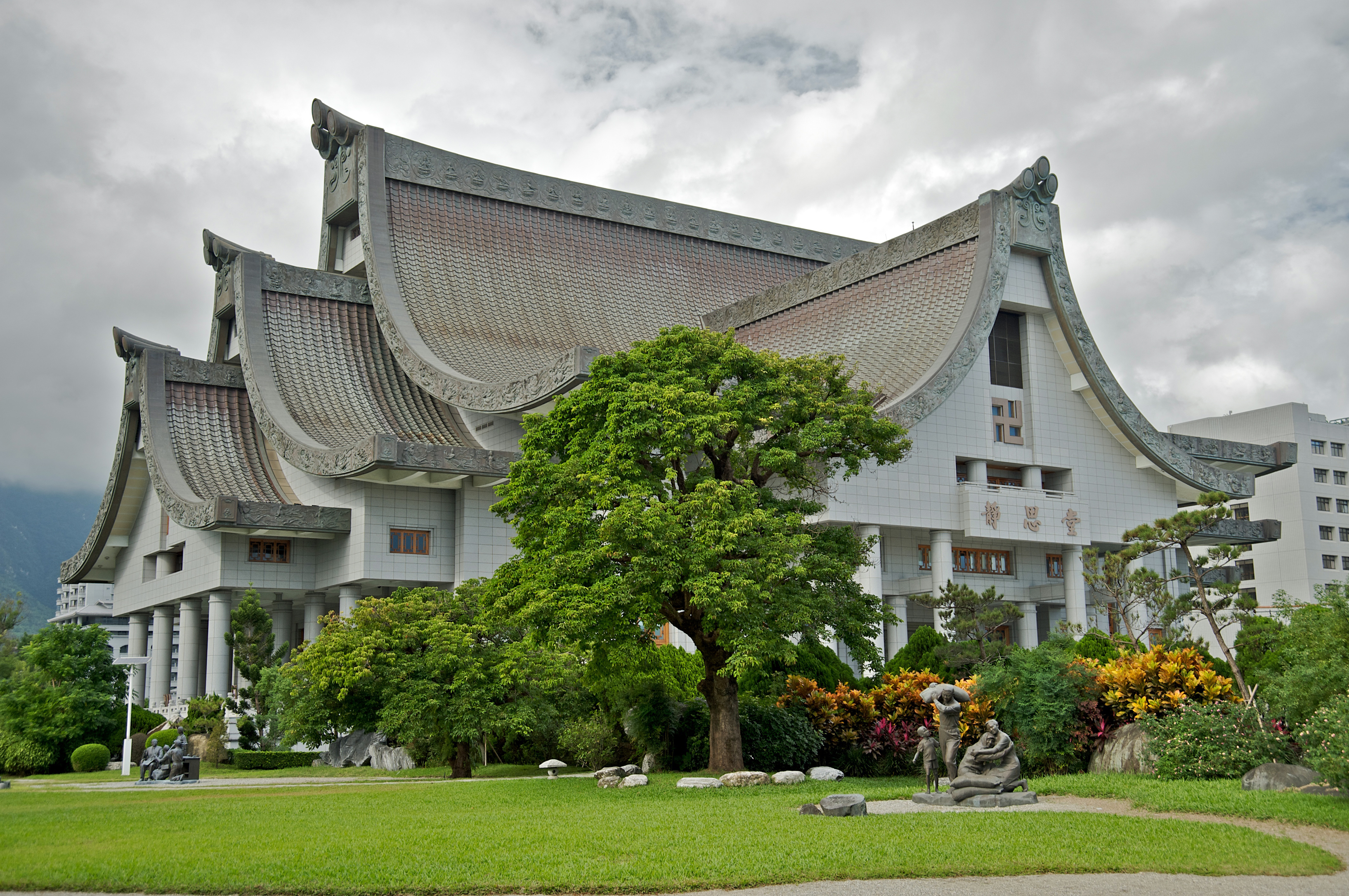
The Jing Si Hall

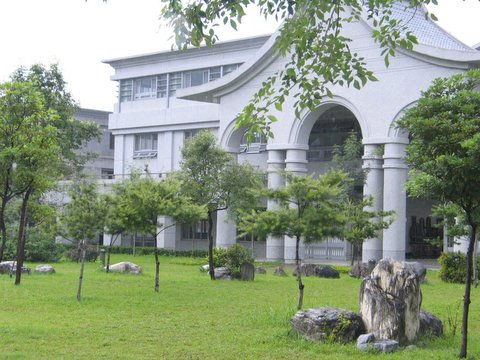
College of Humanities & Social Science

Tzu Chi University is headed by a president and a board of trustees. The university is organized into four colleges that contain 18 research institutes and 17 academic departments.

=== College of Medicine ===
- School of Medicine
- Master Program in Biochemistry
- Master Program in Microbiology and Immunology
- Master Program in Physiological and Anatomical Medicine
- Master/PhD Program in Pharmacology and Toxicology
- Graduate Institute of Medical Science
- Department of Nursing
- Department of Medical Informatics
- Department of Public Health
- Department of Laboratory Medicine & Biotechnology
- Department of Physical Therapy
- Department of Life Science
- Graduate Institute of Life Science
- Department of Molecular Biology and Human Genetics
- Graduate Institute of Molecular Biology and Human Genetics

=== College of Humanities & Social Science ===
- Department of Human Development & Psychology
- Department of Social Work
- Institute of Religion
- Institute of Social Work
- Department of Oriental Philology

=== College of Education & Communication ===
- Department of Communication
- Department of Child Development and Family Studies
- Institute of Education
- Center for Teacher Education
- Center for General Education
- Center for Physical Education

=== International College ===
- Department of English Language and Literature
- Bachelor Program in Management of Service Industries
- Foreign Language Education Center
- Chinese Language Center
- Media Production and Education Center
- Department of Business Administration
- International Service Industry Management Bachelor's Degree Program
- Department of Information Technology and Management
- Department of Medical and Health Management

The university also runs the Affiliated Senior High School of Tzu Chi University, a daughter institution for secondary-school students in Taiwan.

=== Academic centers ===
- Medical Simulation Center
- Doping Control Center
- Animal Experimentation Center
- Continuing Education Center
- Tzuchi University Radio Station (FM 88.3 MHz)

== Campus facilities ==
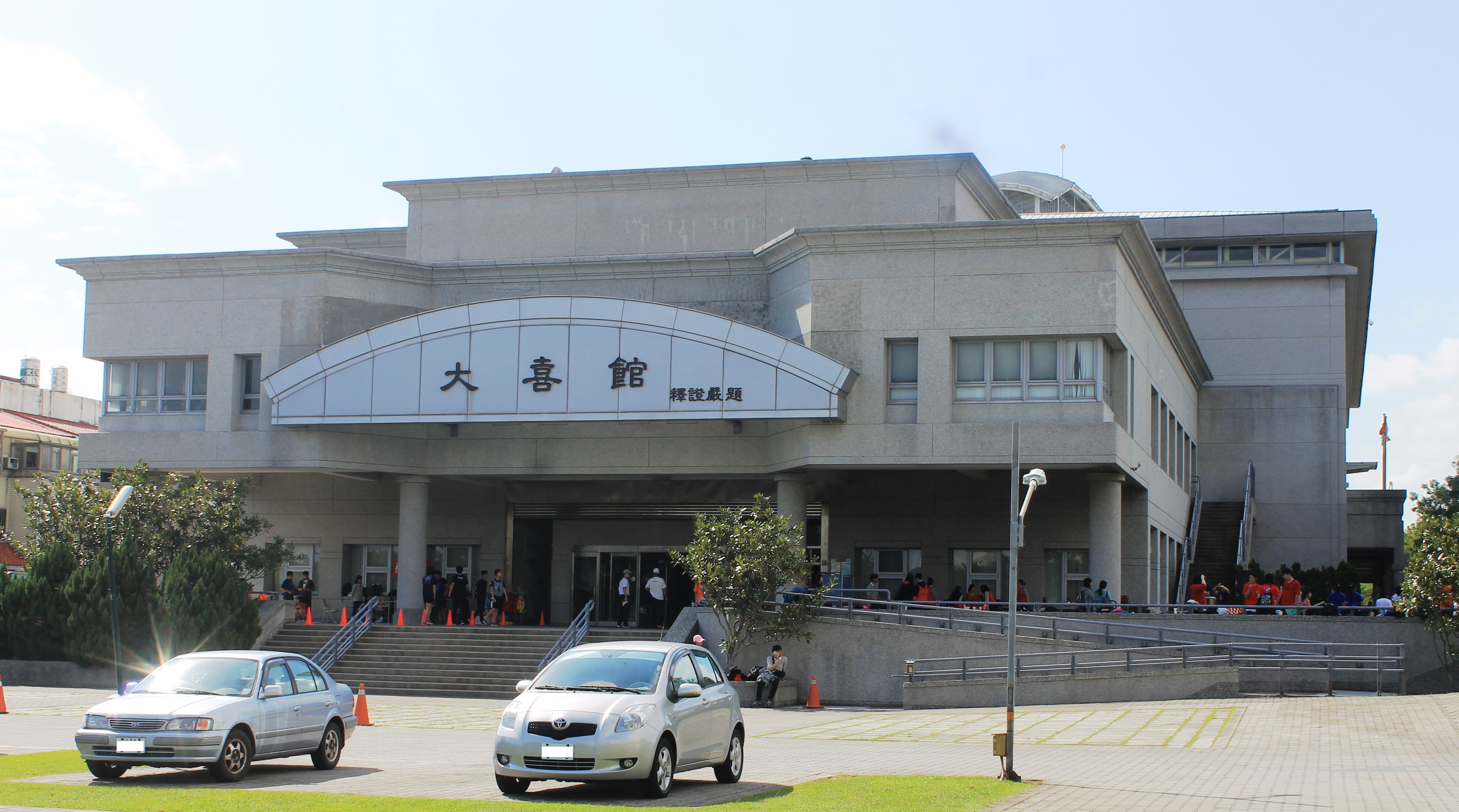
The sports complex

- Library: Around 350,000 volumes and Internet connection to other libraries in Taiwan.
- Information System Center: Computer training courses for students, staff, and faculty and a multimedia room.
- Gymnasium: Indoor facilities for badminton, basketball, table tennis, aerobics, and fitness, an indoor Olympic standard swimming pool, and outdoor basketball courts, tennis courts, volleyball courts, and a jogging track.
- On-campus dormitories: Four students share one room with a bathroom.
- Cafeteria: vegetable meals, NT$15 for breakfast, NT$25 for lunch and dinner.

=== Extracurricular activities ===
The university had 56 student clubs or societies in 2010.

=== Tradition ===
- 10 km Road Race: Before students graduated, every undergraduate had to run the race in 80 minutes biyearly. Starting from 2013, however, it is no longer required for students to participate.

== Presidents ==
- February 1993-May 2000, Lee Ming-liang (李明亮), MD-PhD: Minister of the Department of Health of the Republic of China, 2000-2002
- March 2001-July 2002, C.-F. Lan (藍忠孚), PhD.
- December 2002-November 2005, Jye – Siung Fang (方菊雄), PhD.
- March 2006-July 2019, Pen-Jung Wang (王本榮), MD-PhD.
- August 2019- , Ingrid Y. Liu (劉怡均), PhD.

== International academic exchanges ==
=== Sister schools ===
- United States
  - University of California, Berkeley
  - Cy-Fair College
  - Colorado College
  - Indiana University
  - California State Polytechnic University, Pomona
- Canada
  - University of British Columbia
  - First Nations University of Canada
- Australia
  - Griffith University
- China
  - Peking University
  - Shanghai Jiao Tong University
  - Central South University
  - Sun Yat-Sen University
- Hong Kong
  - University of Hong Kong
- Japan
  - Bukkyo University
  - Shukutoku University
  - Shokei Gakuin University
- Taiwan
  - National Chiao Tung University
  - National Chung Hsing University
  - National Taipei University of Technology
- (South Korea) Korea
  - Honam University
- Malaysia
  - University of Malaya
  - Universiti Sains Malaysia
  - Universiti Tunku Abdul Rahman
  - Malay College Kuala Kangsar
- Thailand
  - Mahidol University
  - Songkhla Rajabhat University
  - Chulalongkorn University
  - Khon Kaen University
  - Sripatum University
- Philippines
  - University of Santo Tomas
  - St. Luke's College of Medicine
  - Angeles University Foundation
- Sweden
  - Halmstad University
- Indonesia
  - University of Indonesia
- Nicaragua
  - Universidad de Ciencias Comerciales
- Vietnam
  - Ho Chi Minh City University of Foreign Languages and Information Technology
- Venezuela
  - Universidad Central de Venezuela

== Transportation ==
The university is within walking distance west from Hualien Station of Taiwan Railway.

== See also ==
- List of Chinese language schools in Taiwan
