= Erasmus Mundus =

European scholarship and student exchange program

The European Union's Erasmus Mundus programme (named after Erasmus, the Renaissance scholar) aims to enhance quality in higher education through scholarships and academic co-operation between the EU and the rest of the world. The three main objectives of the programme are linked to the internationalisation of students, staff, curricula and research; ensure an influence on the development of practice in Special Education Needs and inclusive education; and to develop international collaborative networks, projects and research.

Erasmus Mundus comprises three actions:

- Joint programmes
- Partnerships
- Attractiveness projects

== Erasmus Mundus Joint Programmes ==
Under Action 1, Erasmus Mundus supports Joint Programmes (Masters Courses) that are operated by consortia of higher education institutions from the EU and (since 2009) elsewhere in the world. They provide an integrated course and joint or multiple diplomas following study or research at two or more higher education institutions.

Erasmus Mundus funds a number of scholarships for students and academics studying or teaching on Erasmus Mundus Masters Courses. Since 2010, fellowships have also been available for doctoral candidates following one of the Joint doctorates.

Scholarships cover participation costs, subsistence costs, and insurance for the duration of the study period. Many students also have the right to a contribution to travel costs.

== Erasmus Mundus partnerships ==
Under Action 2, Erasmus Mundus Partnerships bring together higher education institutions from Europe and from a particular region in the world. Together, the partnerships manage mobility flows between the two regions for a range of academic levels—undergraduate, masters, doctorate, post-doctorate—and for academic staff.

Scholarships cover participation costs, subsistence costs, insurance for the duration of the study period, plus a contribution to travel costs.

A partnership usually has a legalistic dimension and is based on some formal agreement and close cooperation between two or more parties such as higher education institutions and may involve businesses, non-profit organisations or non-governmental organisations. Partners have specified rights and responsibilities. A collaboration, often described as an 'authentic partnership' exists where people identify their common interests and work jointly with others especially in an intellectual endeavour.

They often share their professional skills to support the community. An alliance usually referred to as a 'strategic alliance', is a close association of nations or other groups, formed to advance common interests or causes. These strategic partnerships seem to have blurred edges and though they are slightly different, they can all be used to describe some aspect of the Erasmus Mundus MA/Magistr in Special Education which was developed as a result of policy guidelines and funding from the European Commission.

== Erasmus Mundus Attractiveness Projects ==
Under Action 3, Erasmus Mundus funds projects to enhance the attractiveness and visibility of European higher education worldwide. Activities focus on the international dimension of higher education, often targeting a particular region or academic discipline.

Funding is available for:

- European joint masters and doctorates
- Partnerships with non-European higher education institutions and scholarships for students and academics
- Projects to promote European higher education worldwide

== See also ==
- Masters in Strategic Project Management (European)
- University Mobility in Asia and the Pacific

== Examples ==
=== Techniques, Heritage, Territories of Industry (TPTI) ===
The Master Erasmus Mundus Techniques, Heritage, Territories of Industry is a two year international graduate program coordinated by the Paris 1 Panthéon-Sorbonne University (France) and offering a joint degree with the University of Padua (Italy) and the University of Évora (Portugal).

=== European Master's in Clinical Linguistics (EMCL) ===
The European Master's in Clinical Linguistics (EMCL) is an Erasmus Mundus Joint Master Degree in the field of clinical linguistics, neurolinguistics and psycholinguistics. It is offered by the University of Eastern Finland (Finland), Ghent University (Belgium) and University of Groningen (The Netherlands), and collaborates with a further 23 associated partners.
