= National Chiayi University =

University in Southern Taiwan

- 國立嘉義大學
- Other name: NCYU
- Former names: National Chiayi Institute of Technology; National Chiayi Teachers College
- Motto: 誠樸、力行、創新、服務; Sêng-phok, Le̍k-hêng, Chhòng-sin, Ho̍k-bū
- Motto in English: Sincerity, Action, Innovation, Service
- Type: Public, national
- Established: February 2000
- Affiliations: National University System of Taiwan
- President: Han-Chien Lin
- Vice-president: Ruey-Shyang Chen; Chun-Hsien Chang; Hung-Wen Lee
- Location: Chiayi City, Taiwan; 23°27′49.26″N 120°29′0.98″E
- Campus: Urban
- Website: www.ncyu.edu.tw/ncyu_eng/

National Chiayi University
- Traditional Chinese: 國立嘉義大學
- Simplified Chinese: 国立嘉义大学
Transcriptions
Standard Mandarin
- Hanyu Pinyin: Guólì Jiāyì Dàxué
- Wade–Giles: Ko^{2}-li^{4} Chia^{1}-i^{4} Ta^{4}-hsüeh^{2}
Southern Min
- Hokkien POJ: Kok-li̍p Ka-gī Tāi-ha̍k

National Chiayi University (NCYU; Chinese: 國立嘉義大學; Pe̍h-ōe-jī: Kok-li̍p Ka-gī Tāi-ha̍k) is a public university located in Chiayi City and Chiayi County, Taiwan. It was formed in 2000 by merging National Chiayi Institute of Technology and National Chiayi Teachers College. The University has six colleges, which include seven doctoral programs, 42 full-time master's degree programs, twelve part-time master's degree programs, and 38 undergraduate programs now. NCYU is one of the oldest and largest universities in southern Taiwan.

== History ==
The history of the university can be traced back to the merger between the National Chiayi Institute of Technology and National Chiayi Teachers College, with the National Chiayi Institute of Technology originally founded in the Japanese era.

The Kagi Agriculture and Forestry Public School (Kano) was established in April 1919 under Japanese rule and reorganized and renamed Taiwan Provincial Chiayi Agri-Vocational School in November 1945. The school was then upgraded to become Taiwan Provincial Chiayi Junior College of Agriculture in March 1965. In July 1981, it became a national college and funded by the Ministry of Education. In July 1997, it was upgraded again to become National Chiayi Institute of Technology.

The Taiwan Provincial Chiayi Normal School was founded in 1957. In August 1996, the school was upgraded to a five-year junior college and renamed Taiwan Provincial Chiayi Junior Teachers College. In July 1987, the college was reformed into a four-year college and renamed Taiwan Provincial Chiayi Teachers College. In July 1987, the college was upgraded into a national college and renamed National Chiayi Teachers College.

In February 2000, National Chiayi Institute of Technology and National Chiayi Teachers College were merged and became National Chiayi University.

== Campuses ==
NCYU comprises four campuses:

=== Lantan Main Campus ===
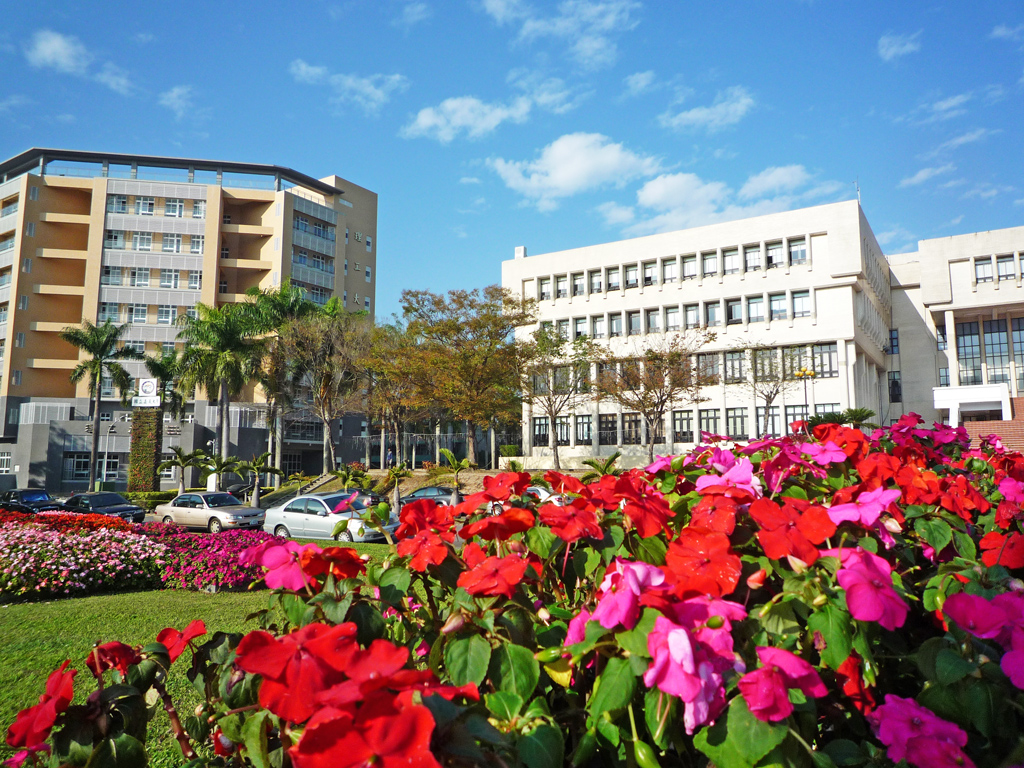
Lantan Campus

The campus is the administrative headquarters and located in the well-known scenic area between Lantan Reservoir and Renyitan Reservoir. It also accommodates the College of Agriculture, College of Science and Engineering and College of Life Sciences.

- Address: 300 Syuefu Road, East District, Chiayi City

=== Minxiong Campus ===
This campus accommodates the Teachers College and College of Humanities and Arts.

- Address: 85 Wunlong Village, Minxiong Township, Chiayi County

=== Linsen Campus ===
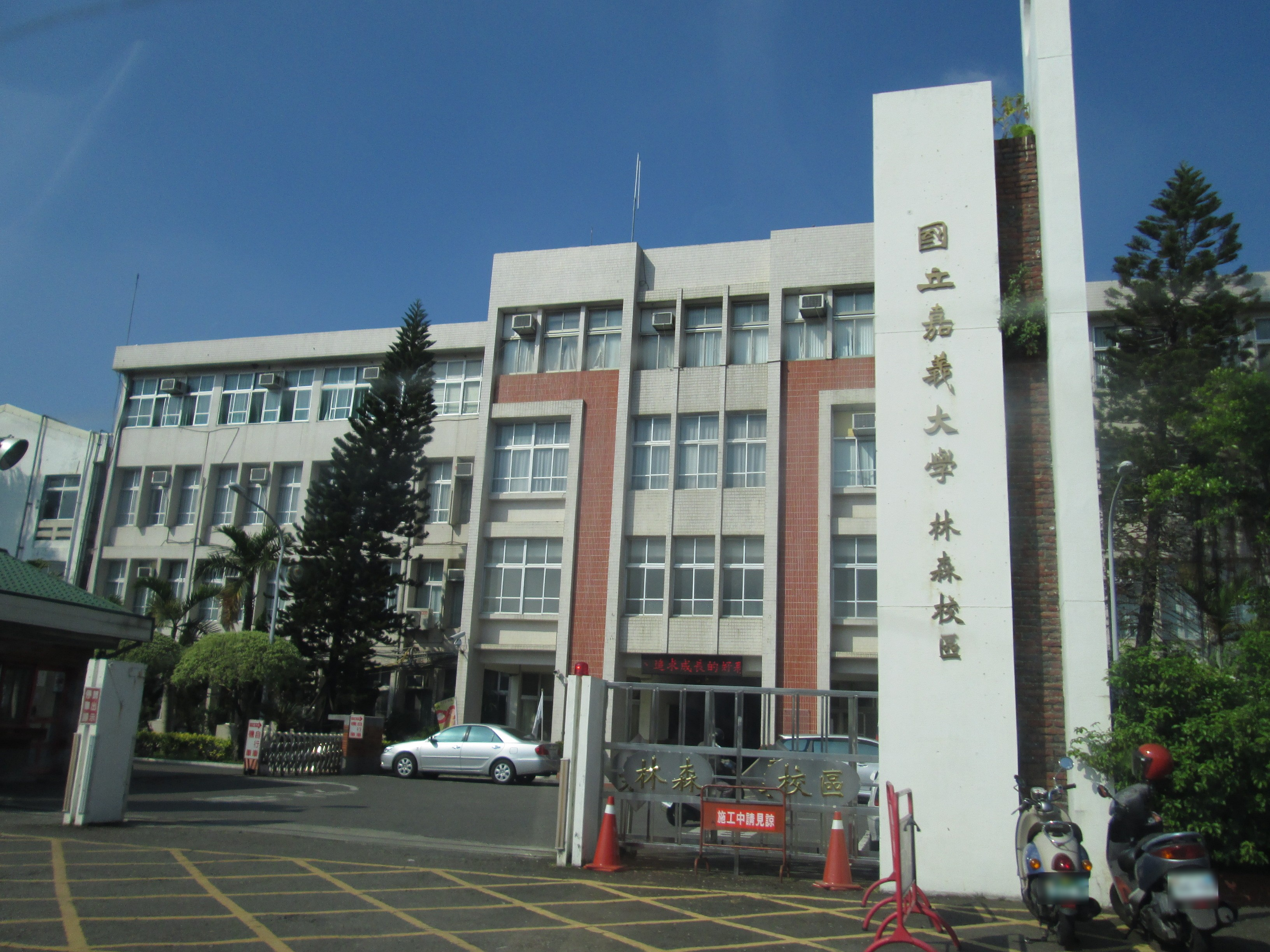
Lisen Campus

Extension and lifelong learning programs are offered in the campus to provide educational service to the local community.

- Address: 151 Linsen East Road, East District, Chiayi City

=== Sinmin Campus ===
Sinmin Campus is situated in West District in downtown Chiayi. Sinmin accommodates College of Management and College of Veterinary medicine.

- Address: 580 Sinmin Road, West District, Chiayi City

== Academics ==
=== Ranking ===
National Chiayi University rankings

Global – Overall
- CWUR World: 1970 (2023)
- THE World: 1501–2673 (2024)

Regional – Overall
- THE Asia: 601+ (2024)

National – Overall
- CWUR National: 32 (2023)
- THE National: 35–45 (2024)

NCYU consists of seven colleges (Agriculture, Humanities and Arts, Life Sciences, Management, Science and Engineering, Teachers, and Veterinary Medicine), 36 departments and 11 independent institutes, with 500 full-time faculty professors.

== Notable alumni ==
- Chen Ming-wen, Magistrate of Chiayi County (2001-2009)
- Huang Min-hui, acting Chairperson of Kuomintang

== See also ==
- List of universities in Taiwan
