= Fooyin University =

Private university in Daliao, Kaohsiung, Taiwan

- 輔英科技大學
- Type: private university
- Established: 1958 (as Fooyin Vocational High School of Midwifery); 1997 (as Fooyin Institute of Technology); 1 August 2002 (as FYU)
- Location: Daliao, Kaohsiung, Taiwan; 22.6042°N 120.3900°E
- Website: Official website

Fooyin University
- Traditional Chinese: 輔英科技大學
- Simplified Chinese: 辅英科技大学
Transcriptions
Standard Mandarin
- Hanyu Pinyin: Fǔyīng Kējì Dàxué
Southern Min
- Hokkien POJ: Hú-eng Kho-ki Tāi-ha̍k

The Fooyin University (FYU; Chinese: 輔英科技大學; Pe̍h-ōe-jī: Hú-eng Kho-ki Tāi-ha̍k) is a private university in Daliao District, Kaohsiung, Taiwan.

Fooyin University offers programs at the undergraduate, graduate, and doctoral levels in a variety of fields, including nursing, healthcare management, food science, biotechnology, engineering, and humanities.

The university also has a strong focus on research, with a number of research centers and institutes dedicated to topics such as biotechnology, healthcare, and traditional Chinese medicine.

== History ==
FYU was originally established as three-year Fooyin Vocational High School of Midwifery in 1958. In 1962, it was transformed into a four-year vocational high school. In 1968, the school was approved to be a five-year Fooyin Junior College. In February 1997, it became the Fooyin Institute of Technology. The school was officially upgraded to Fooyin University on 1 August 2002.

== Faculties ==
- College of Environment and Life Sciences
- College of Humanities and Management
- College of Medical and Health Sciences
- College of Nursing

== Transportation ==
The university is accessible within walking distance South from Daliao Station of the Kaohsiung MRT. However this will take about 30 mins. There is also the 20C bus which leaves from Exit 2 of Daliao Station and which stops outside the university and outside the university library.

== See also ==
- List of universities in Taiwan
