= National Chin-Yi University of Technology =

Public university in Taiping, Taichung, Taiwan

Coordinates: 24.1441°N 120.7289°E

- 國立勤益科技大學
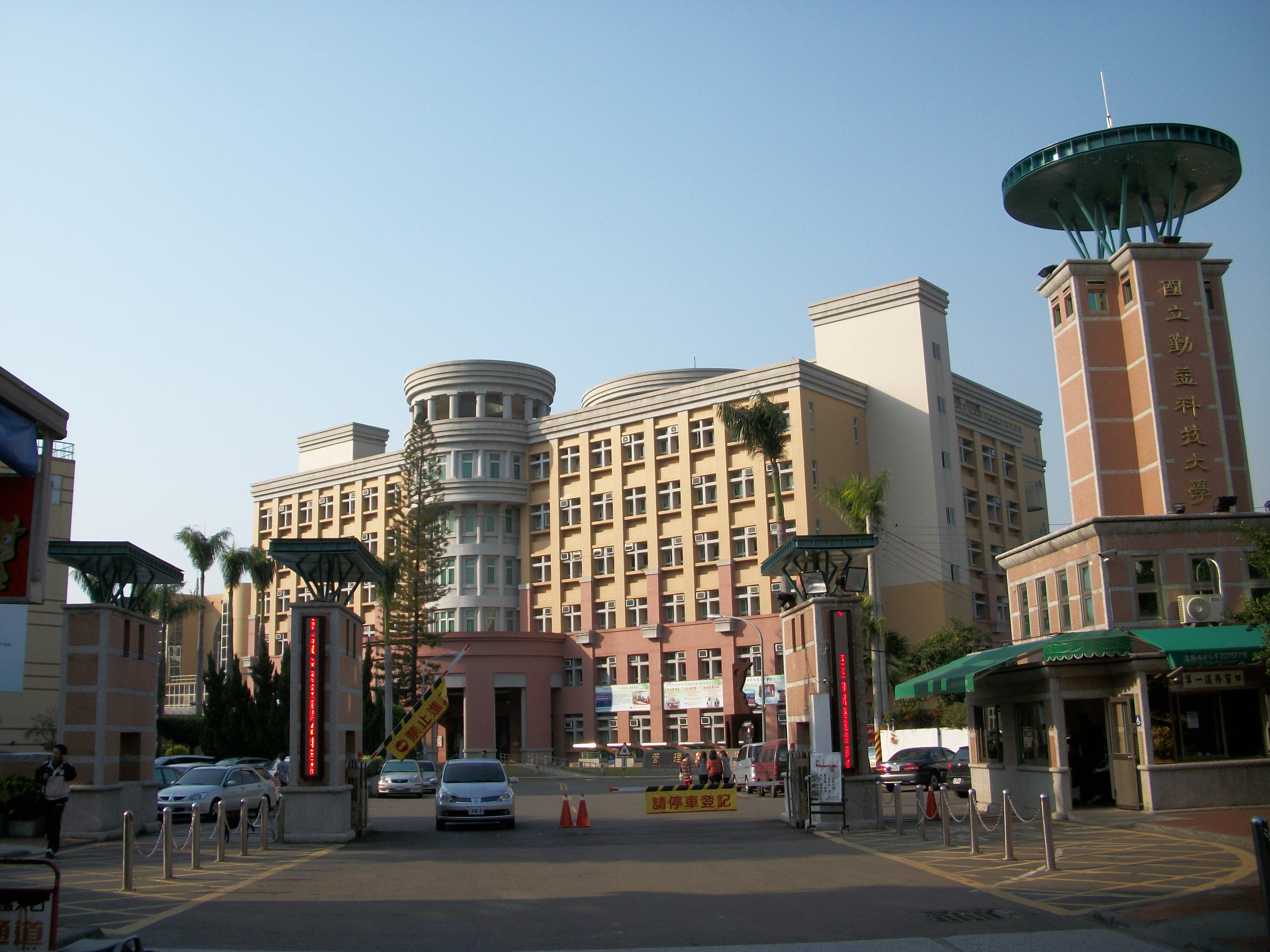
- Type: Public
- Established: 1971 (as Chin-Yi Technical Vocational Junior College); 1 February 2007 (as NCUT)
- Location: Taiping, Taichung, Taiwan
- Website: Official website

National Chin-Yi University of Technology
- Traditional Chinese: 國立勤益科技大學
Transcriptions
Standard Mandarin
- Hanyu Pinyin: Guólì Qínyì Kējì Dàxué
Southern Min
- Hokkien POJ: Kok-li̍p Khîn-ek Kho-ki Tāi-ha̍k

National Chin-Yi University of Technology (NCUT; Chinese: 國立勤益科技大學; Pe̍h-ōe-jī: Kok-li̍p Khîn-ek Kho-ki Tāi-ha̍k) is a public university located in Taiping District, Taichung, Taiwan.

Some of the most popular programs at NCYU include Mechanical Engineering, Electrical Engineering, Information Management, Environmental Engineering, and Finance. The university also offers programs in fields such as Applied English, Digital Media Design, and Industrial Design.

== History ==
NCUT was initially established as Chin-Yi Technical Vocational Junior College in 1971 as a private school. In 1973, it was renamed Chin-Yi Institute of Technology. In 1992, the school was nationalized. On 1 July 1999, it was designated as National Chin-Yi Institute of Technology. On 1 February 2007, it was officially designated as the National Chin-Yi University of Technology.

== Faculties ==
NCUT comprises five colleges: Electrical Engineering and Computer Science, Engineering, General Education, Humanities and Creativity, and Management.

== See also ==
- List of universities in Taiwan
