= Eduniversal =

University ranking

- Formation: 1994
- Type: Educational ranking organization
- Headquarters: Paris, France

Eduniversal is a France-based organization that publishes rankings and ratings of business schools. Founded in 1994 and headquartered in Paris, it compiles an annual selection of 1,000 business schools across more than 150 countries. The ranking classifies institutions across nine geographic regions spanning five continents.

According to the organization, institutions are evaluated in part through surveys of academic deans and are assigned ratings intended to reflect their international scope.

Eduniversal maintains an International Scientific Committee composed of regional representatives and organizational officers. The committee includes members representing Africa, Central Asia, Eastern Europe, Eurasia and the Middle East, Far East Asia, Latin America, North America, Oceania, and Western Europe, as well as the organization's Chief Executive Officer and International Coordinator.
