= National Chung Hsing University =

University in Taichung, Taiwan

- 國立中興大學 (Chinese)
- Former names: Advanced Academy of Agronomy and Forestry (1919–28); Taichung College of Agronomy and Forestry (1943–45); Taiwan Provincial College of Agriculture (1946–61); Taiwan Provincial Chung Hsing University (1961–71)
- Motto: 誠樸精勤
- Motto in English: Honesty, Simplicity, Advancement, Diligence
- Type: National public research university
- Established: 1919
- Affiliations: EUTW; Taiwan Comprehensive University System; EPU
- Endowment: US$163 million (2023) (NTD$5.19 billion)
- President: Fuh-Jyh Jan
- Faculty: 845
- Administrative staff: 416
- Undergraduates: 10,240
- Postgraduates: 5,552
- Location: South District, Taichung, Taiwan; 24°07′26.7″N 120°40′30.2″E
- Campus: Urban, 0.872 km² Experimental forest, 83.25 km²
- Website: www.nchu.edu.tw

Chinese name
- Traditional Chinese: 國立中興大學
- Simplified Chinese: 国立中兴大学
- Literal meaning: University for Chinese National Revival
Transcriptions
Standard Mandarin
- Hanyu Pinyin: Guólì Zhōngxìng Dàxué
Southern Min
- Hokkien POJ: Kok-li̍p Tiong-hèng Tāi-ha̍k

National Chung Hsing University (NCHU; Chinese: 國立中興大學; pinyin: Guólì Zhōngxìng Dàxué) is a national public research university in Taichung, Taiwan. It is one of the four universities of the Taiwan Comprehensive University System, a university alliance in Taiwan.

== History ==
In 1919, the university was established in Taipei under the orders of the Governor-General of Taiwan during the Japanese colonial era. On May 9, 1919, it was founded with Japanese academic Fumio Abe appointed as its principal. It began as the "Advanced Academy of Agronomy and Forestry". The academy consisted of a preparatory school and an undergraduate college, with the latter including agriculture and forestry departments. At the time, the school was located in what is now Zhongshan Hall.

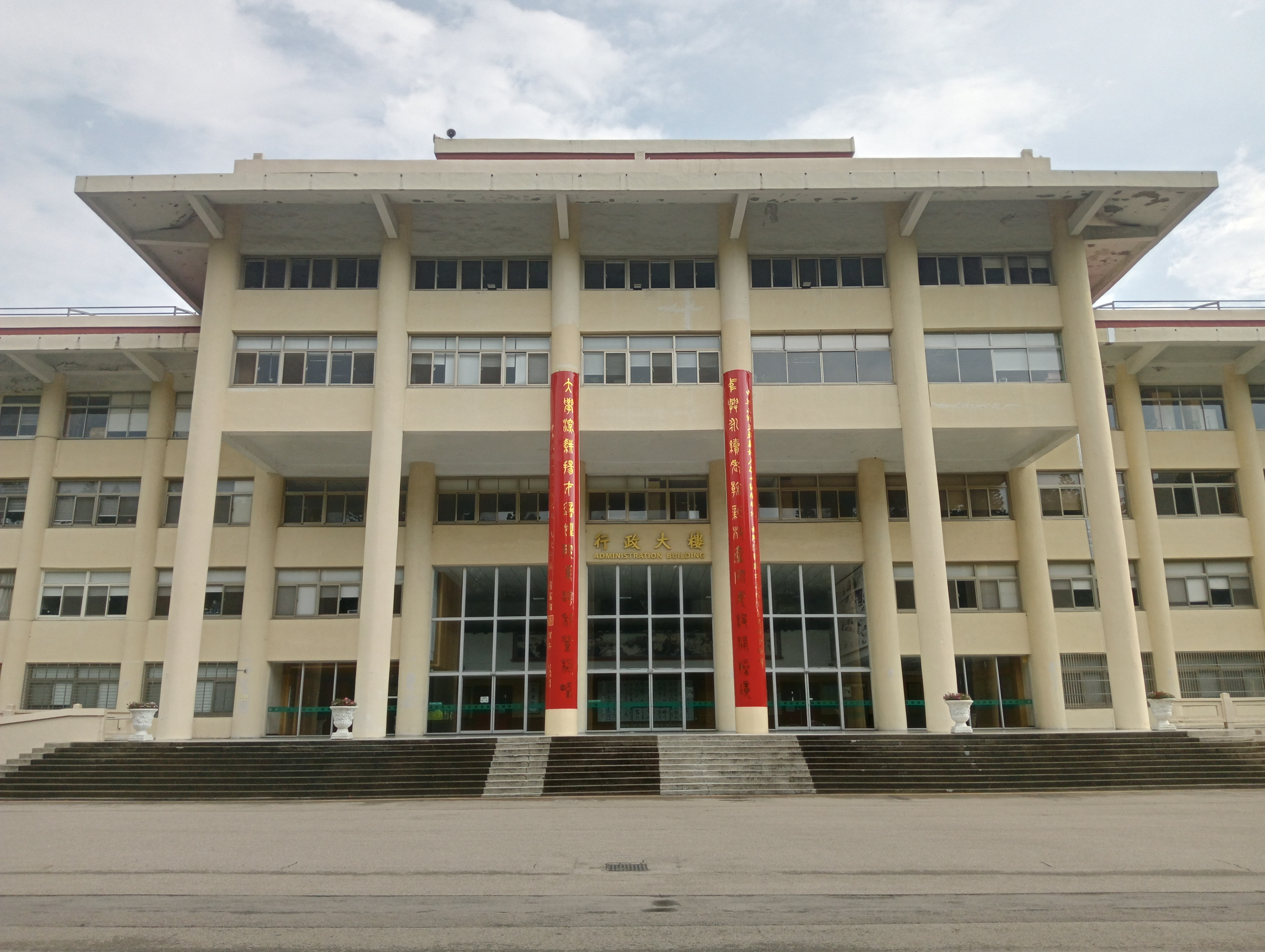
Administration Building

On March 31, 1928, the academy was merged into the Department of Agriculture and Forestry at Taihoku Imperial University. In 1943, it separated from the university and was reorganized into an independent higher school which held classes at its original campus in Taipei. On October 1, 1943, the school was moved to Taichung City. After the end of World War II and the Retrocession of Taiwan in 1945, it was reorganized as the Taiwan Provincial Taichung Agricultural Junior College and consisted of three departments: Agronomy, Forestry, and Agricultural Chemistry.

On September 1, 1946, the school became the Taiwan Provincial College of Agriculture. On July 1, 1961, the college merged with the Taichung College of Science and Engineering and the Taipei College of Law and Business to form Taiwan Provincial Chung Hsing University, with a campus in Taichung and a campus in Taipei. It established an evening school on its Taipei campus in 1964 and a College of Liberal Arts was added to the Taichung campus in 1968. In 1971, it became a national university and assumed its current name.

== Campus ==
The Taichung Campus contains the College of Liberal Arts, the College of Agriculture and Natural Resources, the College of Science, the College of Engineering, the College of Life Sciences, the College of Veterinary Medicine, the College of Social Sciences and Management, and the Extension Division for Inservice and Continuing Education. It is located in the south of Taichung City with an area of approximately 53 hectares. The university owns four experimental forests located in New Taipei City, Nantou County, Taichung City, and Tainan City, respectively. It also owns two experimental farms located at Wufeng and Wuri Districts in Taichung City.

== Organization ==
NCHU has ten colleges: Agriculture and Natural Resources, Electrical Engineering and Computer Science, Engineering, Medicine, Law and Politics, Liberal Arts, Life Sciences, Management, Science, and Veterinary Medicine.

== International programs ==
NCHU participates in the Taiwan International Graduate Program in Molecular and Biological Agricultural Sciences of Academia Sinica, Taiwan's most preeminent academic research institution.

Sister relationships with the University of Tasmania, Deakin University, University of New South Wales in Australia.

== Official Journal ==
- Chung-Hsing Historiography

University rankings

Global – Overall
- ARWU World: 801-900 (2022)
- QS World: =628 (2026)
- THE World: 1201–1500 (2023)

Regional – Overall
- QS Asia: 116 (2023)
- THE Asia: 401–500 (2023)

National – Overall
- ARWU National: 11-14 (2022)
- QS National: 13 (2023)
- THE National: 18+ (2023)

== Notable alumni ==
- Chen Chih-ching, Minister of Council of Agriculture (2016)
- Chen Ter-shing, Vice Minister of Science and Technology (2014–2017)
- Cho Jung-tai, Chairperson of Democratic Progressive Party
- Ding Kung-wha, Chairperson of Financial Supervisory Commission (2016)
- Hochen Tan, Minister of Transportation and Communications (2016–2018)
- Ho Min-hao, member of Legislative Yuan (2002–2008)
- Hsieh Ming-yuan, member of Legislative Yuan (2002–2008)
- Kao Fu-yao, Deputy Minister of Public Construction Commission
- Lee Chin-yung, Magistrate of Yunlin County (2014–2018)
- Lee Li-chen, Deputy Minister of Mainland Affairs Council
- Lee Shying-jow, Minister of Veterans Affairs Council (2016–2018)
- Peng Tso-kwei, Minister of Council of Agriculture (1997–1999)
- Su Chun-jung, Deputy Minister of Directorate-General of Personnel Administration
- Su Jain-rong, Minister of Finance
- Sung Yu-hsieh, Deputy Secretary-General of Executive Yuan
- Tsai Chi-chang, Vice President of Legislative Yuan
- Tsai Jeong-duen, Vice President of Judicial Yuan
- Uliw Qaljupayare, member of Legislative Yuan (2008–2017)
- Wang Chung-yi, Minister of Coast Guard Administration (2014–2016)
- Yuma Taru, Atayal weaver and dyer, Living National Treasure

== See also ==
- Taiwan Comprehensive University System
- EUTW university alliance
- List of universities in Taiwan
