= List of universities and colleges in Taiwan =

The following is a list of universities, colleges, junior colleges, and institutes of technology in Taiwan.

== Public universities and colleges ==
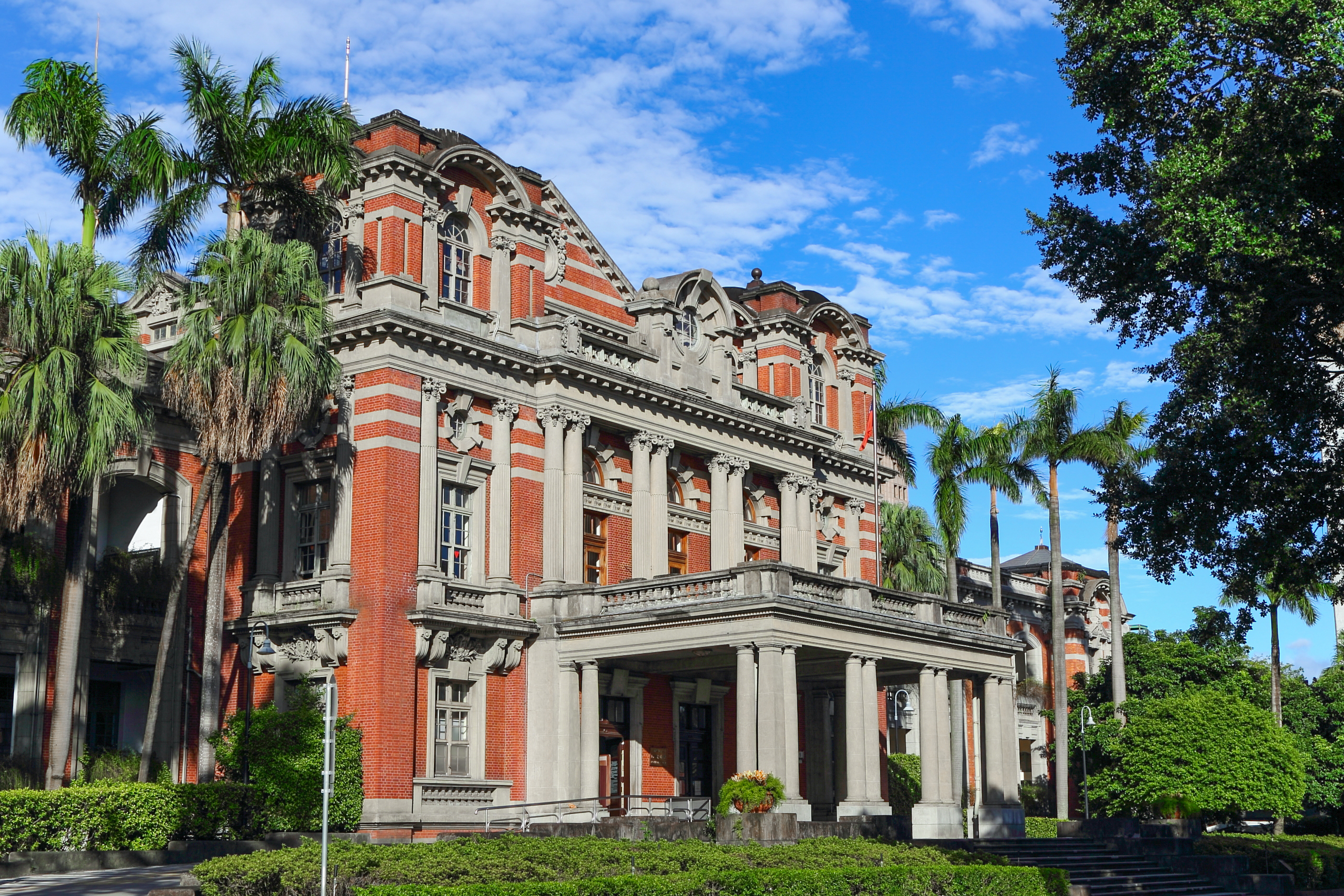
National Taiwan University

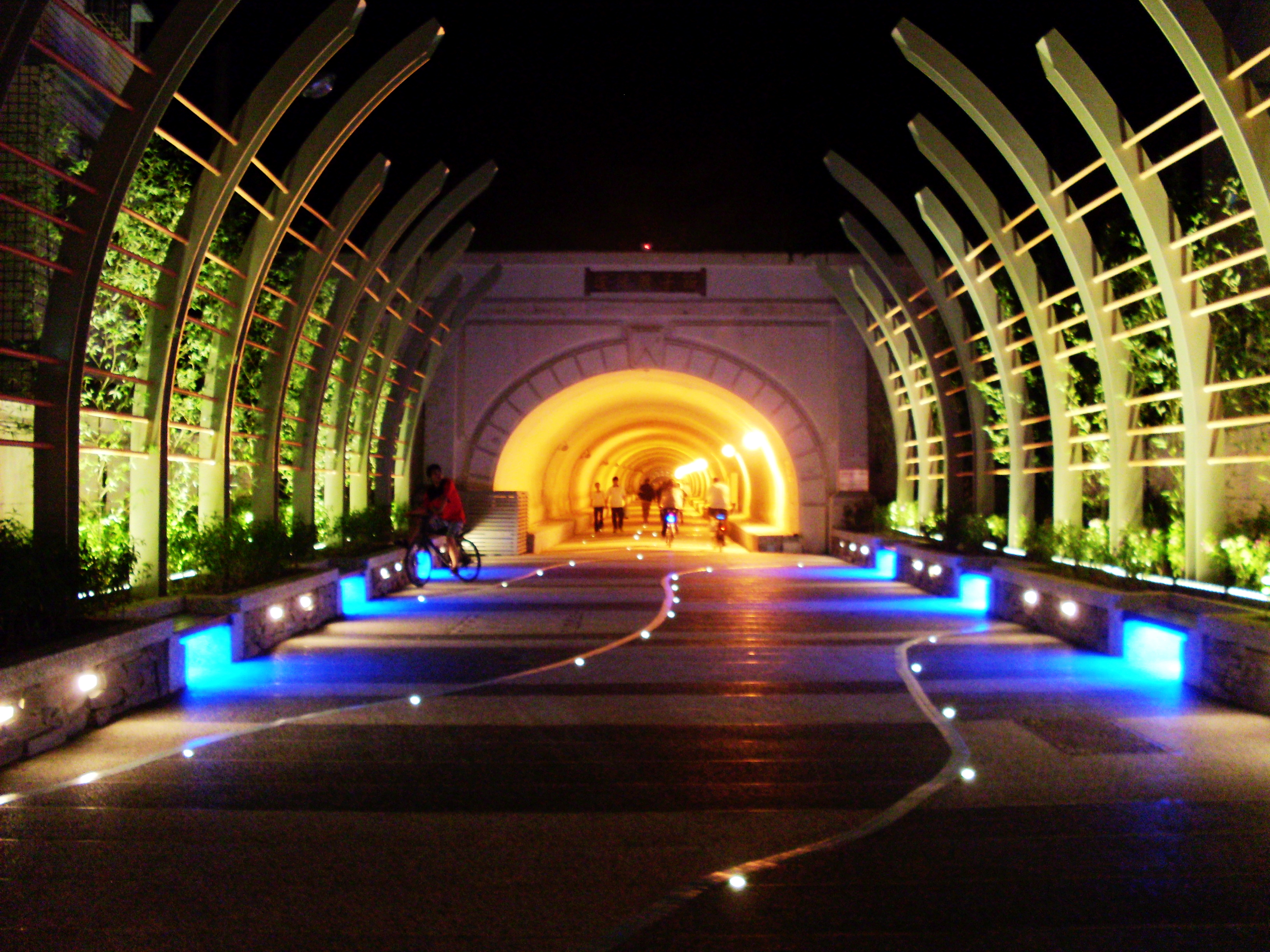
National Sun Yat-sen University

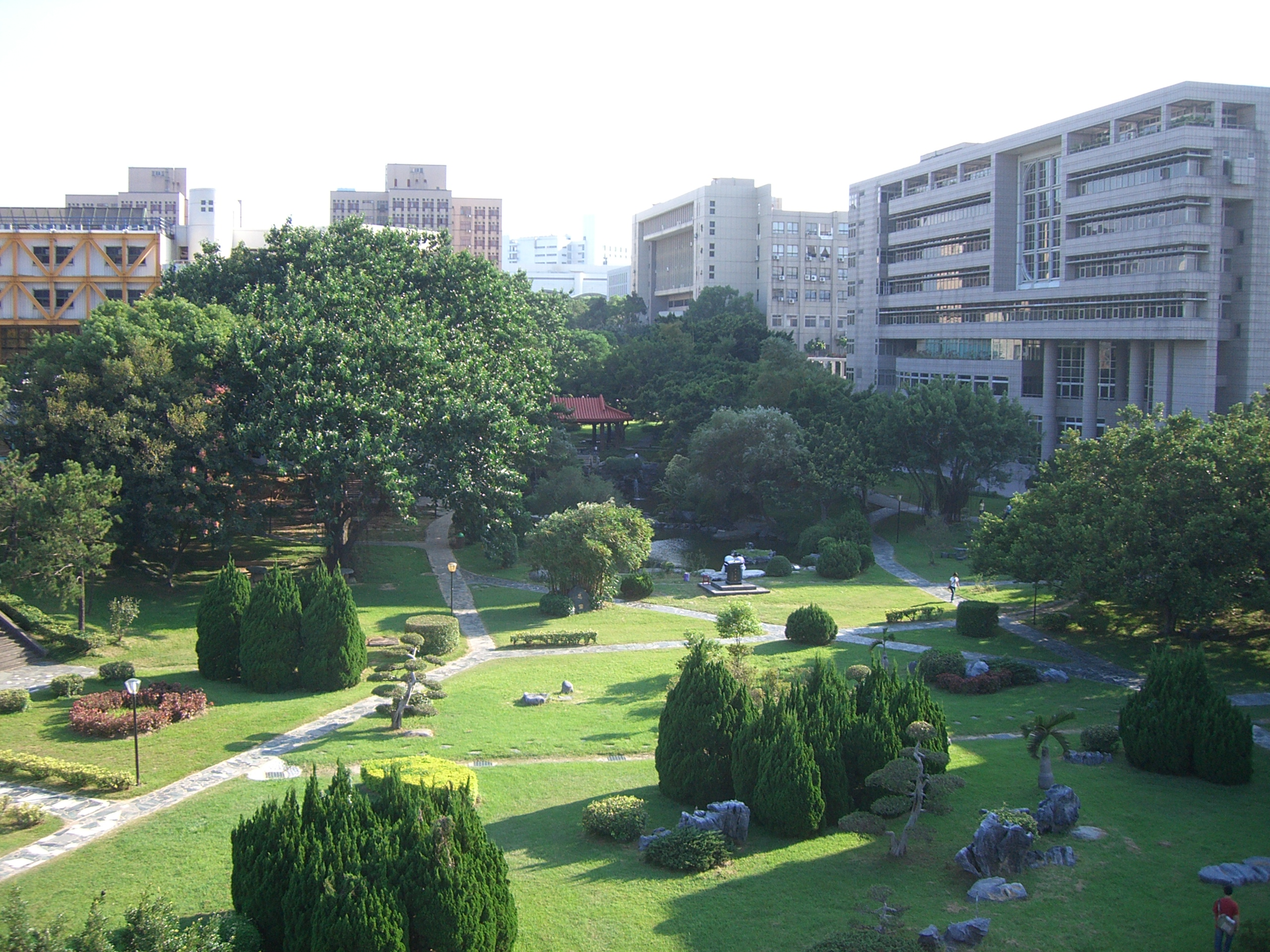
National Yang Ming Chiao Tung University

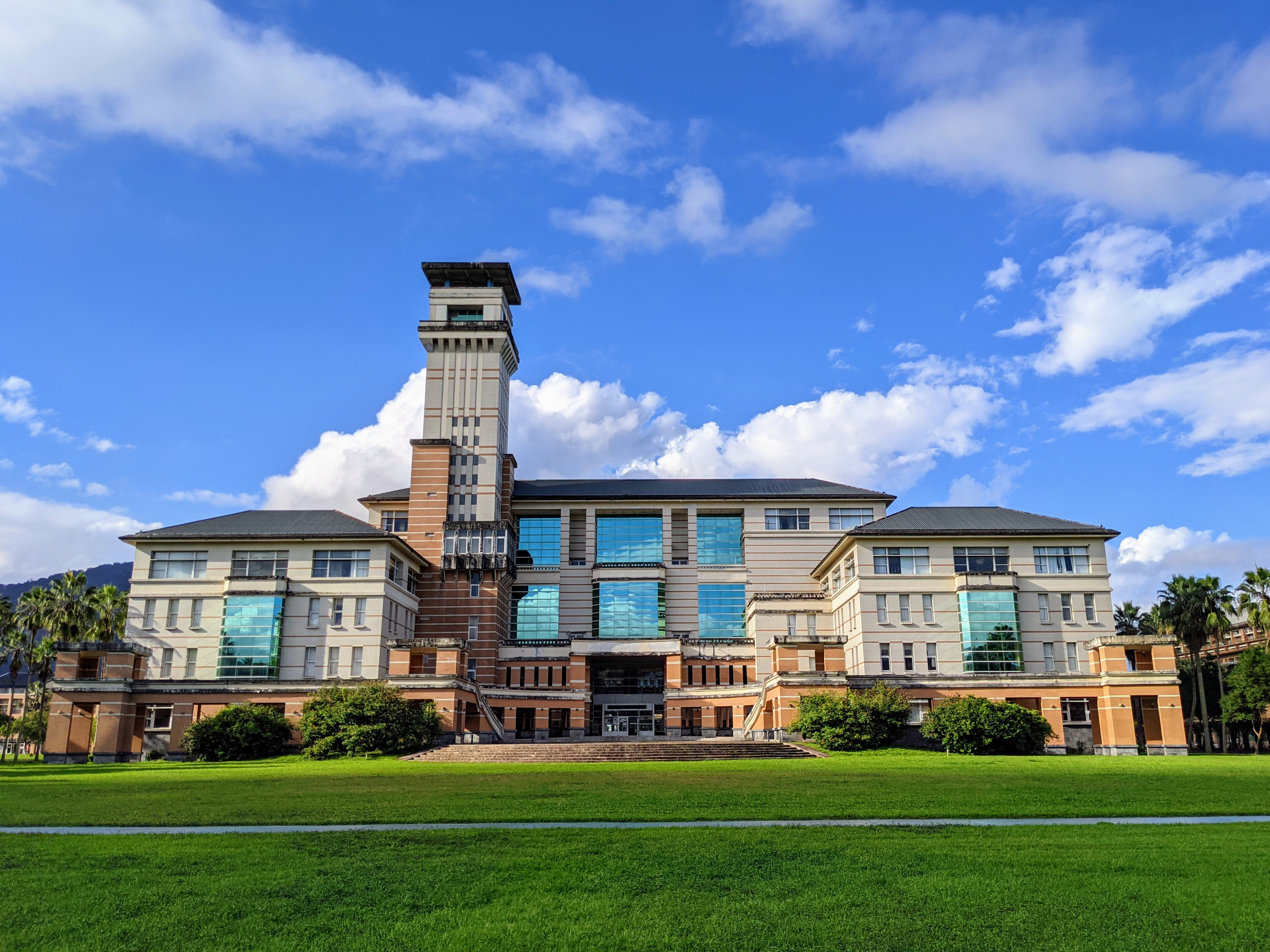
National Dong Hwa University

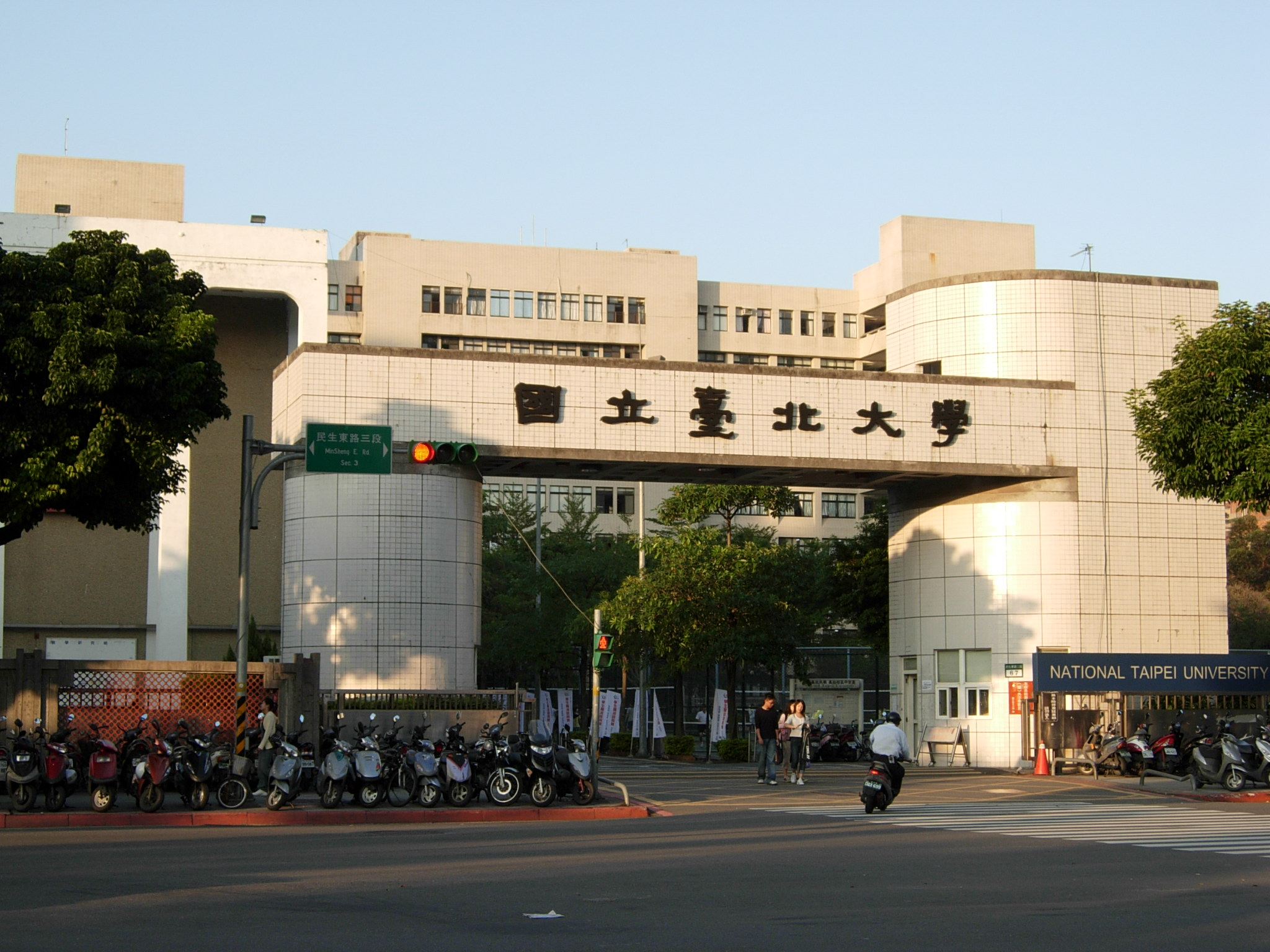
National Taipei University

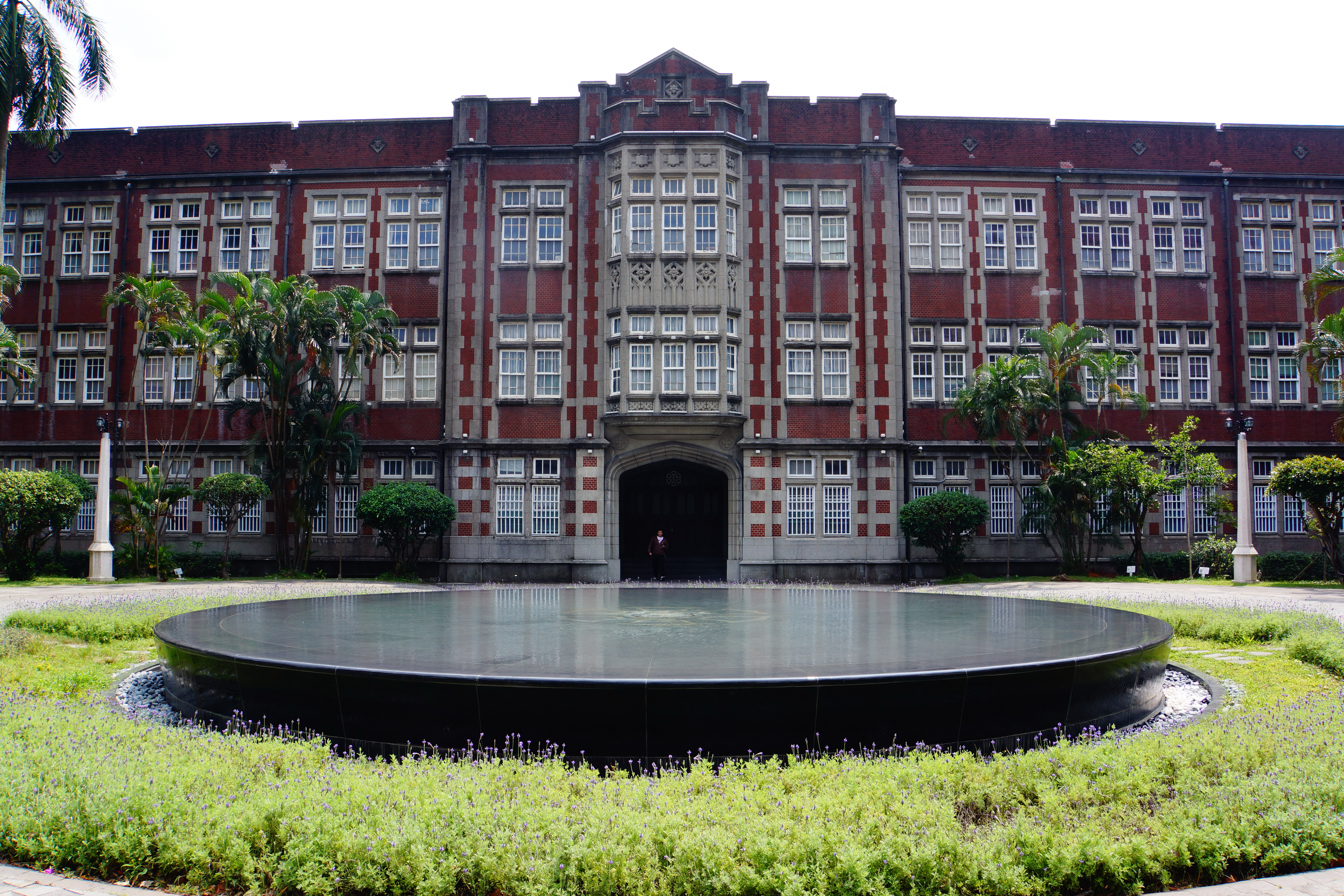
National Taiwan Normal University

=== Research ===
Name	Abbr.	Chinese name	Location
National Central University	NCU	國立中央大學	Zhongli District, Taoyuan City
National Cheng Kung University	NCKU	國立成功大學	East District, Tainan
National Sun Yat-sen University	NSYSU	國立中山大學	Gushan District, Kaohsiung; Renwu District, Kaohsiung Lingya District, Kaohsiung
National Taiwan University	NTU	國立臺灣大學	Daan District, Taipei
National Tsing Hua University	NTHU	國立清華大學	East District, Hsinchu
National Yang Ming Chiao Tung University	NYCU	國立陽明交通大學	East District, Hsinchu Beitou District, Taipei
=== General ===
Name	Abbr.	Chinese name	Location
National Chengchi University	NCCU	國立政治大學	Wenshan District, Taipei
National Chi Nan University	NCNU	國立暨南國際大學	Puli Township, Nantou County
National Chiayi University	NCYU	國立嘉義大學	Chiayi City, Chiayi County; Minxiong Township, Chiayi County
National Chung Cheng University	CCU	國立中正大學	Minxiong Township, Chiayi County
National Chung Hsing University	NCHU	國立中興大學	South District, Taichung
National Dong Hwa University	NDHU	國立東華大學	Shoufeng Township, Hualien County
National Ilan University	NIU	國立宜蘭大學	Yilan City, Yilan County
National Quemoy University	NQU	國立金門大學	Jinning Township, Kinmen County
National Pingtung University	NPTU	國立屏東大學	Pingtung City, Pingtung County; Checheng Township, Pingtung County
National Taipei University	NTPU	國立臺北大學	Sanxia District, New Taipei; Zhongshan District, Taipei
National Taitung University	NTTU	國立臺東大學	Taitung City, Taitung County
National Taiwan Ocean University	NTOU	國立臺灣海洋大學	Zhongzheng District, Keelung; Beigan Township, Lienchiang County
National United University	NUU	國立聯合大學	Miaoli City, Miaoli County
National University of Tainan	NUTN	國立臺南大學	West Central District, Tainan
National University of Kaohsiung	NUK	國立高雄大學	Nanzih District, Kaohsiung
University of Taipei	UT	臺北市立大學	Zhongzheng District, Taipei; Songshan District, Taipei
=== Universities of education ===
Name	Abbr.	Chinese name	Location
National Changhua University of Education	NCUE	國立彰化師範大學	Changhua City, Changhua County
National Kaohsiung Normal University	NKNU	國立高雄師範大學	Lingya District, Kaohsiung; Yanchao District, Kaohsiung
National Taichung University of Education	NTCU	國立臺中教育大學	West District, Taichung
National Taipei University of Education	NTUE	國立臺北教育大學	Daan District, Taipei
National Taiwan Normal University	NTNU	國立臺灣師範大學	Daan District, Taipei; Wenshan District, Taipei; Linkou District, New Taipei Luzhou District, New Taipei
=== Universities of arts and sports ===
Name	Abbr.	Chinese name	Location
National Taiwan Sport University	NTSU	國立體育大學	Guishan District, Taoyuan City
National Taiwan University of Arts	NTUA	國立臺灣藝術大學	Banqiao District, New Taipei
National Taiwan University of Physical Education and Sport	NTUPES	國立臺灣體育運動大學	North District, Taichung
Tainan National University of the Arts	TNNUA	國立臺南藝術大學	Guantian District, Tainan
Taipei National University of the Arts	TNUA	國立臺北藝術大學	Beitou District, Taipei
=== Open universities ===
Name	Abbr.	Chinese name	Location
National Open University	NOU	國立空中大學	Luzhou District, New Taipei
Open University of Kaohsiung	OUK	高雄市立空中大學	Siaogang District, Kaohsiung

== Private universities and colleges ==
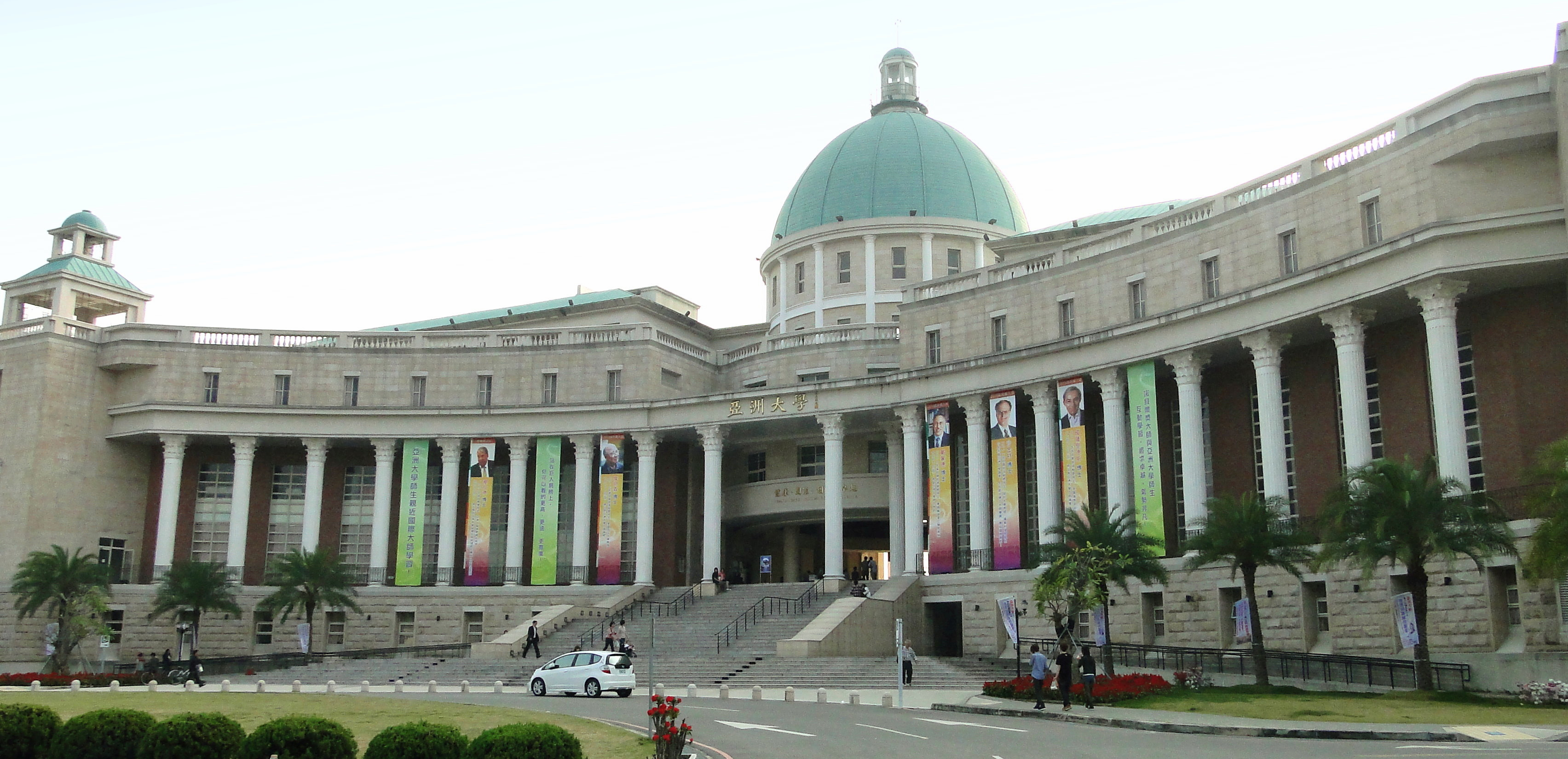
Asia University

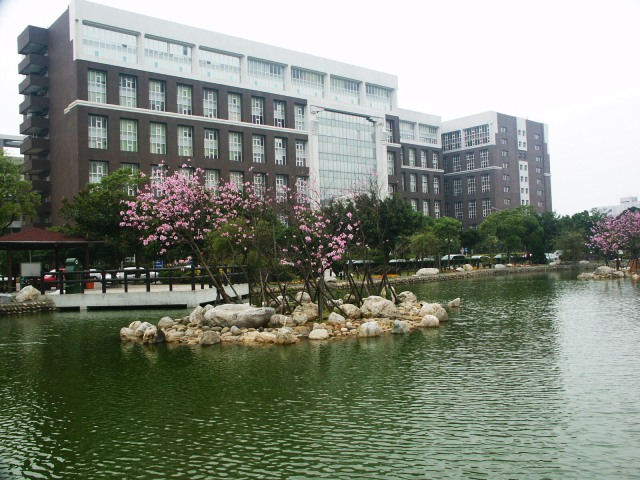
Chang Gung University

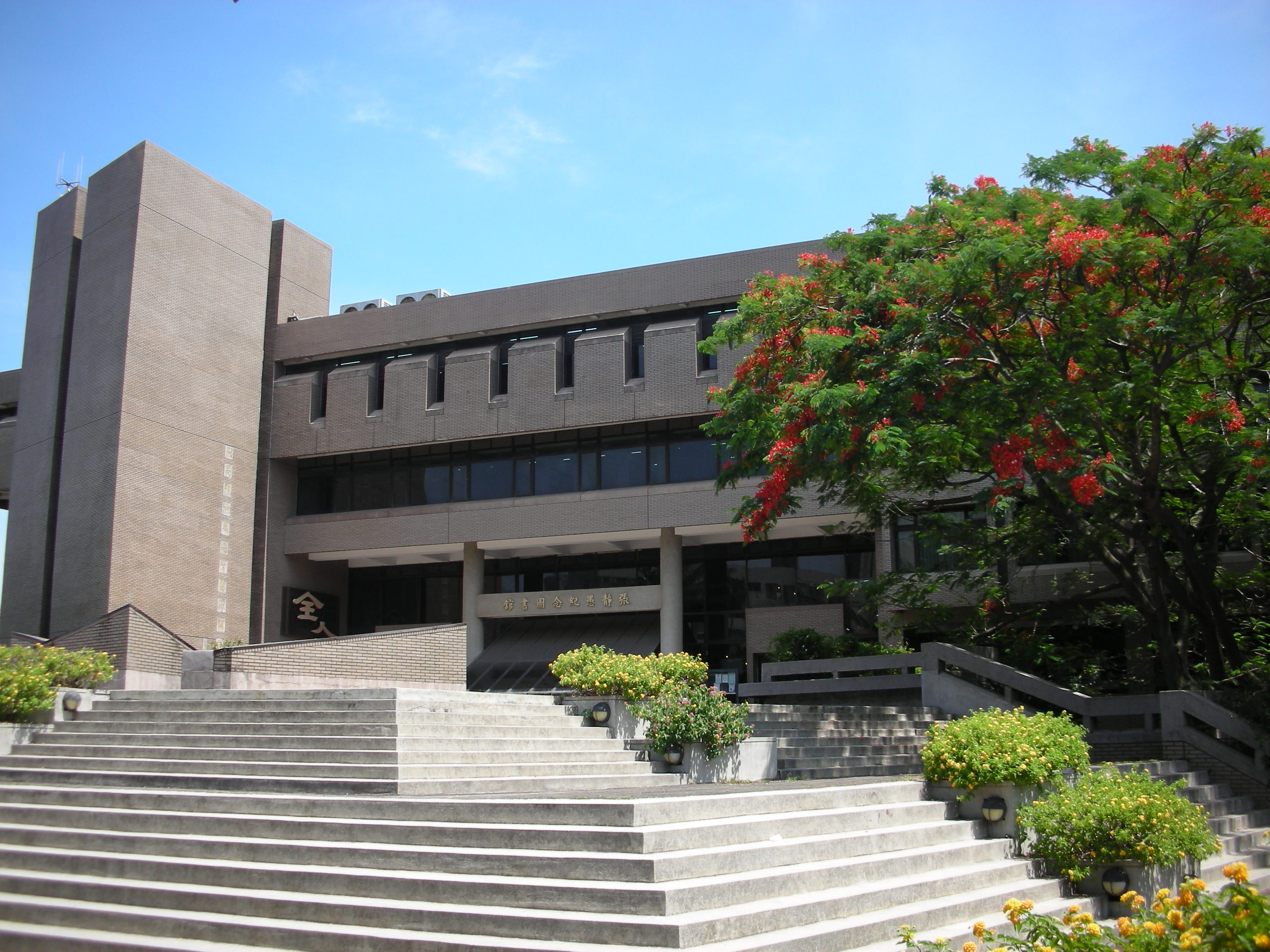
Chung Yuan Christian University

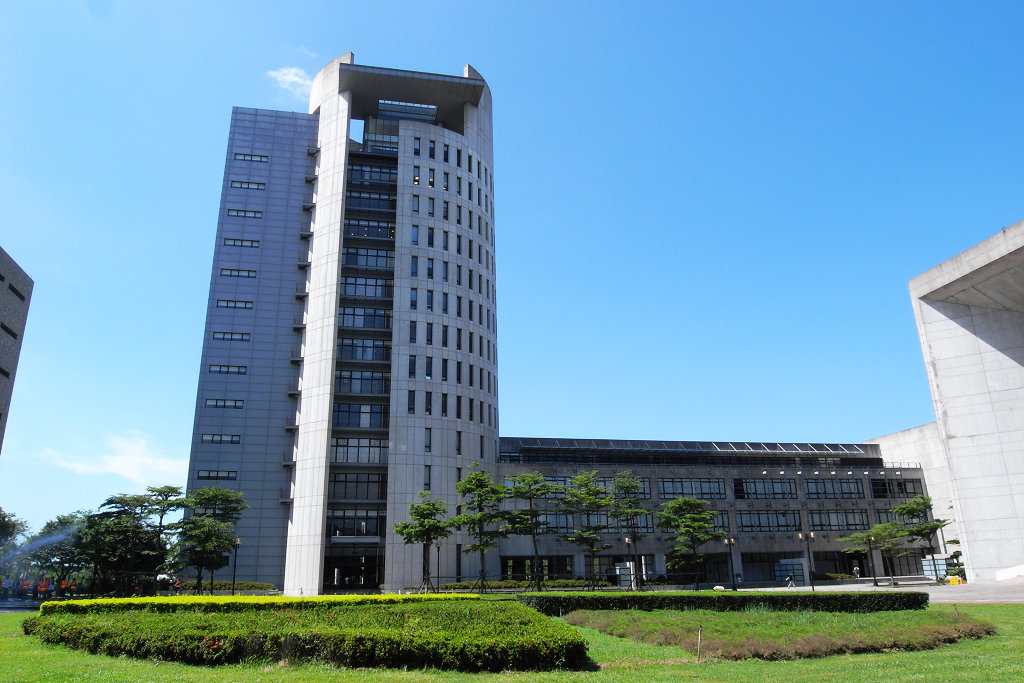
Yuan Ze University

Name	Abbr.	Chinese name	Location
Aletheia University	AU	真理大學	Tamsui District, New Taipei; Madou District, Tainan
Asia University	ASIA	亞洲大學	Wufeng District, Taichung
Chang Gung University	CGU	長庚大學	Guishan District, Taoyuan City
Chang Jung Christian University	CJCU	長榮大學	Gueiren District, Tainan
China Medical University	CMU	中國醫藥大學	Beitun District, Taichung
Chinese Culture University	CCU	中國文化大學	Shilin District, Taipei
Chung Hua University	CHU	中華大學	Xiangshan District, Hsinchu
Chung Shan Medical University	CSMU	中山醫學大學	South District, Taichung
Chung Yuan Christian University	CYCU	中原大學	Zhongli District, Taoyuan City
CTBC Business School	CTBC	中信金融管理學院	Annan District, Tainan
Dayeh University	DYU	大葉大學	Dacun Township, Changhua County
Feng Chia University	FCU	逢甲大學	Xitun District, Taichung
Fo Guang University	FGU	佛光大學	Jiaoxi Township, Yilan County
Fu Jen Catholic University	FJU	輔仁大學	Xinzhuang District, New Taipei
Hsuan Chuang University	HCU	玄奘大學	Xiangshan District, Hsinchu
Huafan University	HFU	華梵大學	Shiding District, New Taipei
I-Shou University	ISU	義守大學	Dashu District, Kaohsiung
Kainan University	KNU	開南大學	Luzhu District, Taoyuan City
Kaohsiung Medical University	KMU	高雄醫學大學	Sanmin District, Kaohsiung
Mackay Medical College	MMC	馬偕醫學院	Sanzhi District, New Taipei
Ming Chuan University	MCU	銘傳大學	Shilin District, Taipei; Guishan District, Taoyuan; Jinsha, Kinmen County; Michigan, USA
Nanhua University	NHU	南華大學	Dalin Township, Chiayi County
Providence University	PU	靜宜大學	Shalu District, Taichung
Shih Chien University	USC	實踐大學	Zhongshan District, Taipei; Neimen District, Kaohsiung
Shih Hsin University	SHU	世新大學	Wenshan District, Taipei
Soochow University	SCU	東吳大學	Shilin District, Taipei; Zhongzheng District, Taipei
Taipei Medical University	TMU	臺北醫學大學	Xinyi District, Taipei
Tamkang University	TKU	淡江大學	Tamsui District, New Taipei
Tatung University	TTU	大同大學	Zhongshan District, Taipei
Tunghai University	THU	東海大學	Xitun District, Taichung
Tzu Chi University	TCU	慈濟大學	Hualien City, Hualien County
University of Kang Ning	UKN	康寧大學	Annan District, Tainan
Yuan Ze University	YZU	元智大學	Zhongli District, Taoyuan City

== Technical and vocational education ==
=== Public ===
==== Universities of Science and Technology ====
Name	Abbr.	Chinese name	Location
National Chin-Yi University of Technology	NCUT	國立勤益科技大學	Taiping District, Taichung
National Formosa University	NFU	國立虎尾科技大學	Huwei Township, Yunlin County
National Kaohsiung University of Hospitality and Tourism	NKUHT	國立高雄餐旅大學	Siaogang District, Kaohsiung
National Kaohsiung University of Science and Technology	NKUST	國立高雄科技大學	Sanmin District, Kaohsiung; Nanzih District, Kaohsiung; Yanchao District, Kaohsiung; Cijin District, Kaohsiung
National Penghu University of Science and Technology	NPU	國立澎湖科技大學	Magong City, Penghu
National Pingtung University of Science and Technology	NPUST	國立屏東科技大學	Neipu Township, Pingtung County
National Taichung University of Science and Technology	NTCUST	國立臺中科技大學	North District, Taichung
National Taipei University of Business	NTUB	國立臺北商業大學	Zhongzheng District, Taipei; Pingzhen District, Taoyuan City
National Taipei University of Nursing and Health Science	NTUNHS	國立臺北護理健康大學	Beitou District, Taipei
National Taipei University of Technology	NTUT (TaipeiTech)	國立臺北科技大學	Daan District, Taipei
National Taiwan University of Science and Technology	TaiwanTech (NTUST)	國立臺灣科技大學	Daan District, Taipei Zhubei City, Hsinchu Zhonghe District, New Taipei
National Yunlin University of Science and Technology	YunTech (NYUST)	國立雲林科技大學	Douliu City, Yunlin County
==== Institutes and colleges ====
Name	Abbr.	Chinese name	Location
National Tainan Junior College of Nursing	NTJCN	國立臺南護理專科學校	West Central District, Tainan
National Taitung Junior College	NTC	國立臺東專科學校	Taitung City, Taitung County
National Taiwan College of Performing Arts	NTCPA	國立臺灣戲曲學院	Neihu District, Taipei

=== Private ===
==== Universities of science and technology ====
Name	Abbr.	Chinese name	Location
Asia Eastern University of Science and Technology	AEUST	亞東科技大學	Banqiao District, New Taipei
Central Taiwan University of Science and Technology	CTUST	中臺科技大學	Beitun District, Taichung
Chang Gung University of Science and Technology	CGUST	長庚科技大學	Guishan District, Taoyuan City; Puzi City, Chiayi County
Chaoyang University of Technology	CYUT	朝陽科技大學	Wufeng District, Taichung
Cheng Shiu University	CSU	正修科技大學	Niaosong District, Kaohsiung
Chia Nan University of Pharmacy and Science	CHNA	嘉南藥理大學	Rende District, Tainan
Chien Hsin University of Science and Technology	UCH	健行科技大學	Zhongli District, Taoyuan City
Chienkuo Technology University	CTU	建國科技大學	Changhua City, Changhua County
Chihlee University of Technology	CLUT	致理科技大學	Banqiao District, New Taipei
China University of Science and Technology	CUST	中華科技大學	Nangang District, Taipei
China University of Technology	CUTE	中國科技大學	Wenshan District, Taipei; Hukou Township, Hsinchu County
Chung Hwa University of Medical Technology	CUMT	中華醫事科技大學	Rende District, Tainan
Chungyu University of Film and Arts	CUFA	崇右影藝科技大學	Xinyi District, Keelung
Far East University	FEU	遠東科技大學	Sinshih District, Tainan
Fooyin University	FYU	輔英科技大學	Daliao District, Kaohsiung
Hsiuping University of Science and Technology	HUST	修平科技大學	Dali District, Taichung
Hungkuang University	HK	弘光科技大學	Shalu District, Taichung
HungKuo Delin University of Technology	HDUT	宏國德霖科技大學	Tucheng District, New Taipei
Hwa Hsia University of Technology	HWH	華夏科技大學	Zhonghe District, New Taipei
Jinwen University of Science and Technology	JUST	景文科技大學	Xindian District, New Taipei
Taiwan Steel University of Science and Technology	TSUST	台鋼科技大學	Lujhu District, Kaohsiung
Kun Shan University	KSU	崑山科技大學	Yongkang District, Tainan
Ling Tung University	LTU	嶺東科技大學	Nantun District, Taichung
Lunghwa University of Science and Technology	LHU	龍華科技大學	Guishan District, Taoyuan City
Meiho University	MU	美和科技大學	Neipu Township, Pingtung County
Ming Chi University of Technology	MCUT	明志科技大學	Taishan District, New Taipei
Minghsin University of Science and Technology	MUST	明新科技大學	Xinfeng Township, Hsinchu County
Nan Kai University of Technology	NKUT	南開科技大學	Caotun Township, Nantou County
Overseas Chinese University	OCU	僑光科技大學	Xitun District, Taichung
Shu-Te University	STU	樹德科技大學	Yanchao District, Kaohsiung
Southern Taiwan University of Science and Technology	STUST	南臺科技大學	Yongkang District, Tainan
St. John's University	SJU	聖約翰科技大學	Tamsui District, New Taipei
Ta Hwa University of Science and Technology	TUST	大華科技大學	Qionglin Township, Hsinchu County
Tainan University of Technology	TUT	臺南應用科技大學	Yongkang District, Tainan
Taipei City University of Science and Technology	TPCU	臺北城市科技大學	Beitou District, Taipei
Taipei University of Marine Technology	TUMT	台北海洋科技大學	Tamsui District, New Taipei
Tajen University	TAJEN	大仁科技大學	Yanpu Township, Pingtung County
Takming University of Science and Technology	TMUST	德明財經科技大學	Neihu District, Taipei
Tungnan University	TNU	東南科技大學	Shenkeng District, New Taipei
Vanung University	VNU	萬能科技大學	Zhongli District, Taoyuan City
Wenzao Ursuline University of Languages	WZU	文藻外語大學	Sanmin District, Kaohsiung
WuFeng University	WFU	吳鳳科技大學	Minxiong Township, Chiayi County
Yuanpei University of Medical Technology	YUMT	元培醫事科技大學	Xiangshan District, Hsinchu
Yu Da University of Science and Technology	YDU	育達科技大學	Zaoqiao Township, Miaoli County
==== Institutes and colleges of technology ====
Name	Abbr.	Chinese name	Location
Ching Kuo Institute of Management and Health	CKIMH	經國管理暨健康學院	Zhongshan District, Keelung
Dahan Institute of Technology	DAHAN	大漢技術學院	Xincheng Township, Hualien County Tanzi District, Taichung
Lee-Ming Institute of Technology	LIT	黎明技術學院	Taishan District, New Taipei
Nanya Institute of Technology	NANYA	南亞技術學院	Zhongli District, Taoyuan City
Tzu Hui Institute of Technology	TZUHUI	慈惠醫護管理專科學校	Nanzhou Township, Pingtung County
==== Junior colleges ====
Name	Abbr.	Chinese name	Location
Cardinal Tien College of Healthcare and Management	CTCN	耕莘健康管理專科學校	Xindian District, New Taipei
Chung Jen College of Nursing, Health Science and Management	CJC	崇仁醫護管理專科學校	East District, Chiayi City
Hsin Sheng College of Medical Care and Management	HSC	新生醫護管理專科學校	Longtan District, Taoyuan District
Jen-Teh Junior College of Medicine, Nursing and Management	JENTE	仁德醫護管理專科學校	Houlong Township, Miaoli County
Mackay Medicine, Nursing and Management College	MKC	馬偕醫護管理專科學校	Beitou District, Taipei
Min-Hwei College of Health Care Management	MHCHCM	敏惠醫護管理專科學校	Liouying District, Tainan
Shu Zen College of Medicine and Management	SZMC	樹人醫護管理專科學校	Lujhu District, Kaohsiung
St. Mary's Medicine Nursing and Management College	SMC	聖母醫護管理專科學校	Sanxing Township, Yilan County
Yuh-Ing Junior College of Health Care and Management	YUHING	育英醫護管理專科學校	Sanmin District, Kaohsiung

== Military and police academies ==
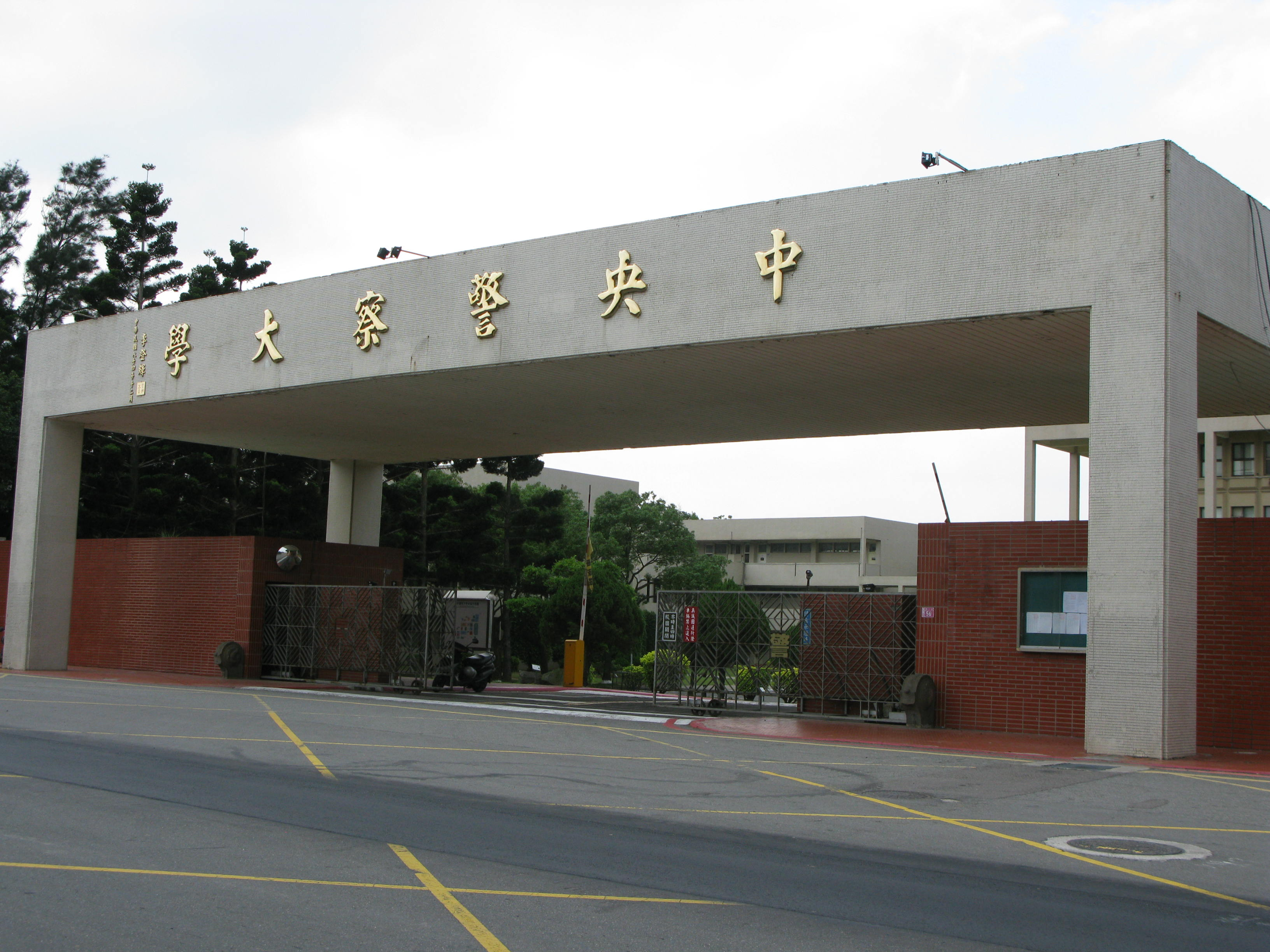
Central Police University

Name	Abbr.	Chinese name	Location
Air Force Institute of Technology	AFATS	空軍航空技術學院	Gangshan District, Kaohsiung
Army Academy R.O.C.	AAROC	陸軍專科學校	Zhongli District, Taoyuan City
Central Police University	CPU	中央警察大學	Guishan District, Taoyuan City
National Defense Medical Center	NDMC	國防醫學院	Neihu District, Taipei
National Defense University	NDU	國防大學	Bade District, Taoyuan City
Republic of China Air Force Academy	CAFA	中華民國空軍軍官學校	Gangshan District, Kaohsiung
Republic of China Military Academy	ROCMA	中華民國陸軍軍官學校	Fengshan District, Kaohsiung
Republic of China Naval Academy	CNA	中華民國海軍軍官學校	Zuoying District, Kaohsiung
Taiwan Police College	TPC	臺灣警察專科學校	Wenshan District, Taipei

== See also ==
- List of medical schools in Taiwan
- List of university mergers in Taiwan
- List of schools in the Republic of China reopened in Taiwan
- List of Chinese language schools in Taiwan for foreign students
- List of universities and colleges in Taipei
- Lists of universities and colleges
- Lists of universities and colleges by country
- University alliances in Taiwan
