= National Yunlin University of Science and Technology =

University in Yunlin County, Taiwan

- 國立雲林科技大學; YunTech, NYUST
- Motto: 誠敬恆新
- Motto in English: Sincerity, Honor, Perseverance, Originality
- Type: University of Science and Technology
- Established: established: 1991; 35 years ago Rename: 1997; 29 years ago
- Affiliations: AACSB; ACCSB; IEET; UMAP
- President: Neng-Shu, Yang
- Faculty: 406 (2022)
- Students: 9,532 (2022)
- Undergraduates: 6,511（2022）
- Postgraduates: 2,590（2022）
- Doctoral students: 431（2022）
- Location: Taiwan (Yunlin Campus), 64002; 23.695278°N 120.534167°E
- Campus: 58.1137 hectares
- Language: Chinese (Taiwan); English
- Colors: OrangeGreen
- Website: yuntech.edu.tw
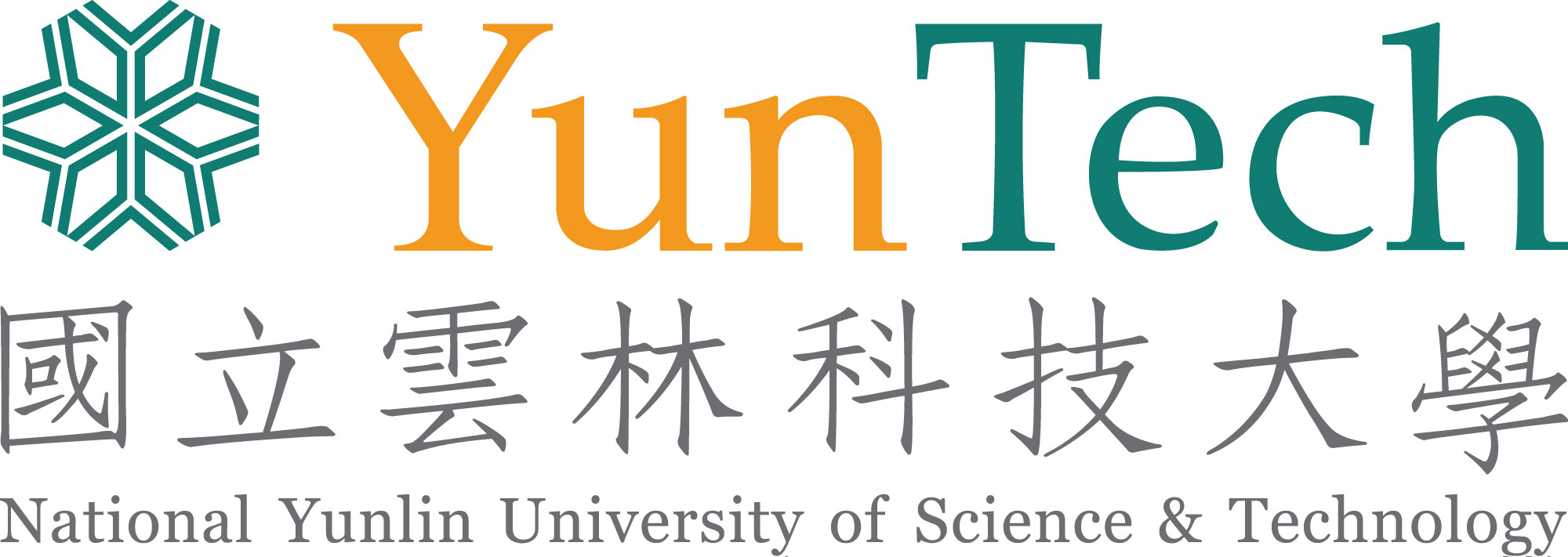

National Yunlin University of Science and Technology
- Traditional Chinese: 國立雲林科技大學
- Simplified Chinese: 国立云林科技大学
Transcriptions
Standard Mandarin
- Hanyu Pinyin: Guólì Yúnlín Kējì Dàxué
- Bopomofo: ㄍㄨㄛˊ ㄌㄧˋ ㄩㄣˊ ㄌㄧㄣˊ ㄎㄜ ㄐㄧˋ ㄉㄚˋ ㄒㄩㄝˊ
Southern Min
- Hokkien POJ: Kok-li̍p Hûn-lîm Kho-ki Tāi-ha̍k

National Yunlin University of Science and Technology (YunTech or simply NYUST, Chinese: 國立雲林科技大學; Pe̍h-ōe-jī: Kok-li̍p Hûn-lîm Kho-ki Tāi-ha̍k) is a university of science and technology in Taiwan. Founded in 1991 and located in Yunlin County. It was restructured as a technological university in 1997. It's a member of "National Yunlin University system" with National Taiwan University, and accredited by AACSB, ACCSB and IEET.

Yuntech is organized into several colleges, including the College of Engineering, College of Management, College of Design, College of Humanities and Applied Sciences, and College of Future.

Yuntech is currently the 3rd-ranked university of science and technology in Taiwan, on the rankings of Times Higher Education World University Rankings and U.S. News & World Report.

== History ==
In the beginning, Wenji Hsu (許文治; Pe̍h-ōe-jī: Khó͘ Bûn-tī), the then governor of Yunlin County, believed that there was only one College in Yunlin County, which was disparate compared to other counties and cities, so the development of high-level education standards in Yunlin was a top priority. Initially, he did not succeed in his bid to get National Chung Cheng University established in Yunlin, so he continued to fight for the establishment of a university of the high level, with the goal of "contributing to the development of education in Yunlin". At the beginning of the school's construction, the County Government provided the Ministry of Education as the site for the school's construction. In addition, Yunlin Junior High School had to be relocated due to the establishment of the Yunlin Institute of Technology.

=== National Yunlin Institute of Technology (1989–1997) ===
- The Executive Yuan approved the establishment of the Preparatory Office and the Ministry of Education approved the establishment of the National Yunlin Institute of Technology in 1989. Dr. Wen-Hsiung Chang (張文雄; Pe̍h-ōe-jī: Tiuⁿ Bûn-hiông), then president of National Taipei University of Technology, was appointed as the director of the preparatory office.
- National Yunlin Institute of Technology was officially established on July 1, 1991, with 352 new students, and the first president was Dr.Wen-Hsiung Chang, the director of preparatory work. On August 1 of the year, the first phase of construction was completed, and eight departments were initially established: mechanical engineering, electrical engineering, electronic engineering, industrial management, business management, information management, industrial design, and business design.
- In accordance with the Ministry of Education to encourage the conversion of meritorious schools into technical colleges, National Yunlin Institute of Technology was renamed National Yunlin University of Science and Technology (Yuntech). Along with National Taiwan University of Science and Technology and Chaoyang University of Technology were the first batch of technical colleges in Taiwan to be successfully converted into technical universities.

=== National Yunlin University of Science and Technology (1997–present) ===
- In 2001, President Wen-Hsiung Chang retired and was succeeded by Dr. cōng-míng Lin (林聰明) as the second president, with the goal of "building a humanistic learning environment, and making every effort to promote industrialization, e-corporation, and internationalization."
- In 2005, Cheers Magazine's Best Universities Guide ranked National Yunlin University of Science and Technology 9th in the country for the amount of money spent per person on student talent and research ethos.
- In 2009, Dr. Yǒngbīn Yáng (楊永斌), a tenured professor at National Taiwan University, took over the presidency of Yunlin University of Science and Technology, with the goal of developing "a strong academic culture and first-class creativity.
- On December 6, 2018, signed a memorandum of cooperation with National Taiwan University, and National Formosa University to establish the National Yunlin University Consortium.

=== Campus life ===
Yuntech Campus

YunTech is located in Douliu, Yunlin County, Central Taiwan, with access via highways and railway system, 226 km south of Taipei, capital city of Taiwan. The university occupies about 60 hectares. 8 artistic works are placed around the campus, and the Art Center of YunTech periodically holds exhibitions.

The library totals 16,529 square meters and has 1,750,000 volumes in its collection which include journals in Chinese and other languages, e-database and e-learning resources. It also includes online databases in all subject areas for technological universities nationwide.

YunTech hosted the National Intercollegiate Athletic Games in 2006 and 2014.

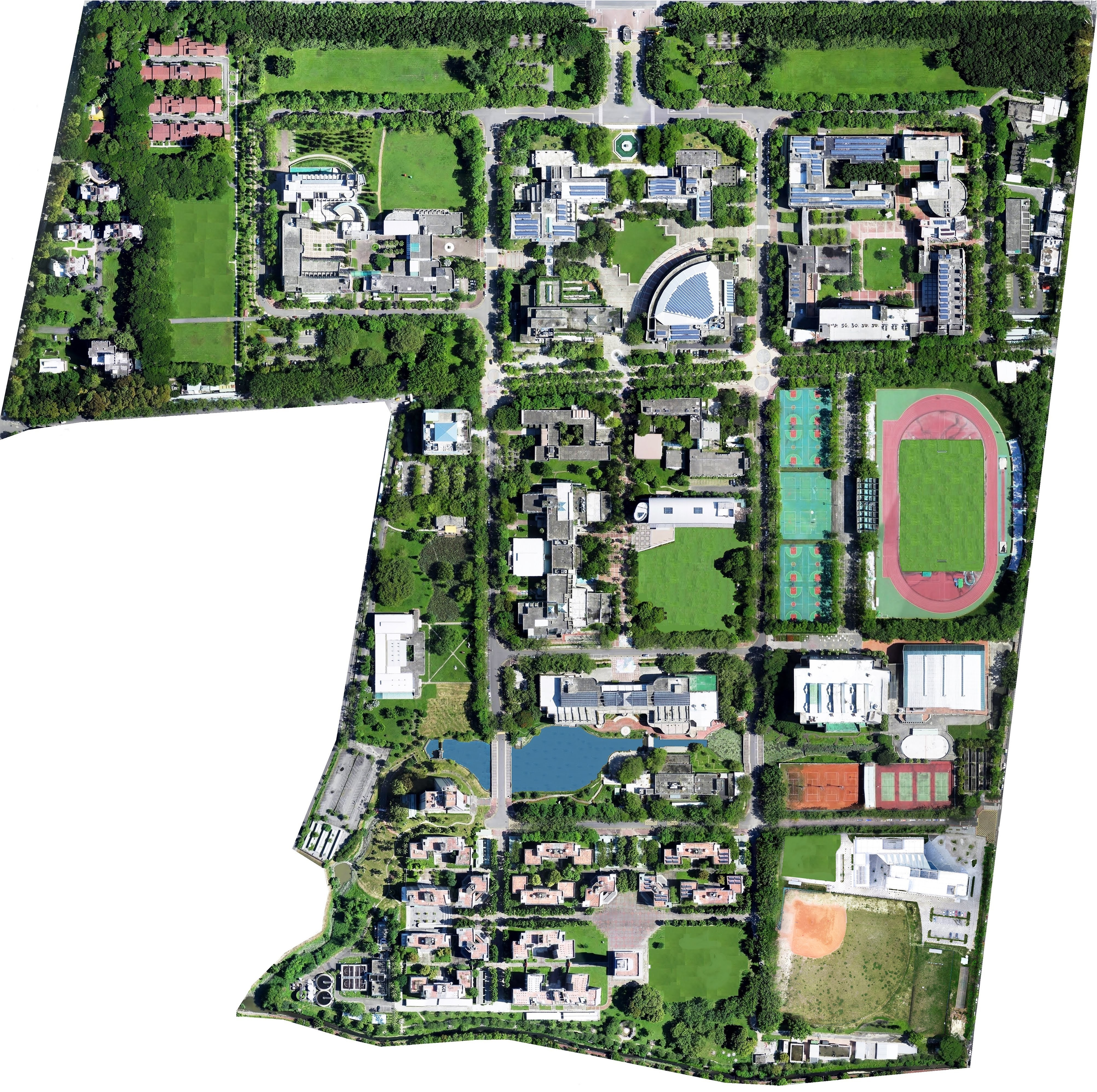
YunTech Aerial Photography

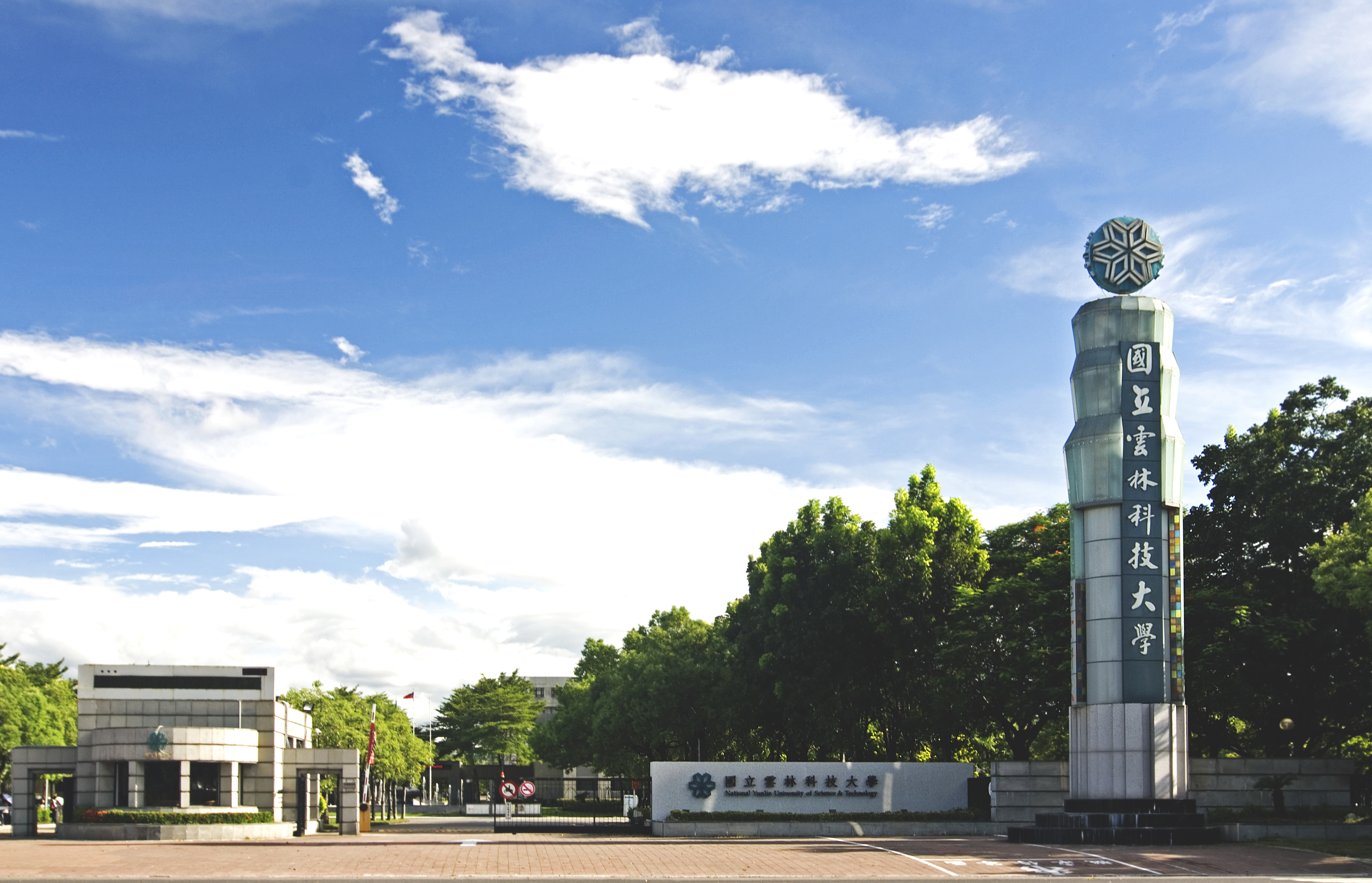
Yuntech Campus Entrance

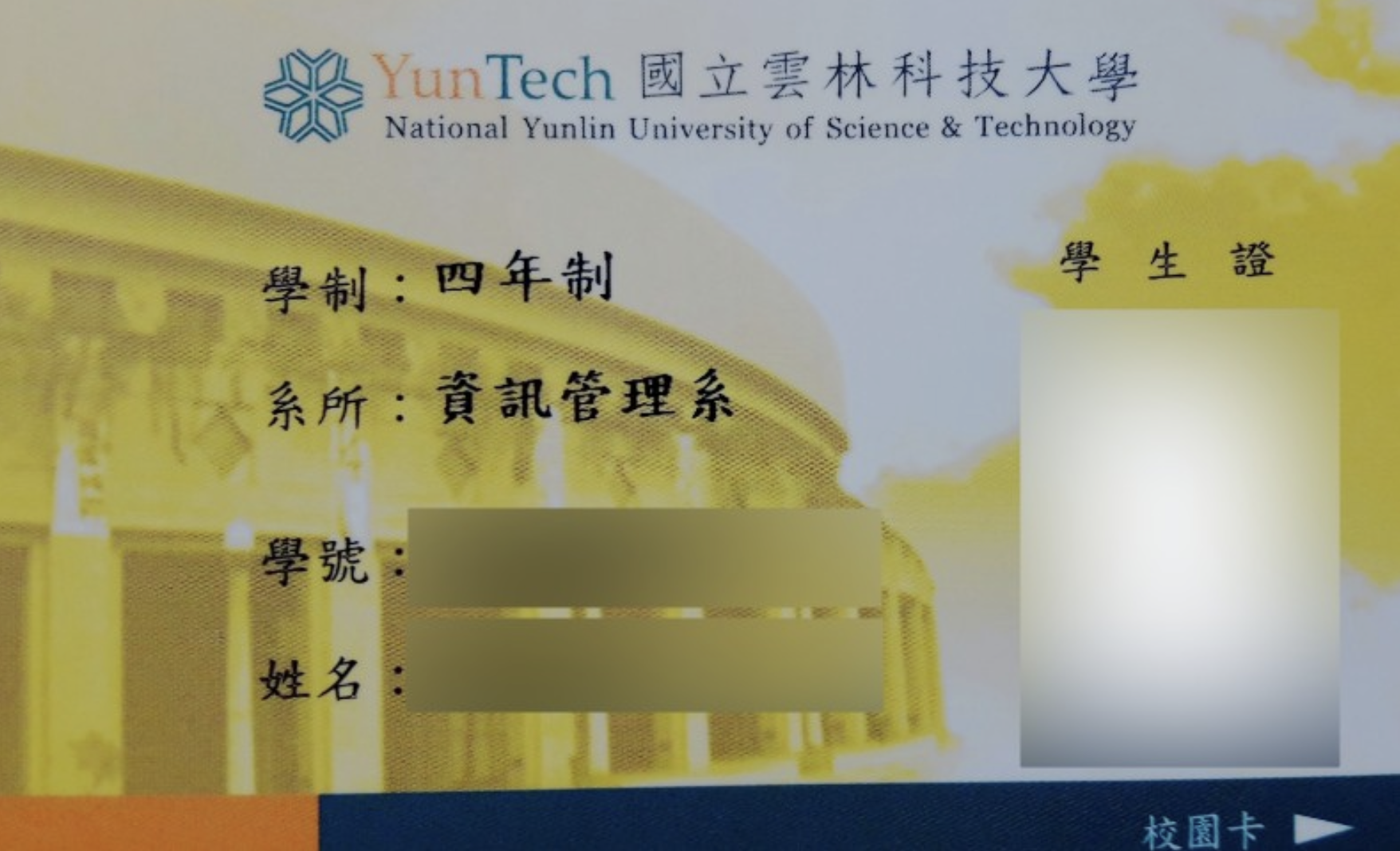
Yuntech Student ID Card 2017

== List of presidents ==
No	Name	Since	Experience	Current
1	Zhāng wénxióng	1991─2001	Presidents of National Kaohsiung University of Applied Sciences; Presidents of National Taipei University of Technology; Presidents of Lunghwa University of Science and Technology	Retired
2	Lín cōngmíng	2001─2009	Professor of National Taiwan University of Science and Technology; Deputy Ministry of Ministry of Education; Director General of Executive Yuan	Presidents of Nanhua University
3	Yáng yǒngbīn	2009─2013	Director of National Taiwan University; Doctor of City University of Hong Kong	Fellow of Chinese Academy of Engineering
4	Hóu chūn kàn	2013─2017	Vice-Pre of National Yunlin University of Science and Technology	Professor of Mechanical Engineering
5	Yáng néng shū	2017─Present	Vice-Pr of National Yunlin University of Science and Technology	Presidents of National Yunlin University of Science and Technology

== Colleges and schools ==
=== College ===
College	Department	Department(Chinese)
College of Engineering	Graduate School of Engineering Science and Technology	工程科技研究所
College of Engineering	Mechanical Engineering	機械工程系
College of Engineering	Electrical Engineering	電機工程系
College of Engineering	Electronic Engineering	電子工程系
College of Engineering	Safety Health and Environmental Engineering	環境與安全衛生工程系
College of Engineering	Chemical and Materials Engineering	化學工程與材料工程系
College of Engineering	Construction Engineering	營建工程系
College of Engineering	Computer Science and Information Engineering	資訊工程系
College of Management	Business Administration	企業管理系
College of Management	Industrial Engineering and Management	工業工程與管理系
College of Management	Computer Science and Information Management	資訊管理系
College of Management	Finance	財務金融系
College of Management	Accounting	會計系
College of Management	International Graduate Institute of Artificial Intelligence	國際人工智慧管理研究所
College of Management	International Business Administration	國際管理學士學位學程
College of Management	Master Program in Entrepreneurial Management (EMMBA)	創業管理碩士學位學程
College of Management	Doctoral Program in Industrial Management	產業經營專業博士學位學程
College of Management	Executive Master Program in Business Administration	高階管理碩士學位學程
College of Management	Bechelor Program in Business and Management	工商管理學士學位學程
College of Design	Graduate School of Design, Master & Doctoral Program.	設計學研究所
College of Design	Industrial Design	工業設計系
College of Design	Visual Communication Design	視覺傳達設計系
College of Design	Architecture & Interior Design	建築與室內設計系
College of Design	Digital Media Design	數位媒體設計系
College of Design	Creative Design	創意生活設計系
College of Humanities and Applied Sciences	Applied Foreign Languages	應用外語系
College of Humanities and Applied Sciences	Cultural Heritage Conservation	文化資產維護系
College of Humanities and Applied Sciences	Graduate School of Technological and Vocational Education	技術及職業教育研究所
College of Humanities and Applied Sciences	Graduate School of Applied Chinese Studies	漢學應用研究所
College of Humanities and Applied Sciences	Graduate School of Science and Technology Law	科技法律研究所
College of Humanities and Applied Sciences	Graduate School of Leisure and Exercise Studies	休閒運動研究所
College of Humanities and Applied Sciences	Materials Science	材料科技研究所
College of Humanities and Applied Sciences	Teacher Education Center	師資培育中心
College of Future	Graduated School of Intelligent Data Science	智慧數據科學研究所
College of Future	General Education Center	通識教育中心
College of Future	Bechelor Program in Interdisciplinary Studies	前瞻學士學位學程
College of Future	Bachelor Program in Industrial Projects(BPIP)	產業專案學士學位學程
College of Future	Bachetor Program in Industrial Technology(BPIT)	產業科技學士學位學程

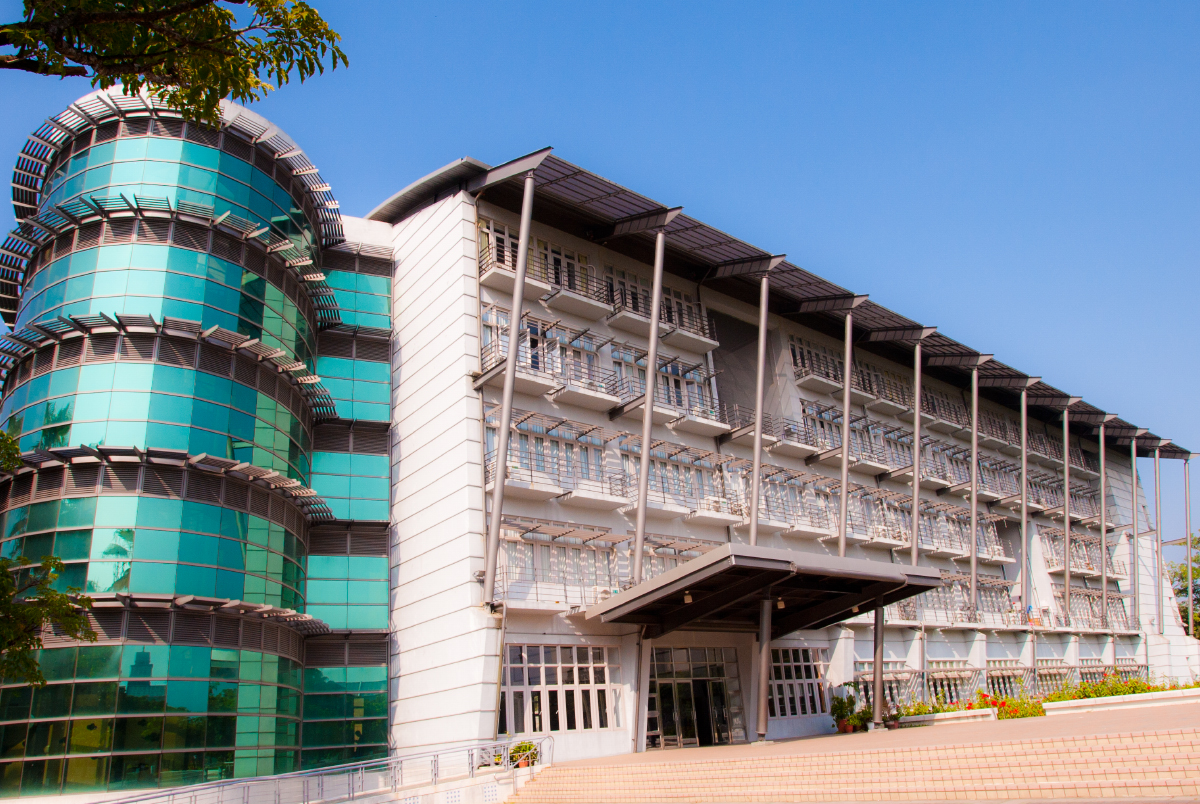
College of Design

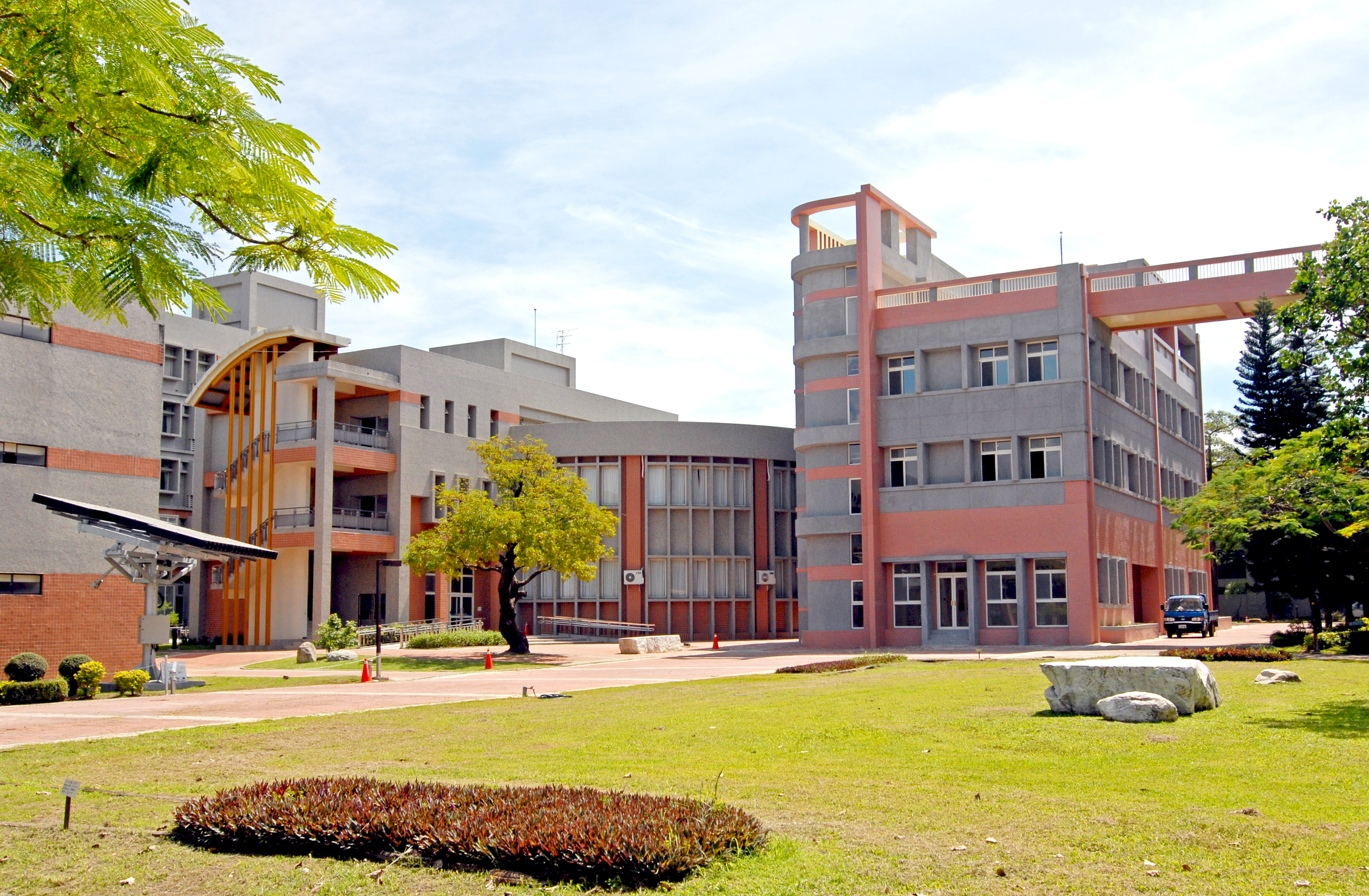
College of Engineering

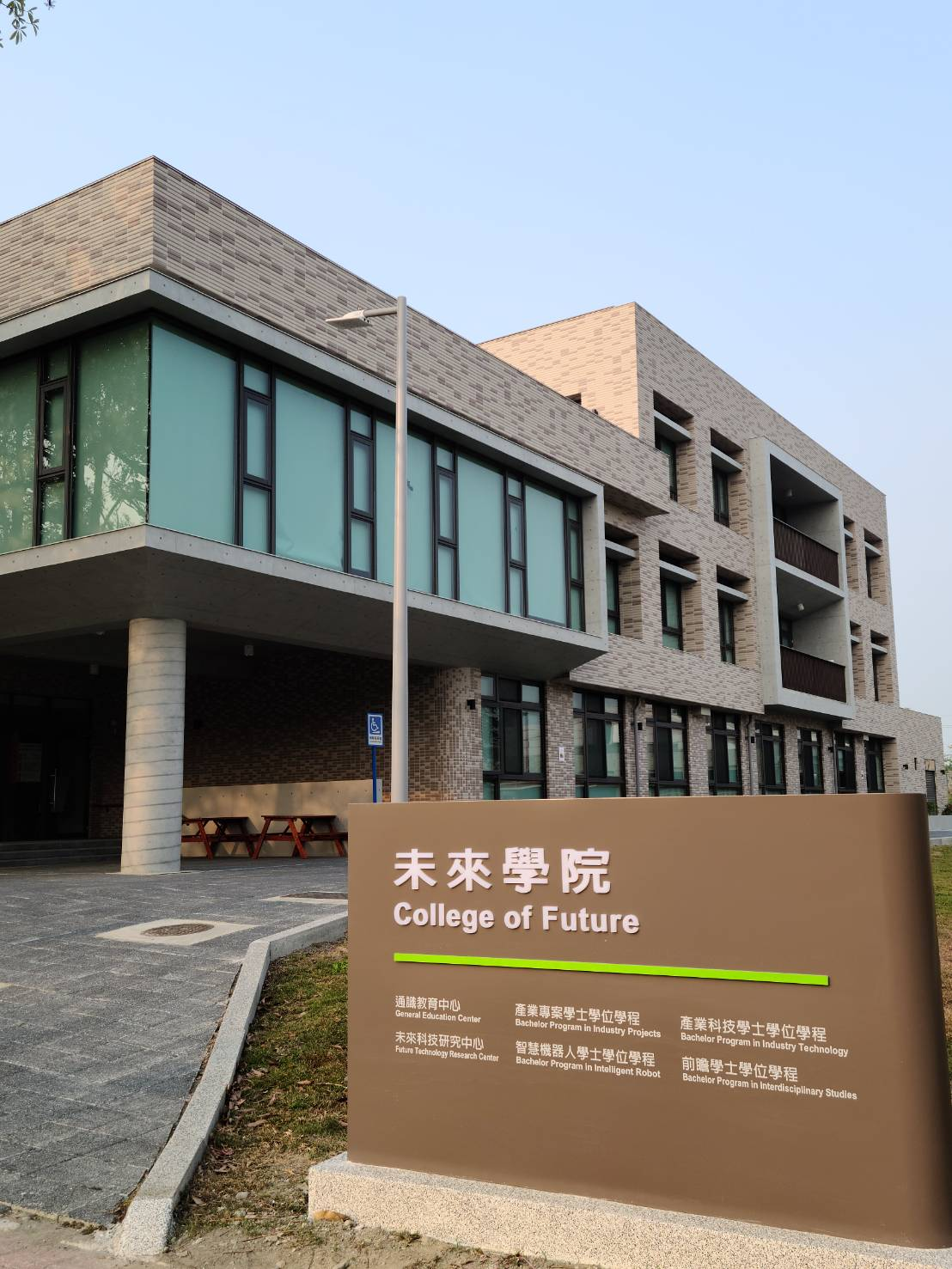
College of Future

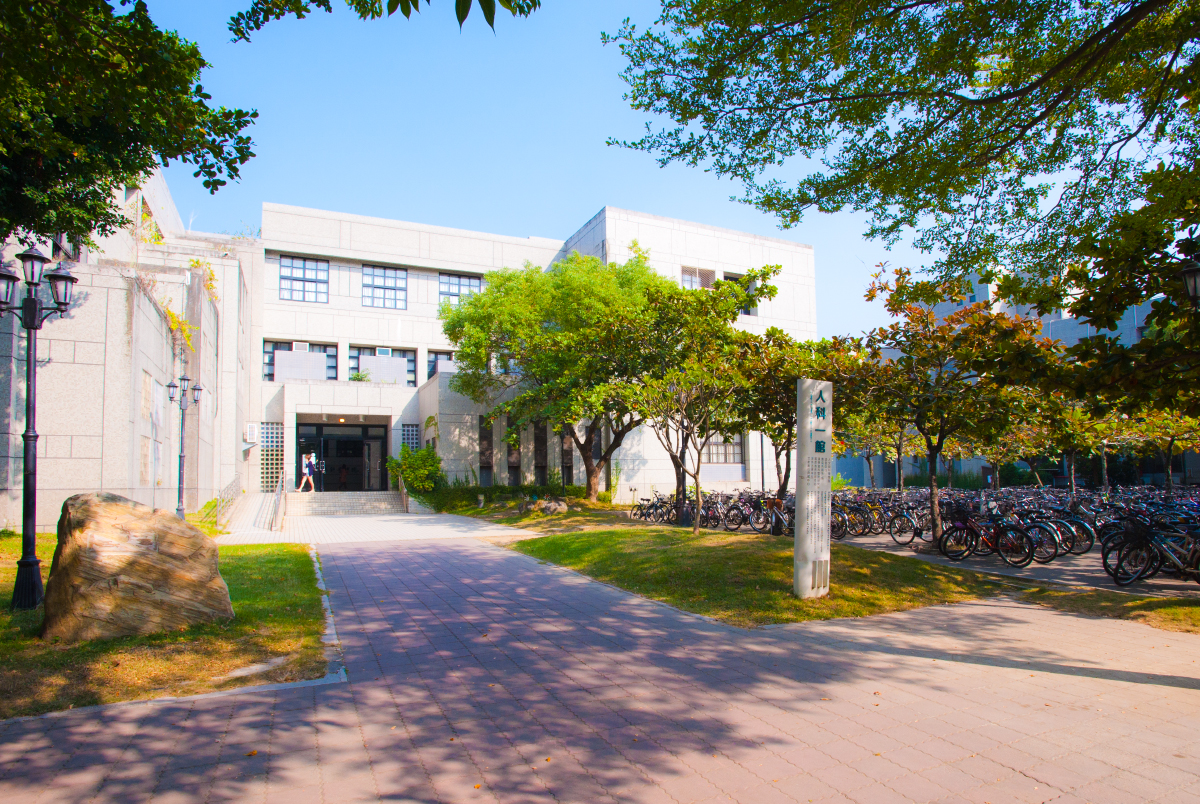
College of Humanities and Applied Sciences

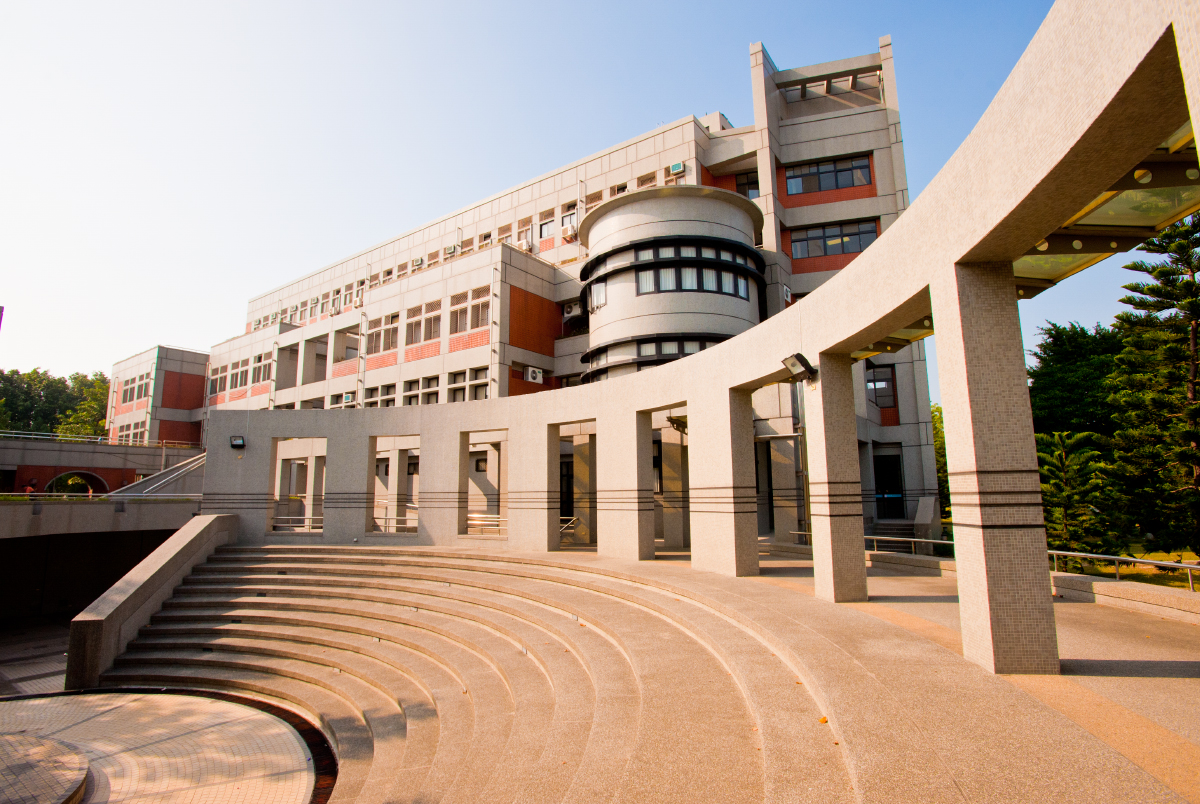
College of Management

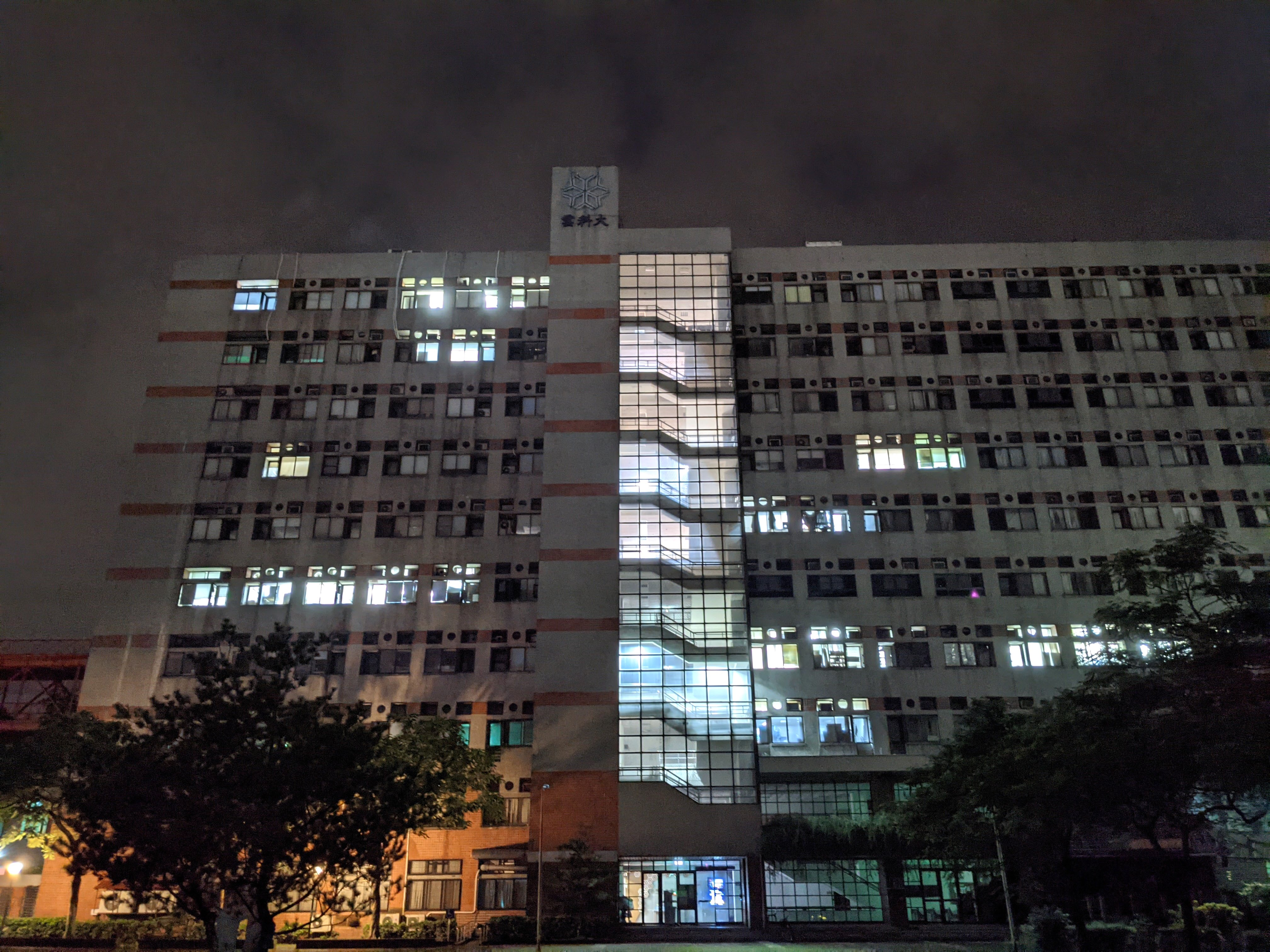
Yuntech at Night

== Rankings and reputation ==
University rankings

Global – Overall
- ARWU World: 801-900 (2022)
- CWUR World: 1933 (2023)
- RUR World: 842 (2023)
- THE World: 501-600 (2024)
- THE Young Universities: 301-350 (2022)
- USNWR Global: 1730 (2022)

Regional – Overall
- QS Asia: 401–450 (2023)
- THE Asia: 251–300 (2022)
- USNWR Asia: 649 (2023)

National – Overall
- ARWU National: 14 (2022)
- CWUR National: 31 (2023)
- THE National: 7 (2023)
- USNWR National: 25 (2022)

National Yunlin University of Science and Technology is ranked 501-600 in the world by the Times Higher Education 2024, 1931st in the world by CWUR, and 1730th by U.S. News & World Report.

== Campus ==
National Yunlin University of Science and Technology (Yuntech) is located in Douliu City, Yunlin County. The campus area covers 56.1 hectares and is adjacent to the Taiwan Route 78 Gukeng Interchange, National Freeway 1, and National Freeway 3. The representative Yunmeng Lake is located in the south near the student dormitory, and the lotus pond near the creative workshop is filled with lotus flowers during the lotus viewing season from May to October every year. Some of the campus facilities of National Yunlin University of Science and Technology have been listed as Cultural Assets of Yunlin, such as the Yunxu Building, which was originally the school building of Yunlin Junior High School, the first national high school building built in Yunlin County.

=== Yuntai Performance Hall ===
Yuntai Performance Hall is a fan-shaped building that will be completed in 2021. The YunTech Auditorium was formerly an auditorium built in 1994, and initially functioned as a lecture hall. The name Yun (雲) stands for "Cloud", which means "clouds", and also symbolizes National Yunlin University of Science and Technology. And "Tai"(泰), which means "peace and prosperity" and "greatness" in chinese.

=== Arts Center and Library ===
The Art Center is adjacent to the main library on campus.

=== Yunxu Building ===
Located next to the College of Engineering, Yunxu Building was originally the first building of Yunlin Junior High School when it was founded in the 57th year of the R.O.C.

=== College of Design department Three ===
Located along the central axis, the greenery on the north side of the base and the planting on the north side of the Design Center form a continuation of the green belt.

=== Longtan Road ===
Long Tan Road runs through the campus of Yunlin University of Science and Technology and is a must-use road for Yunlin students to commute to work and live conveniently nearby. In the early days, the red brick pavement was in disrepair and often involved in car accidents until September 2016 when the road was repaved and refurbished with tarmac.

Facility

1 / Bridge between Student Dormitory and Student Center or other facilities; 2 / YunTech Lake(Lotus Pond)	3 / Student Center; 4 / International Corner

Facilities of YunTech
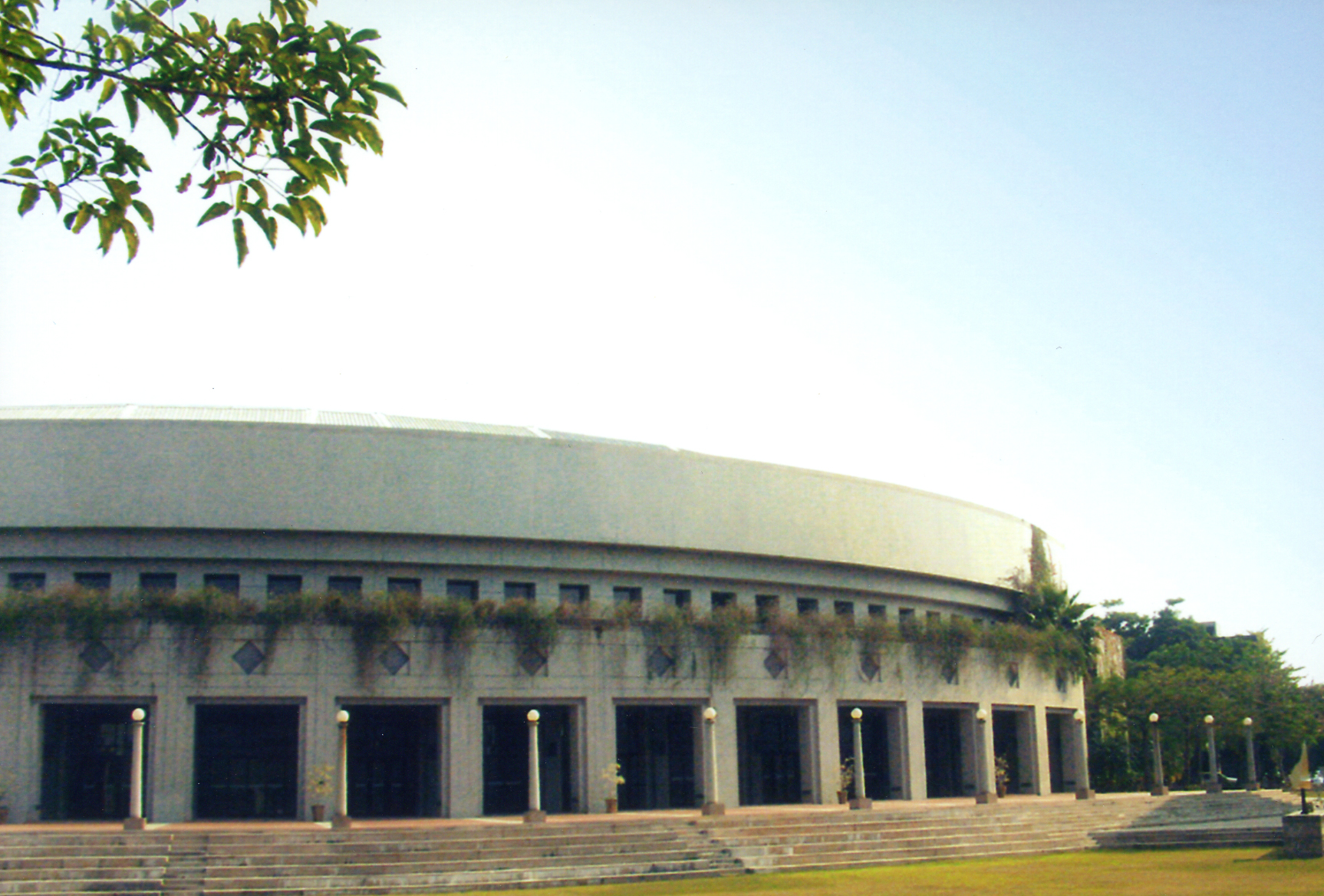
The Grand Auditorium

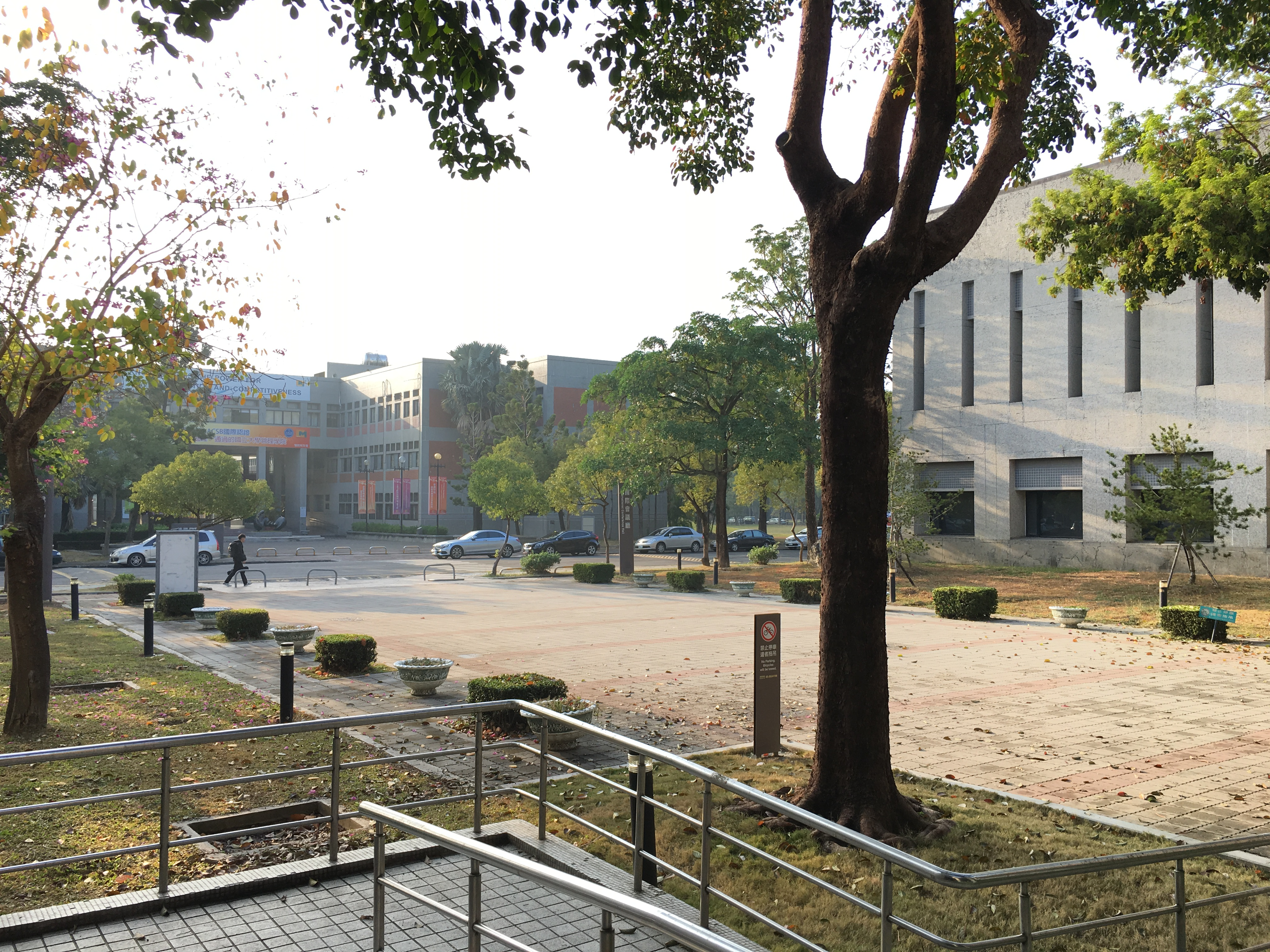
Pathway between library and college of management

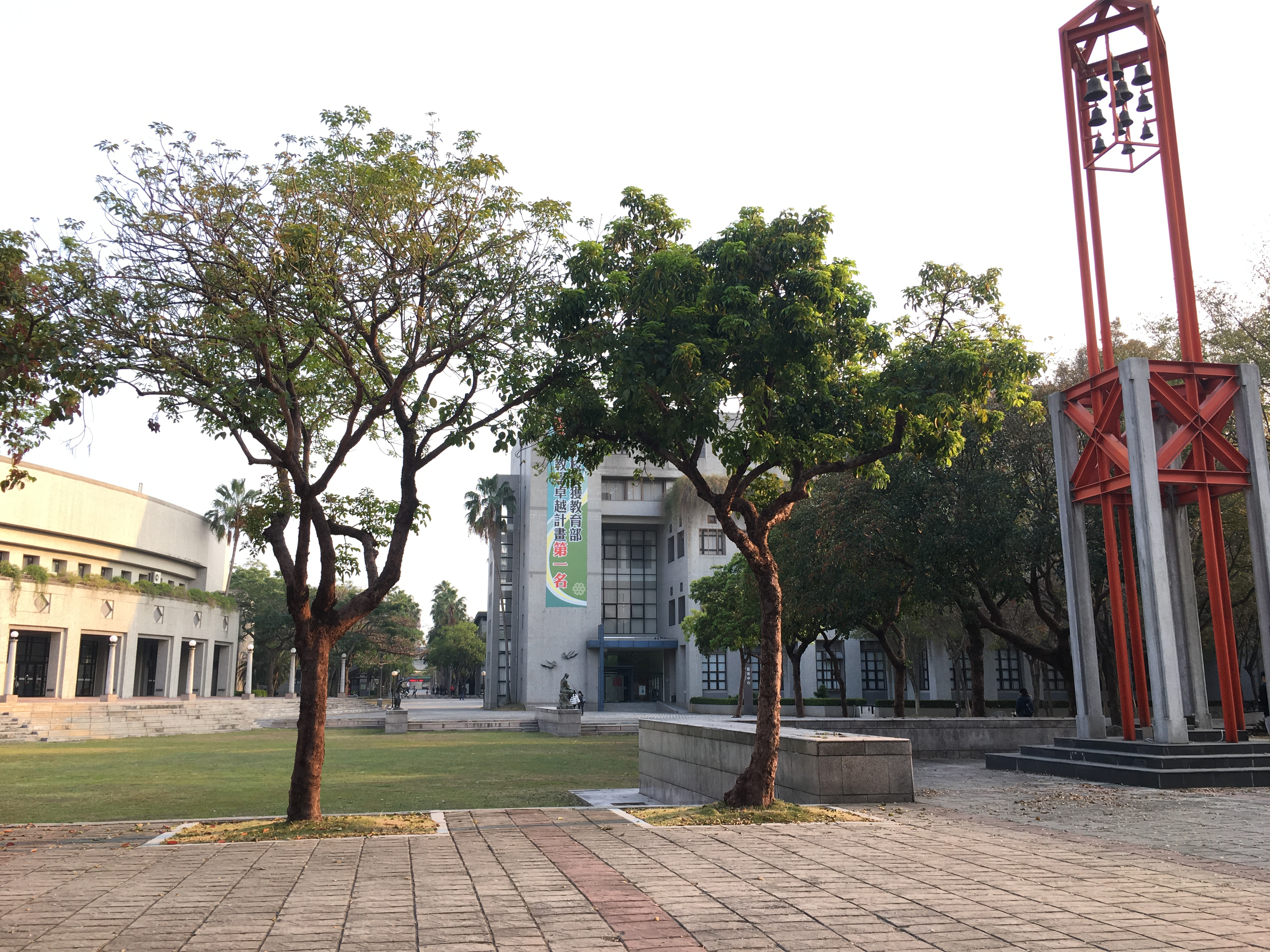
YunTay Performance Hall and Yunbell tower

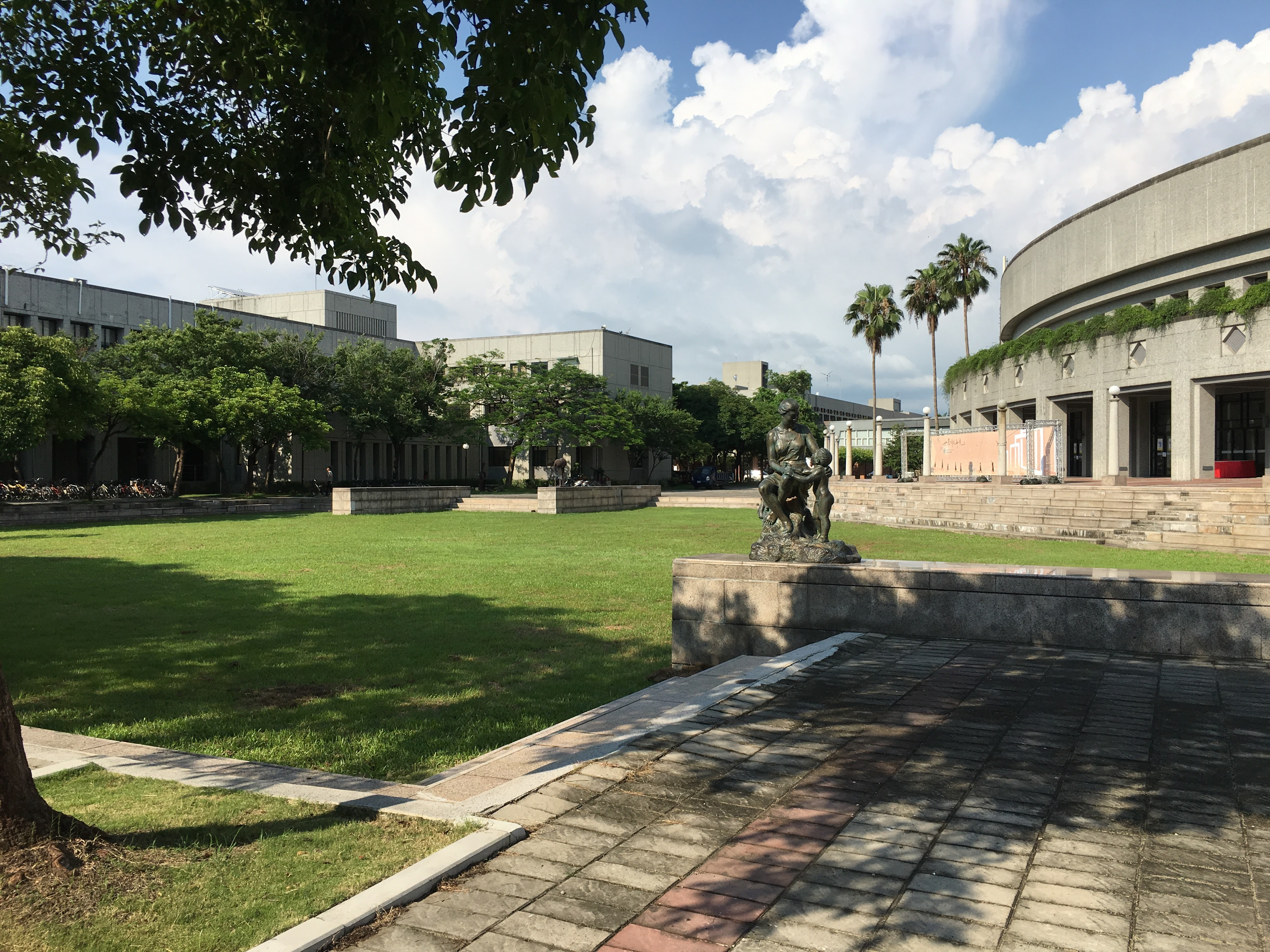
Lawn in front of YunTay Performance Hall

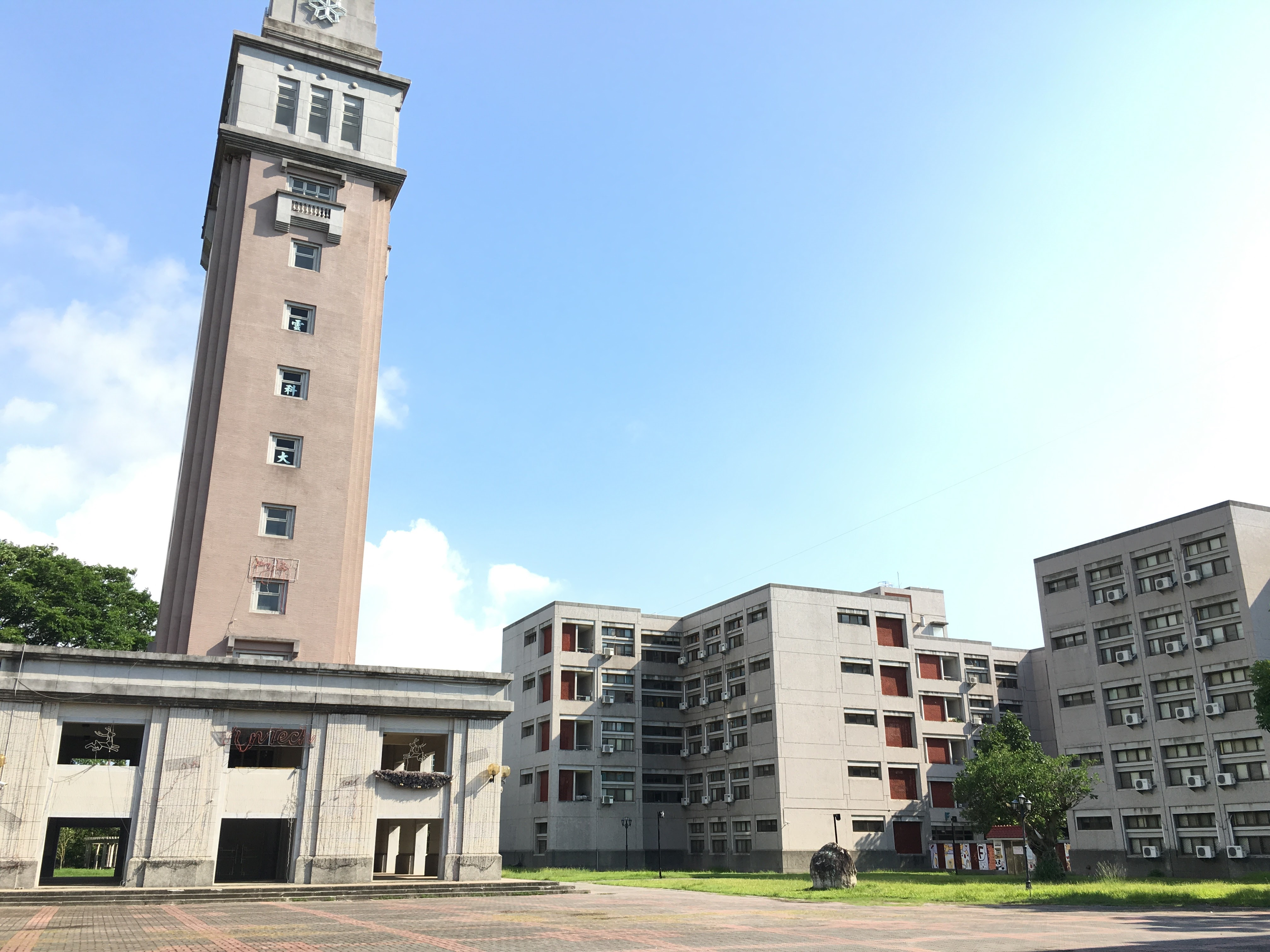
Clouds Pavilion

== See also ==
- List of universities in Taiwan
- List of universities in Taiwan § Universities of science and technology
