= IEET =

IEET may refer to:

- Institute for Ethics and Emerging Technologies
- Institute of Engineering and Emerging Technologies, former name of Baddi University of Emerging Sciences and Technologies
- Institute of Engineering Education Taiwan
