= Arun Kumar Sangaiah =

Indian academic researcher

- Born: 7 May 1981 (age 45)
- Education: Ph.D. in Computer Science and Engineering, VIT University, Vellore, (2014)
- Occupation: Professor
- Employer(s): National Yunlin University of Science and Technology Yunlin, Taiwan.

Arun Kumar Sangaiah is an academic researcher, currently a Distinguished Professor, International Graduate School of Artificial Intelligence, National Yunlin University of Science and Technology Yunlin, Taiwan.

He was awarded Clarivate Highly Cited Researcher in the world in Engineering and Technology consecutively in the years 2021, 2022, and 2023.

== Education ==
Sangaiah is an Indian scholar, researcher, who earned his Ph.D. in Computer Science and Engineering from Vellore Institute of Technology, University, Vellore, India.

== Career ==
Professor Sangaiah’s research interests encompass a range of topics, including Artificial Intelligence (AI), Internet of Things (IoT), Sustainable Computing, Deep Learning, Smart Vehicles, Convolutional Neural Network, Recurrent Neural Network, Sentiment Analysis, Service Quality, Unmanned Aerial Vehicles and other similar topics.

In 2015, he became the Senior Member, IEEE Computer Society and Senior Member, IEEE Industrial Electronics Society.

He is an Editor in Chief, Elsevier Book Series, Cognitive Data Science in Sustainable Computing, Editor in Chief, International Journal of Cognitive Computing in Engineering, KeAi Publishing, Editor in Chief, CRC Book Series, Edge AI in Future Computing, Routledge, and as an editor and associate editor for other journals.

== Awards and Recognitions ==
- Yushan Young Scholar Award(2019), Ministry of Education (MOE), Taiwan
- PIFI Visiting Fellow Award (Fellowship from Chinese Academy of Sciences - CAS)
