= Poding Memorial Library =

Academic library in Wufeng, Taichung, Taiwan

Poding Memorial Library 波錠紀念圖書館
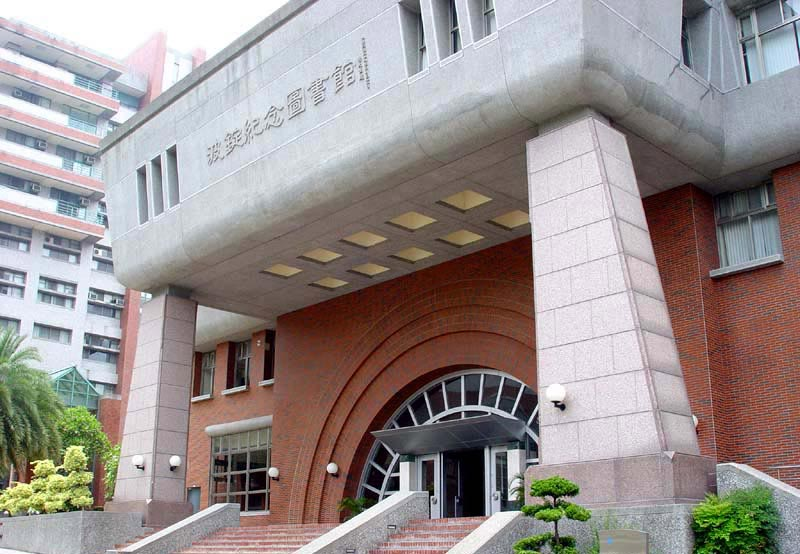
- 24°04′08.8″N 120°42′48.5″E
- Location: Wufeng, Taichung, Taiwan
- Type: Academic library
- Established: 11 October 1994

Collection

Other information
- Website: pmlis.cyut.edu.tw/pmlisenx/

Poding Memorial Library (Chinese: 波錠紀念圖書館; pinyin: Bōdìng Jìniàn Túshūguǎn) is the library at Chaoyang University of Technology in Wufeng District, Taichung, Taiwan, established in 1994. The construction of the new library building began in June 1997, and was completed in March 1999.

== History ==
The first class of Chaoyang University of Technology started in August 1994, and the library opened on October 11 of the same year. The third floor of the university's Teaching Building temporarily served as the library's quarters. It was divided into a periodical and reference room, stacks, and a reading room. Afterward, the collection of the library increased so rapidly that in order to satisfy the needs of users, it became necessary to add western book stacks and more separate rooms in November 1996. After a year of planning, the construction of the new library building began on June 28, 1997, and was completed in March 1999. In 1999 September, the library was closed after partial destruction resulting from the 1999 Jiji earthquake. It was later reopened in October 1999. "Poding Memorial Library is to commemorate parents of the founder of Chaoyang, Dr. Yang Tien-sheng".

== Holdings ==
TYPE	VOLUMES / TYPES
Total Collection	583,811 volumes
Eastern Language Collection	413,967 volumes
Western Language Collection	130,279 volumes
Non-Book Collection	39,565 volumes
Periodical Collection	325 titles
Newspaper Collection	7 titles
Databases	252 types
E-books	1,092,021 types
E-journals	110,321 types

Update: 4/2026

== Service ==
- Reading Services
- Loan Services
- Information Retrieval Services
- Multi-media Services
- Outreach Activities
- Copy Utilities
- Book Search Services
- Book Recommendation services
- Rush Catalog Request
- Reference Services
- Inter-Library Cooperation
- Reserved Books
- Subject Advisor service

== Floor plan ==
First Floor	Reading Room, Conference Room, Compact Shelves Area
Second Floor	The Exhibition Hall of the University History, Circulation, Newspapers, Online Search, Reference Collections, Reserved Books, Further Studies & Careers Information, Faculty & Student Publications/Dissertations, Taiwan Taoyuan International Airport Access MRT Infrastructure Project, Book Return
Third Floor	Poding Memorial Hall, Periodicals, Back Issue Newspapers
Fourth Floor	The Exhibition Hall of the University History, Western Languages Collections, Eastern Languages Collections, Design Collections, Prayer Room
Fifth Floor	Multimedia, Music & Leisure Area, IR Classroom, Group Audio-Visual Room, Maker Space, Cosy Movie Corner, Live Audio Room
Sixth Floor	Eastern Languages Collections, Group Study Room
Seventh Floor	Faculty Office
Basement First	Parking lot

== See also ==
- Chaoyang University of Technology
