= Democratic Times Museum =

Museum in Wufeng, Taichung, Taiwan

- 立法院民主時刻館
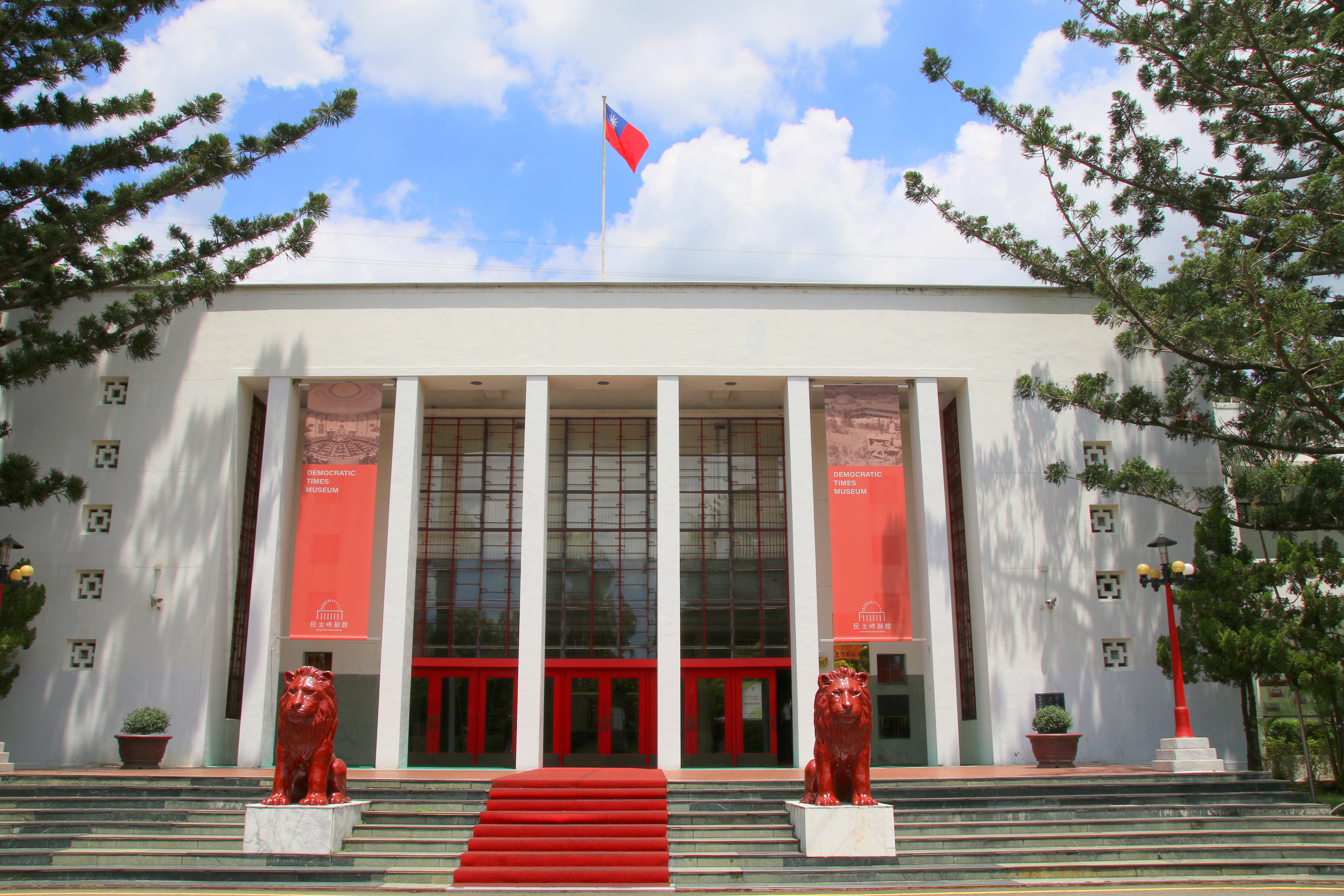
- Former name: Taiwan Provincial Consultative Council
- Established: 2021
- Location: Wufeng, Taichung, Taiwan
- Coordinates: 24°03′14.1″N 120°42′00.5″E
- Type: museum

The Democratic Times Museum (traditional Chinese: 立法院民主時刻館; simplified Chinese: 立法院民主时刻馆; pinyin: Lìfǎyuàn Mínzhǔ Shíkè Guǎn) is a museum in Wufeng District, Taichung, Taiwan.

== History ==
The museum building was originally constructed for the Taiwan Provincial Consultative Council. After the council was defunded in December 2018, the building was then transformed into a museum in 2021.

== Architecture ==
The museum building consists of the provincial assembly hall and the provincial assembly president's office. The assembly hall is located in a room with a round dome structure.

== See also ==
- List of museums in Taiwan
