= National Taiwan Symphony Orchestra =

- Orchestra
- Logo of the National Taiwan Symphony Orchestra
- Native name: 國立臺灣交響樂團
- Short name: NTSO
- Founded: 1945
- Location: Wufeng, Taichung, Taiwan
- Principal conductor: Fusao Kajima

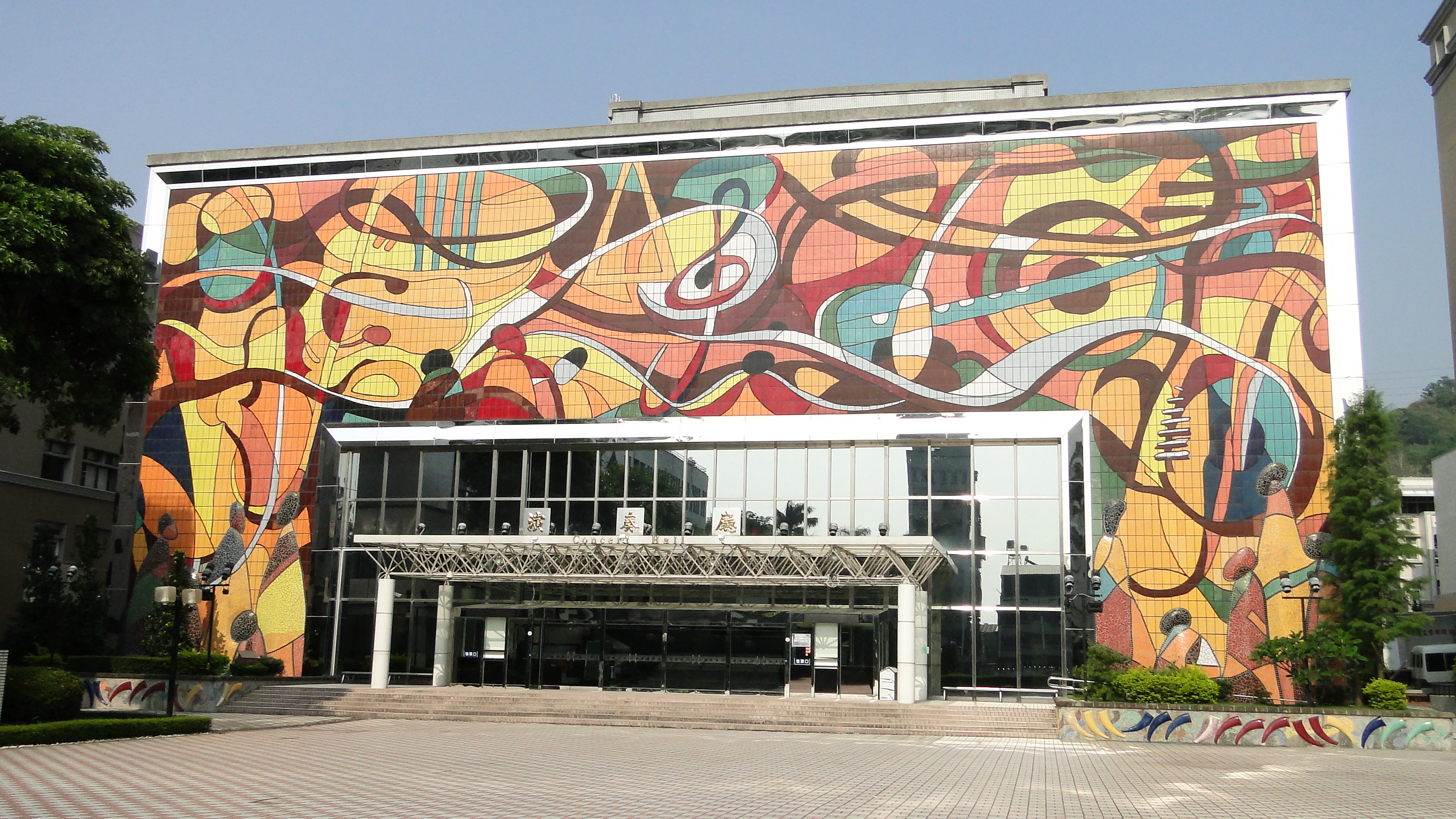
Wufeng Hall of the National Taiwan Symphony Orchestra

The National Taiwan Symphony Orchestra (NTSO; Chinese: 國立臺灣交響樂團; pinyin: Guólì Táiwān Jiāoxiǎng Yuètuán), founded in 1945, is the oldest symphony orchestra in Taiwan. It is based in Wufeng, Taichung.

== Conductors ==
=== Principal Guest Conductor ===
- Lan Shui (首席客席指揮:水藍), 2019-present

=== Past Conductors ===
- Fusao Kajima (梶間聡夫), 2009
- Chiu Chun-chiang (邱君強), 2006–2009

=== Assistant Conductors ===
- Fan, Kaih-Si (范楷西), 2015-2018
- Wang, Yu-Yin (王昱尹), 2018–2019
- Yeh, Cheng-Te (葉政德), 2019-2022
- Wu, Hung-I (巫竑毅), 2024–

== General Directors ==
- Tsai Chih-kue (蔡繼琨)1945-1949
- Wang Shin-chi (王錫奇)1949-1960
- Day Tsuei-lung (戴粹倫)1960-1973
- Shin Wei-liang (史惟亮)1973-1974
- Deng Han-chin (鄧漢錦)1974-1991
- Chen Tscheng-Hsiung (陳澄雄)1991-2002
- Su Chung (蘇忠)2002-2005
- Ko Chi-liang (柯基良)2005-2007
- Liu Shuan-yung (劉玄詠)2007-2011; 2016 - present

== Artistic Advisor ==
- Lan Shui (水藍) 2011-2014
- Chien Wen-pin (簡文彬)2016-2016

== Affiliates ==
- NTSO Wind Ensemble
- NTSO Youth Band

== See also ==
- List of symphony orchestras in Taiwan
