= Liu Ping-wei =

Taiwanese politician (1952–2020)

- 劉炳偉

Member of the Legislative Yuan
- In office 1 February 1999 – 31 January 2002
- Constituency: Taipei County

Speaker of the Taiwan Provincial Council
- In office 20 December 1994 – 19 December 1998
- Preceded by: Chien Ming-ching
- Succeeded by: Lin Po-jung as Speaker of the Taiwan Provincial Consultative Council

Deputy Speaker of the Taiwan Provincial Assembly
- In office 1 February 1993 – 19 December 1994
- Leader: Chien Ming-ching
- Preceded by: Huang Chen-yu
- Succeeded by: Yang Wen-hsin

Member of the Taiwan Provincial Assembly
- In office 20 December 1981 – 19 December 1998
- Constituency: Taipei County

Personal details
- Born: 30 November 1952 Banqiao, Taipei County, Taiwan
- Died: 21 April 2020 (aged 67) Banqiao, New Taipei, Taiwan
- Party: Kuomintang
- Education: Hsing Wu School of Business

Liu Ping-wei (Chinese: 劉炳偉; pinyin: Liú Bǐngwěi; 30 November 1952 – 21 April 2020) was a Taiwanese politician. He was first elected to the Taiwan Provincial Assembly in 1981 and served continuously until 1998. Liu assumed the speakership of the provincial assembly between 1994 and 1998, and sat for a single term in the Legislative Yuan from 1999 to 2002.

== Personal life and education ==
Liu Ping-wei was born in 1952, the eldest son of real estate investor and Banqiao mayor Liu Shun-tien. Liu Ping-wei attended the Hsing Wu School of Business. His family owned the Hai Shan Group, founded by the elder Liu. Liu Ping-wei's three younger brothers were Ping-huang, who worked in real estate, Ping-hua, who was elected to the second Legislative Yuan, and Liu Ping-chung, an administrator at Chunghsing Hospital in Banqiao.

Liu Ping-wei's daughter Liu Mei-fang has served on the New Taipei City Council.

== Political career ==
Liu was a member of the Taiwan Provincial Assembly for four terms from 1981 until 1999. In his third term, Liu served as deputy speaker, and was elected to the speakership in his final term. He won election to the Legislative Yuan in 1998, and served until 2002. In 2000, Liu founded the New Taiwan Policy Research Foundation, an interparty think tank of national legislators, as well as the New Taiwan Political Alliance, for supporters of James Soong. Liu himself had close relationships with Soong and Lien Chan. Liu renewed his Kuomintang membership in January 2001. The party did not nominate Liu for a second term on the Legislative Yuan.

Overseas trips taken by Liu shortly after stepping down as a national legislator twice became subject to investigation. The first was in 2005, as part of a probe into Chen Che-nan and the Kaohsiung MRT foreign workers scandal. The second took place in 2007, during an investigation into prosecutor Shen Ming-yen.

== Death ==
Liu Ping-wei sought treatment for oral cancer at Banqiao Chunghsing Hospital, where he died on 21 April 2020, aged 67.
