= Lee Yuan-chuan =

Taiwanese Politician

Lee Yuan-chuan (Chinese: 李源泉; born 20 May 1944) is a Taiwanese politician.

Lee was a party list member of the Legislative Yuan from 1993 to 1996, and represented the Kuomintang. He subsequently led the Kuomintang's social affairs department, the party's Kaohsiung chapter, and the Taiwan Joint Irrigation Association. Between 2009 and 2016, Lee headed the Taiwan Provincial Consultative Council.
