= Asia Museum of Modern Art =

Museum in Wufeng, Taichung, Taiwan

- 亞洲現代美術館
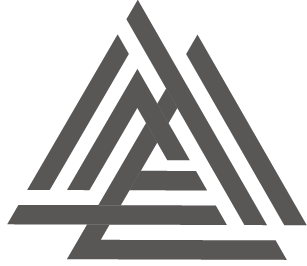

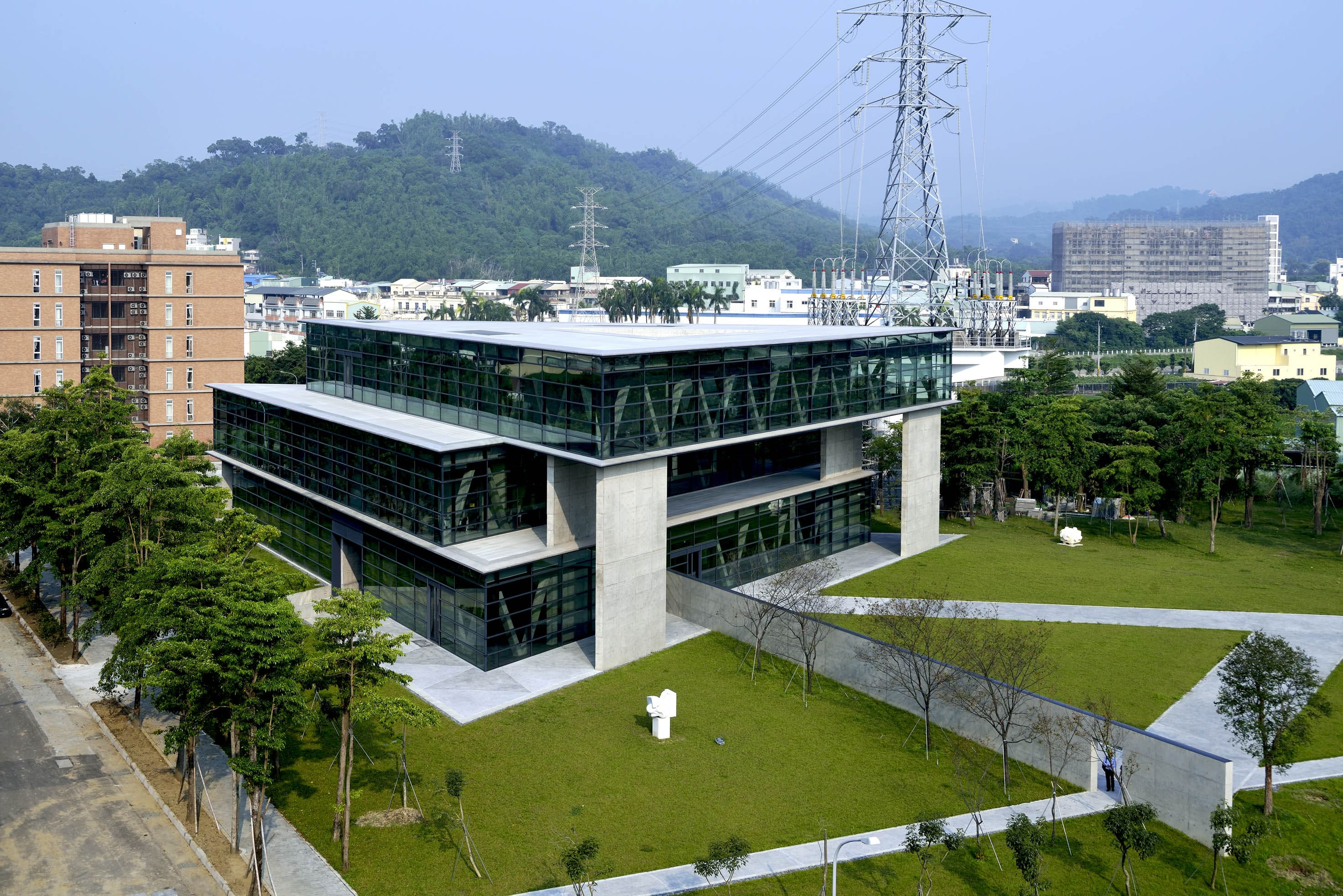
- Established: 24 October 2013; 12 years ago
- Location: Wufeng, Taichung, Taiwan
- Coordinates: 24°02′49.5″N 120°41′17.5″E
- Type: art museum
- Architect: Tadao Ando
- Website: Official website

The Asia Museum of Modern Art (traditional Chinese: 亞洲現代美術館; simplified Chinese: 亚洲现代美术馆; pinyin: Yàzhōu Xiàndài Měishùguǎn; Taiwanese: A-tsiu Hiān-tāi Bí-su̍t-kuán) is an art museum in Wufeng District, Taichung, Taiwan. The museum is located at Asia University.

== History ==
The groundbreaking ceremony for the museum construction was held on 24 January 2011. On 4 September 2013, the museum was officially named the Asia Museum of Modern Art or Asia Modern in short. After years of construction, the soft launch of the museum was held on 21 September 2013. The museum was officially opened on 24 October 2013 in a ceremony attended by President Ma Ying-jeou, Taichung Mayor Jason Hu.

== Architecture ==
The museum was designed by architect Tadao Ando with a triangular shape of structure. The museum interior covers an area of 4,111 m^{2} with additional surrounding grounds measuring 19,840 m^{2}. The museum building consists of three floors, which houses café, shop and lecture hall on the ground floor and art galleries on the upper and top most floor.

== See also ==
- List of museums in Taiwan
