= Taiwan Education Association Building =

Education center in Taiwan

- 台灣教育會館
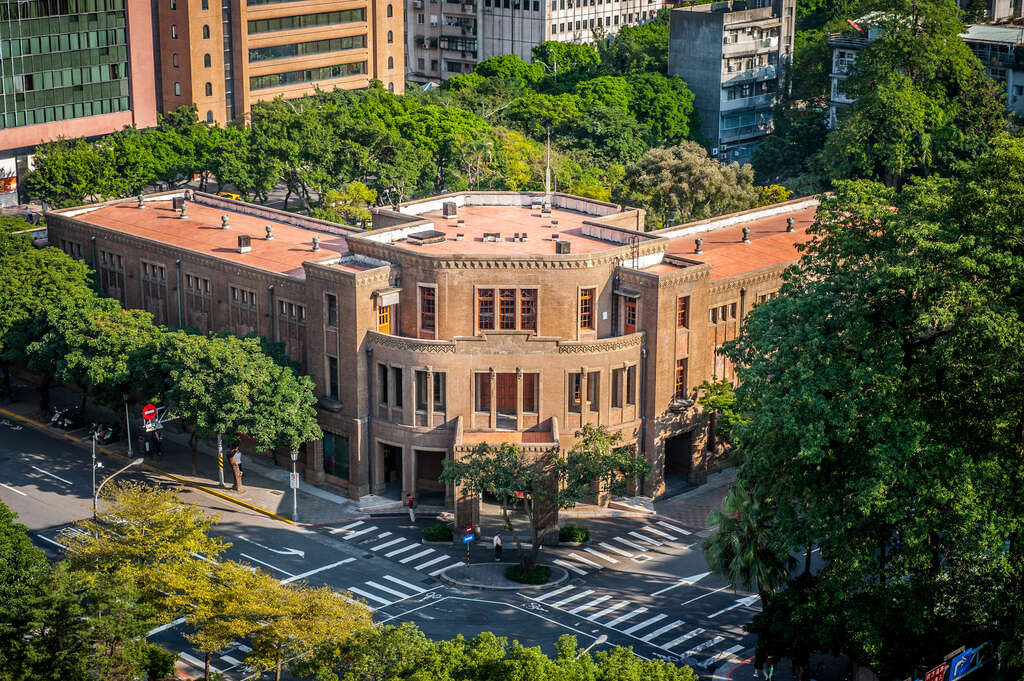
- Original Taiwan Education Association Building facade
- Interactive map of the Taiwan Education Association Building area
- Former names: American Cultural Center 美國文化中心

General information
- Location: Taipei City, Taiwan, No 54, Nanhai Road, Zhongzheng District
- Coordinates: 25°1′53.77″N 121°30′49.88″E
- Completed: 1931

Design and construction
- Architect: Ide Kaoru

The Taiwan Education Association Building (Chinese: 原臺灣教育會館; pinyin: Yuán Táiwān Jiàoyù Huìguǎn) is a building in Zhongzheng District, Taipei, Taiwan.

== History ==
The building was built in 1931 and originally housed exhibits of educational achievements in Taiwan during Japanese colonial rule, and served as a venue for regular gatherings. After the handover of Taiwan from Japan to the Republic of China in 1945, the building was used as the Taiwan Provincial Consultative Council from April 1946 to May 1958. Later, it was rented by the United States Information Service as the American Cultural Center, which moved out when the lease was due.

In 1992, the building was rented by the Scouts of China which is the national Boy Scouts organization in the Republic of China. It now hosts the National 228 Memorial Museum.

== Architecture ==
Its design was directed by Ide Kaoru, the chief of the Japanese colonial government's civil engineering section, and was thus quite similar to that of the Taipei Assembly Hall. Its eclectic modern style includes exterior walls with brown face brick and a parapet with washed terrazzo in a geometrical pattern.
