= Taiwan Provincial Consultative Council =

Former council in the Republic of China

Coordinates: 24.054416045198°N 120.696749312406°E

- 臺灣省諮議會; Táiwān Shěng Zīyìhuì (Mandarin); Thòi-vân Sén Chṳ̂-ngi-fi (Hakka)

Agency overview
- Formed: 1 May 1946 (as Provincial Council); 20 December 1998 (as Provincial Consultative Council)
- Dissolved: 31 December 2018
- Jurisdiction: Taiwan Province
- Agency executive: Cheng Yung-chin, Chairperson
- Website: www.tpa.gov.tw

Taiwan Provincial Consultative Council
- Traditional Chinese: 臺灣省諮議會
- Simplified Chinese: 台湾省咨议会
Transcriptions
Standard Mandarin
- Hanyu Pinyin: Táiwān Shěng Zīyìhuì
- Wade–Giles: T'ai^{2}-wan^{1} Shêng^{3} Tzû^{1}-i^{4}-hui^{4}
Hakka
- Pha̍k-fa-sṳ: Thòi-vân Sén Chṳ̂-ngi-fi
Southern Min
- Hokkien POJ: Tâi-oân Séng Chu-gī-hōe
- Tâi-lô: Tâi-uân Síng Tsu-gī-huē

The Taiwan Provincial Consultative Council (TPCC) was the council of the streamlined Taiwan Province of the Republic of China. In July 2018, all duties of the Taiwan Provincial Government and TPCC were transferred to the National Development Council and other ministries of the Executive Yuan.

== History ==
The body was originally established on 1 May 1946 as the Taiwan Provincial Council (臺灣省參議會). It was reorganized as the Taiwan Provisional Provincial Assembly (臺灣省臨時省議會) in December 1951, and formally reconstituted as the Taiwan Provincial Assembly (臺灣省議會) in June 1959. As all council members were democratically elected, until the 1991 National Assembly election and 1992 legislative election, it was the most recognized democratic legislature in Taiwan.

In 1996, President Lee Teng-hui decided to abolish most of the governmental functions of Taiwan Province. It was restructured as the Taiwan Provincial Consultative Council (臺灣省諮議會) with the streamlining of the Taiwan Provincial Government in 1998.

On 1 July 2018, by a resolution passed during the 3606th meeting of the Executive Yuan, all the remaining duties were transferred to the National Development Council and other ministries of the Executive Yuan. The transformations completed before 31 December 2018. However, the government maintained the position of Chairperson of the Taiwan Provincial Consultative Council to comply with the requirement set by the Additional Articles of the Constitution.

== Council structure ==
Currently, the only official who serves in the council is the Chairperson of Taiwan Provincial Consultative Council.

The consultative council does not have any physical meeting place after all its functionalities were handed to the central government in 2018. Historically, the consultative council was located in Taipei from April 1946 to May 1958, and in Wufeng, Taichung County (now Taichung special municipality and not a part of Taiwan Province) from May 1958 to 2018.

Order	First	Second
Location	Ku-t'ing District, Taipei City (now Zhongzheng, Taipei)	Wufeng, Taichung County (now Wufeng, Taichung)
Date in use	April 1946 to May 1958	May 1958 to December 2018
Photo		
Notes	Currently the heritage site of Taiwan Education Association Building, and the National 228 Memorial Museum	Currently the heritage site of Democratic Times Museum

== Speakers (1946–1998) ==
No.	Name	Took office	Left office	Body
1	Huang Chao-chin	1 May 1946	11 December 1951	Taiwan Provincial Council
1	Huang Chao-chin	11 December 1951	24 June 1959	Taiwan Provisional Provincial Assembly
1	Huang Chao-chin	24 June 1959	1 June 1963	Taiwan Provincial Assembly
2	Hsieh Tung-min	2 June 1963	31 January 1973	Taiwan Provincial Assembly
3	Tsai Hung-wen	1 February 1973	19 December 1981	Taiwan Provincial Assembly
4	Kao Yu-jen	20 December 1981	19 December 1989	Taiwan Provincial Assembly
5	Chien Ming-ching	20 December 1989	19 December 1994	Taiwan Provincial Assembly
6	Liu Ping-wei	20 December 1994	19 December 1998	Taiwan Provincial Assembly

== Chairpersons of the Provincial Consultative Council (1998–2018) ==
- Lin Po-jung (20 December 1998 – 20 May 2000)
- Peng Tien-fu (13 June 2000 – 20 December 2001)
- Fan Chen-tsung (21 December 2001 – 31 January 2002)
- Yu Lin-ya (1 February 2002 – 19 January 2009)
- Lee Yuan-chuan (20 January 2009 – 20 December 2016)
- Cheng Yung-chin (21 December 2016 – 30 June 2018)

== See also ==
- Legislative Yuan
- Urban Council and Regional Council of Hong Kong
