= Lin Jin-zhong =

Taiwanese painter and calligrapher

Lin Jin-zhong (born 1951 in Wufeng, Taichung), with the courtesy name Qinglan, is a Taiwanese painter and calligrapher. Lin obtained the Master's degree from the National University of Tsukuba's Art Research Institute in Japan. He has held various positions at the National Taiwan University of Arts, including professor and chair of the Department of Painting and Calligraphy Art, dean of Fine Art College, and vice president. He is currently an honorary professor at the National Taiwan University of Arts and serves as an adjunct professor in the Department of Painting and Calligraphy Art.

== Biography ==
Lin Jin-zhong was born in Wufeng District|Wufeng, Taichung, in 1951. In 1967, he attended Chiayi Normal School, where he received guidance from professors Zhen Ming and Chen Ding-qi, learning Chinese painting and calligraphy. After graduating from Chiayi Normal School with a degree in Elementary Education in 1970, he taught at Kali Elementary School in Wuri Township, Taichung County, for three years.

From 1973 to 1976, he studied art at the National Taiwan College of Arts, and from 1981 to 1983, he studied at the Department of Fine Arts at the Chinese Culture University. In 1985, he went to Japan, researching calligraphy of the early Qin Dynasty and Buddhist art. He developed a style of seal script called "Chu Silk Manuscript". In 1989, he obtained a master's degree in art at the University of Tsukuba in Japan.

From 1989 to 1996, he taught as a full-time lecturer and associate professor at the Department of Arts and Crafts at the Oriental Institute of Technology in Taiwan. Subsequently, he served as a full-time professor and dean of research and development, director of the second term (years 2005–2008) and third term (years 2008–2010) of the Department of Painting and Calligraphy Art, director of the Graduate School of the Calligraphy and Painting Group of Plastic Art, dean of the Fine Art College in 2010, and vice president of the National Taiwan University of Arts in 2015.

== Art style ==
Lin's ink paintings are mostly inspired by daily life scenes. His portrayal of water buffaloes is known for its vivid postures. He integrates unearthed bamboo and silk manuscripts of the Warring States and the Qin and Chu Dynasties into his calligraphy.

=== Awards ===
He has received:

- Dr. Sun Yat-sen Literature and Art Award
- Chung Hsing Literature and Art Award
- Literature and Golden Lion Literature and Art Award.
