= Liu Ping-hua =

Taiwanese politician

Liu Ping-hua (Chinese: 劉炳華; born 6 October 1955) is a Taiwanese politician who served on the Legislative Yuan from 1993 to 1996, as a member of the Kuomintang representing Taipei County. His elder brother Liu Ping-wei has also served on the Legislative Yuan.
