= Chaoyang University of Technology =

University in Taichung, Taiwan

Coordinates: 24°04′07″N 120°42′52″E

- 朝陽科技大學
- Motto: 勤學、敦品、力行(Pe̍h-ōe-jī: Khîn-ha̍k, Tun-phín, Le̍k-hêng)
- Motto in English: Diligence, Character and Action
- Type: Private, Technical University
- Established: 14 April 1994
- President: Tao-ming Cheng, Ph.D.
- Faculty: 1,058
- Administrative staff: 185
- Students: 13,796
- Location: Wufeng, Taichung, Taiwan
- Campus: Suburban, 164.1 acres (0.6643 km^{2})
- Website: www.cyut.edu.tw

Chaoyang University of Technology
- Traditional Chinese: 朝陽科技大學
Transcriptions
Standard Mandarin
- Hanyu Pinyin: Cháoyáng kējìdàxué
Southern Min
- Hokkien POJ: Tiâu-iông Kho-ki Tāi-ha̍k

Chaoyang University of Technology (CYUT) (Chinese: 朝陽科技大學; Pe̍h-ōe-jī: Tiâu-iông Kho-ki Tāi-ha̍k) is a university in Wufeng District, Taichung, Taiwan. Founded in 1994, originally named Chaoyang Institute of Technology, and granted university status in 1997.

Currently, the university comprises five colleges and 23 departments, which offers 23 master's programs and 5 doctoral programs. There are 18,000 students currently enrolled, they are around 1,800, and faculty and staff total about 1,000. It was ranked 1201–1400 by QS in 2024.

== List of presidents ==
NAME	TENURE OF OFFICE
Dr. Tang-Kuang Tseng	1994–2002
Dr. Jun-Chung Yang	2002–2005
Dr. Chung-jen Chin	2005–2016
Dr. Tao-ming Cheng	2016–present

== History ==
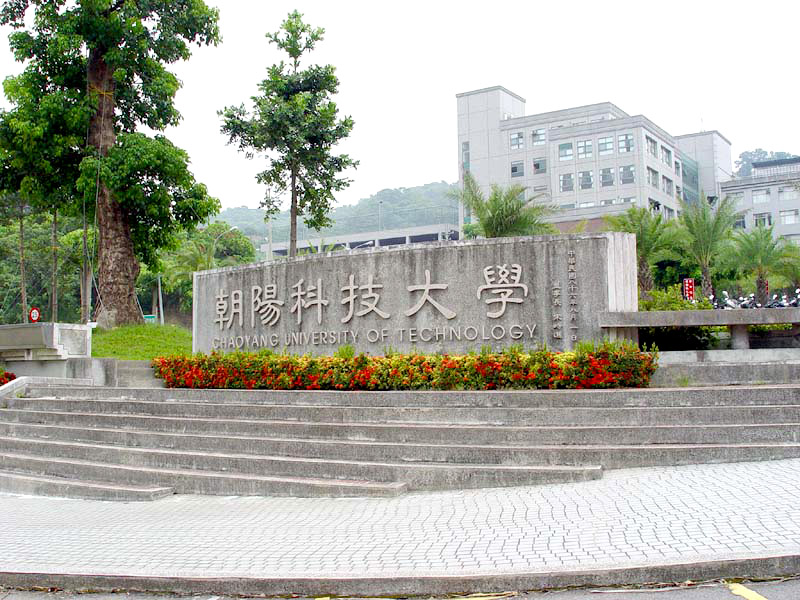
Chaoyang University of Technology

Chaoyang University of Technology was founded in 1994 through the generosity of Dr. Tien-sheng Yang, the President of the Ever Fortune Group, a major R.O.C.'s conglomerate. He founded it in memory of his parents, and in return for the support he received throughout the years from the people and communities of central Taiwan. In 1988, he chose a site in Wufeng Township of Taichung County (now part of Taichung City), and after six years of preparation, on April 14, 1994, it received permission from the Ministry of Education to begin accepting students as Chaoyang Institute of Technology.

In its first year, Chaoyang Institute of Technology had eight departments and over 900 students. On August 1, 1997, Chaoyang Institute of Technology was designated by the Ministry of Education as a University of Technology, the school name was officially changed to Chaoyang University of Technology. It was Taiwan's first private University of Technology.

In addition to its new designation, Chaoyang University of Technology has continued to expand, and today five colleges, twenty-two graduate schools, including five doctoral programs, twenty-two master's degree programs and twenty-two departments, as well as its Evening Division, General Education Center, Continuing Education Center, Office of Research and Development, Business Incubation Center, and the College of Enterprise Innovation.

== Special Activities ==
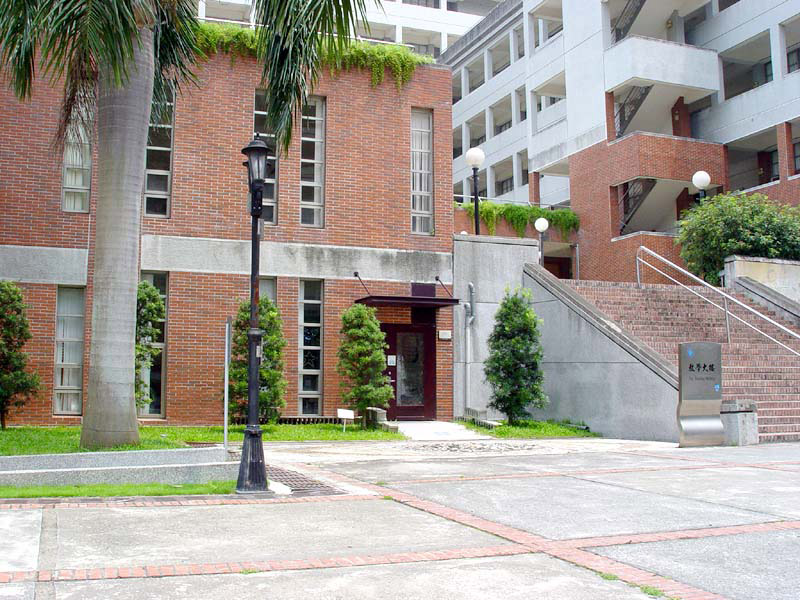
The Teaching Building (T1) of CYUT

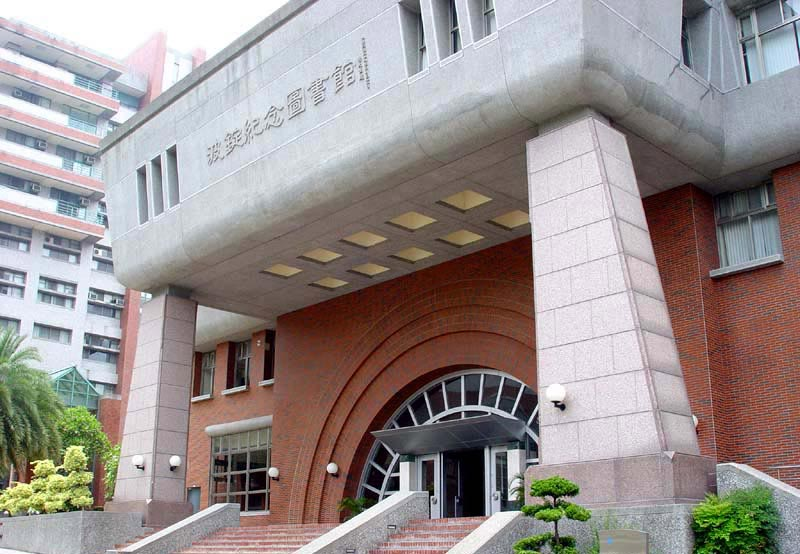
CYUT Library

=== Labor education ===
The main purpose of labor lducation of it is to help the students to become self-motivated, diligent, loving their schools, and to foster teamwork mentality. In addition, the course is to encourage students to contribute to the outside of the school in order or strengthen a positive relationship between the school and the community.

Starting 2020, labor education is a mandetory course for all students worth 1 credit per school term. Labor education is separated into "Basic Labor Education" and "Group Labor Education."

For basic labor education, students to maintain the cleanliness of the public space on campus, which are assigned randomly by organizing teachers. In addition, students are able to choose from a few predetermined timeslots in order to best fit into their existing schedule.

For group labor education, organizing teachers will lead student groups to spend two hours in maintaining the cleanliness and tidiness of the grassland on campus through group interaction and the advisor's participation. In addition, to making the campus cleaner, it can help intensify interrelations in class. Moreover, to have the community service scheme that allows students to walk out of campus and go into the community where they live to carry to clean and to offer help to minorities. The contents of campus part-time job include word processing, environmental maintenance, and traffic services.

== Colleges and Departments ==
- The General Education Center
- College of Management
  - Ph.D. Program in Strategic Development of Taiwan's Industry
  - Master Program in Senior Executive Master of Business Administration
  - Department and Graduate Institute of Finance
  - Department and Graduate Institute of Business Administration
  - Department and Graduate Institute of Insurance
  - Department and Graduate Institute of Accounting
  - Department and Graduate Institute of Leisure Service Management
  - Department of Marketing and Logistics Management
  - Department of Golden-Ager Industry Management
- College of Science and Engineering
  - Department and Graduate Institute of Construction Engineering
  - Department and Graduate Institute of Industrial Engineering and Management
  - Department and Graduate Institute of Applied Chemistry (Master and Ph.D. Program in Biochemical Technology)
  - Department and Graduate Institute of Environmental Engineering and Management
- The Center of Teacher Education
- College of Design
  - Department and Graduate Institute of Architecture (Master and Ph.D. Program in Architecture and Urban Design)
  - Department and Graduate Institute of Visual Communication Design
  - Department and Graduate Institute of Industrial Design
  - Department and Graduate Institute of Landscape and Urban Design
- College of Humanities and Social Sciences
  - Department of Communication Arts
  - Department and Graduate Institute of Applied English
  - Department and Graduate Institute of Early Childhood Development and Education
  - Department and Graduate Institute of Social Work
- College of Informatics
  - Department, Graduate Institute and Doctoral Program of Information Management
  - Department and Graduate Institute of Computer Science and Information Engineering
  - Department and Graduate Institute of Information and Communication Engineering

== Notable alumni ==
- Lin Ming-chen, Magistrate of Nantou County

== See also ==
- List of universities in Taiwan
- Poding Memorial Library
