= Wufeng District =

District in Taichung, Taiwan

Coordinates: 24°4′N 120°42′E

Wufeng 霧峰區 Wufong
- District
- Wufeng District
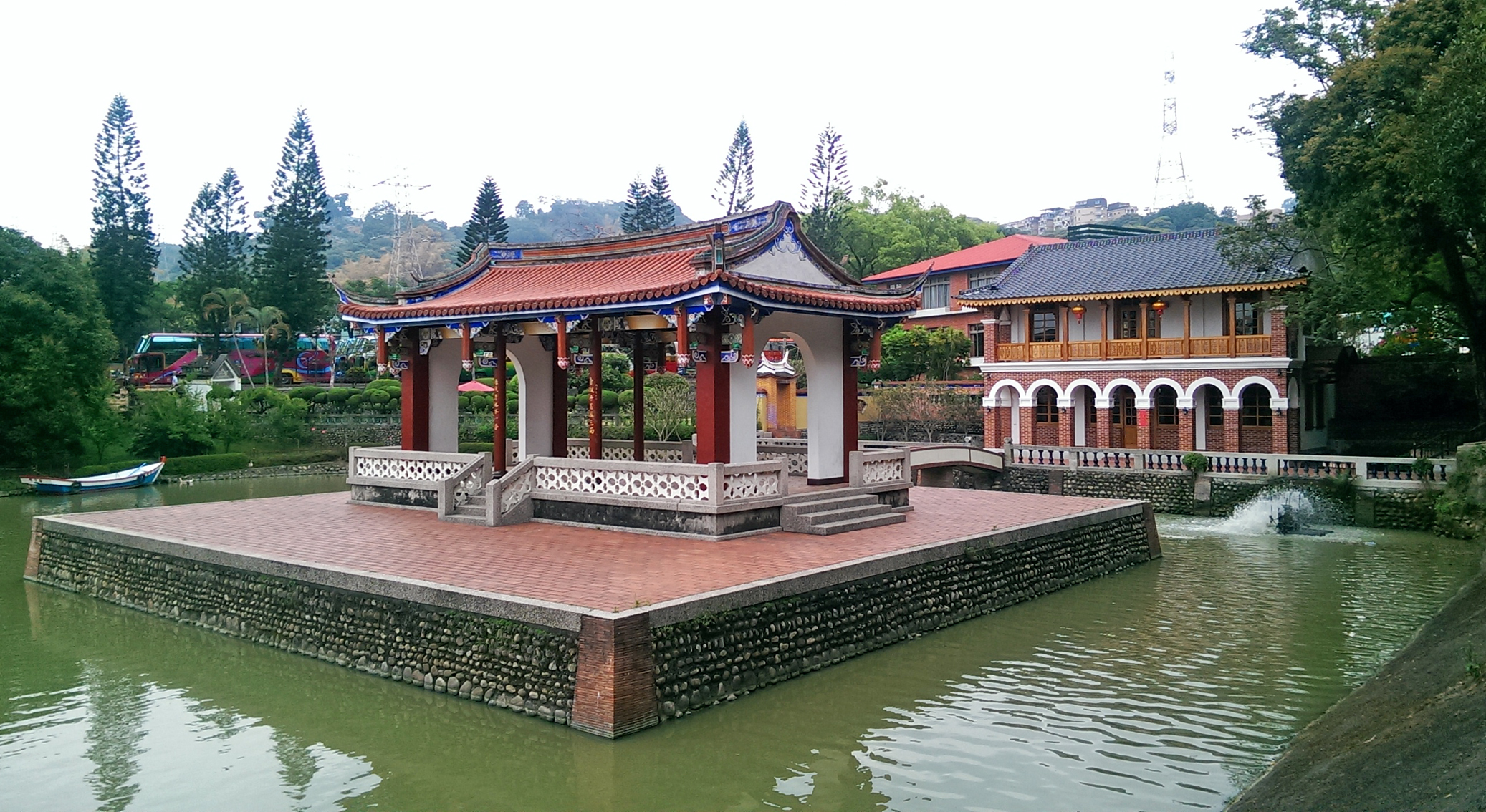
- The Lin Family Garden in Wufeng District

- Wufeng District in Taichung City
- Location: Taichung, Taiwan

Area
  - Total: 98 km^{2} (38 sq mi)

Population (March 2023)
  - Total: 64,080
  - Density: 650/km^{2} (1,700/sq mi)
- Website: www.wufeng.taichung.gov.tw (in Chinese)

Wufeng District (Chinese: 霧峰區; Pe̍h-ōe-jī: Bū-hong-khu) is a suburban district in southern Taichung, Taiwan. It is the location of Taiwan Provincial Consultative Council.

Wufeng is a mainly agricultural town. It was heavily damaged by the Jiji earthquake on 21 September 1999, which caused around 100 deaths in the town. The 921 Earthquake Museum of Taiwan, which commemorates the giant quake, is built at what was formerly Guangfu Junior High School, which was destroyed when part of the school was uplifted by the Chelungpu Fault during the quake.

The two major geographical features of this town are the Wu Xi (Wu Stream), which forms the town's southern border, and Xiangbi Shan (Elephant Trunk Mountain), which lies in the eastern part of the township.

== History ==
The name Wufeng was formerly called Atabu (Chinese: 阿罩霧; Pe̍h-ōe-jī: A-tà-bū), which was an Arikun tribe.

== Administrative divisions ==
Wufeng District Office

Tonglin, Jifeng, Jiayin, Benxiang, Zhongzheng, Jinrong, Laiyuan, Bentang, Beiliu, Nanliu, Side, Wufu, Dingtai, Beishi, Nanshi, Wanfeng, Jiuzheng, Kengkou, Fenggu Liugu Village.

== Geography ==
- Area: 98.08 km^{2}
- Population: 64,094 people (February 2023)

== Education ==
- Asia University
- Chaoyang University of Technology

== Government institutions ==
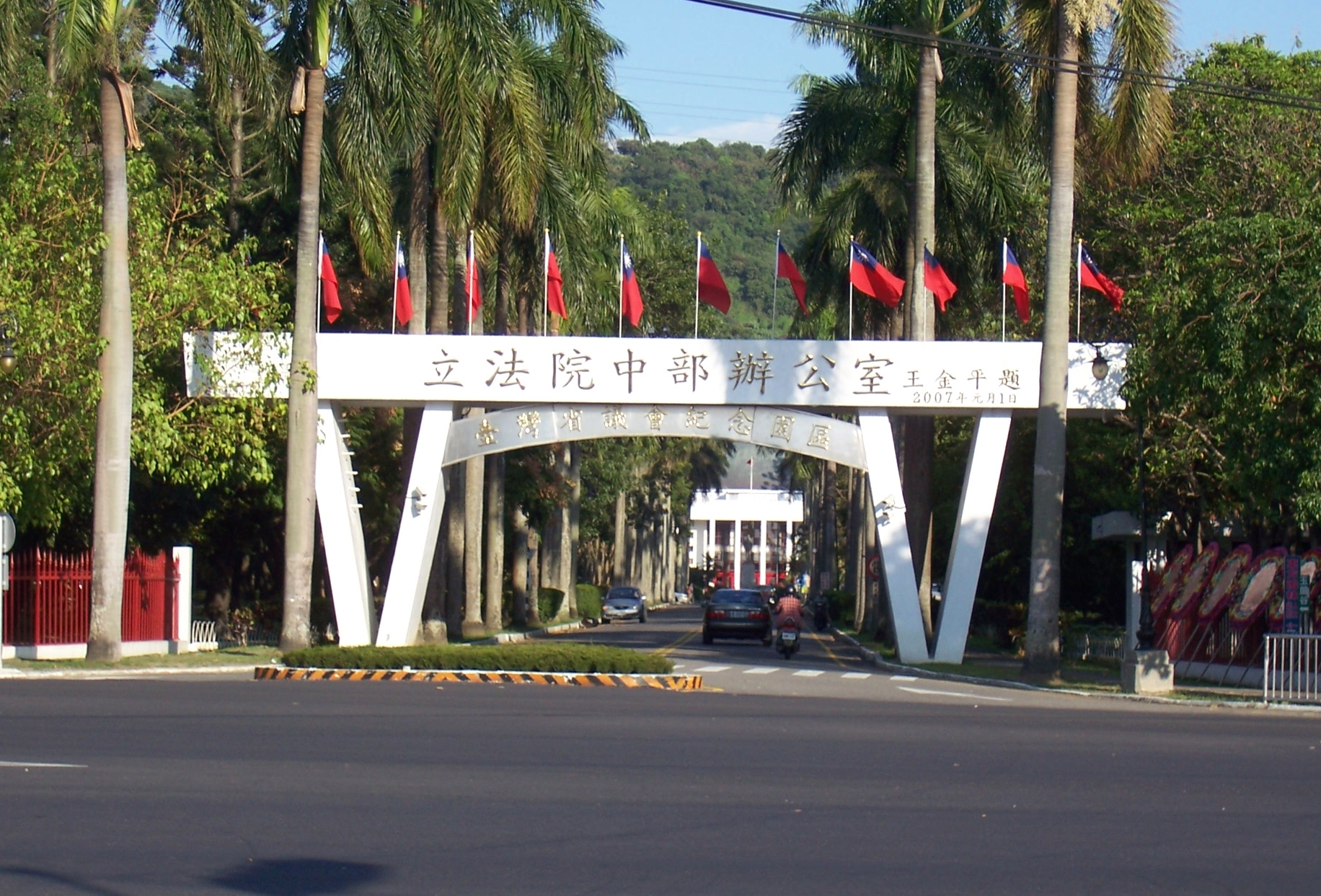
The Legislative Yuan's central region office in the former Taiwan Provincial Council

- Bureau of Cultural Heritage
- K-12 Education Administration
- National Taiwan Symphony Orchestra

== Tourist attractions ==
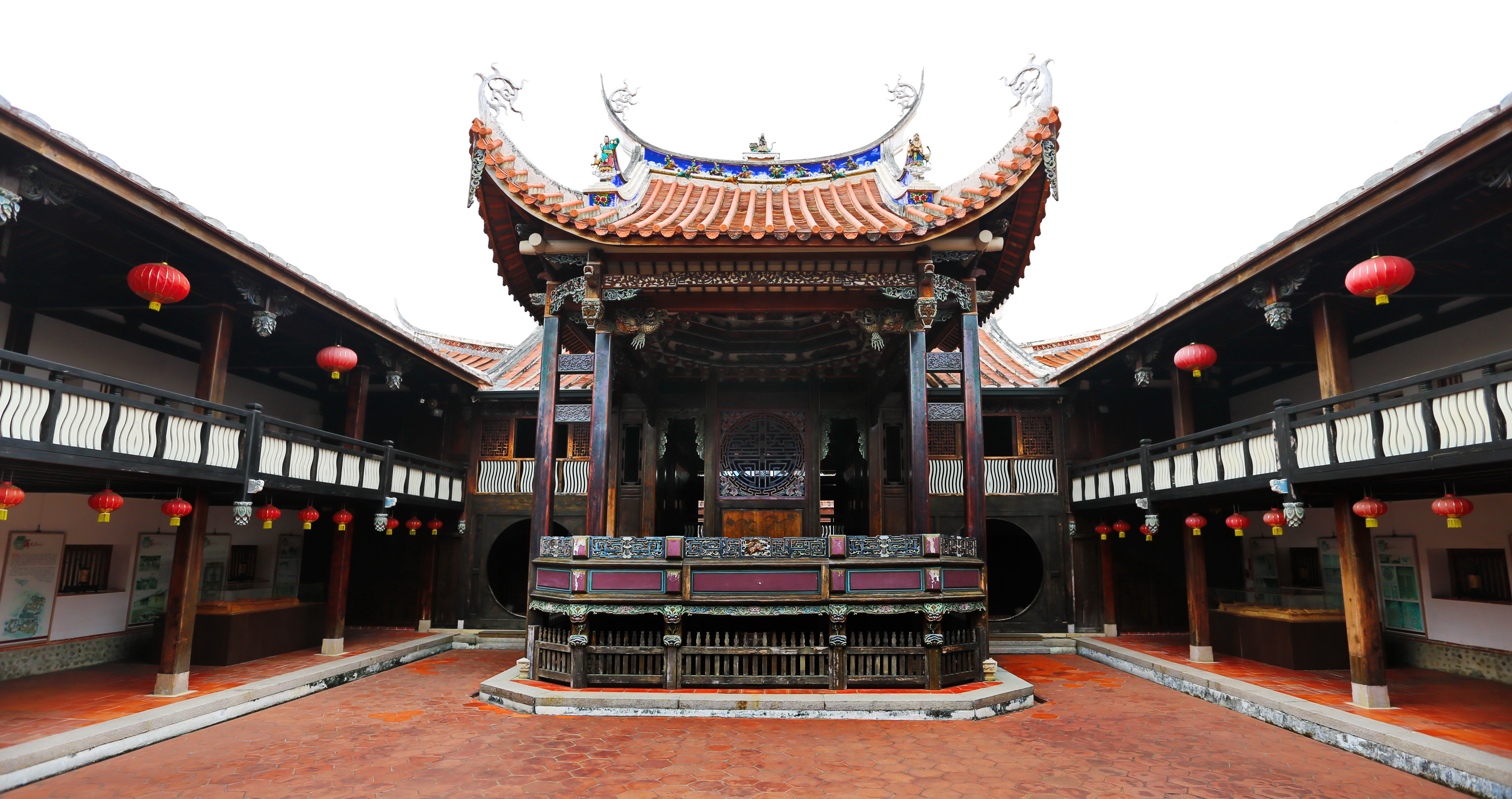
Wufeng Lin Family Garden

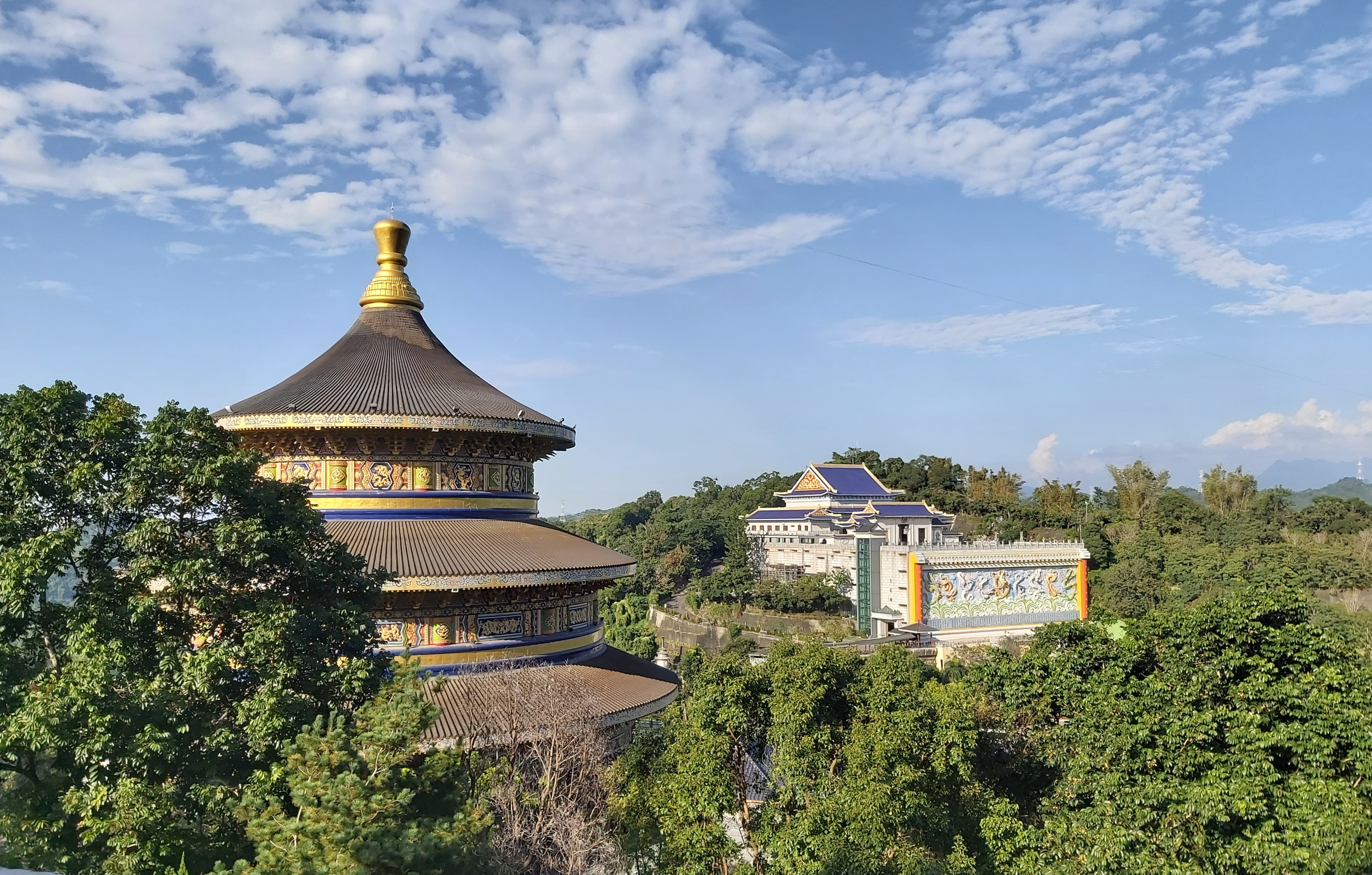
Jin Ling Shan

- 921 Earthquake Museum of Taiwan
- Asia Museum of Modern Art
- Assembly Affairs Museum, The Legislative Yuan
- Democratic Times Museum
- Lin Hsien-tang Residence Museum
- National Taiwan Symphony Orchestra
- Wufeng Lin Family Mansion and Garden
- Jin Ling Shan
- Jiujiu Feng (Ninety-nine peaks)
- Memorial Park of the Taiwan Provincial Council
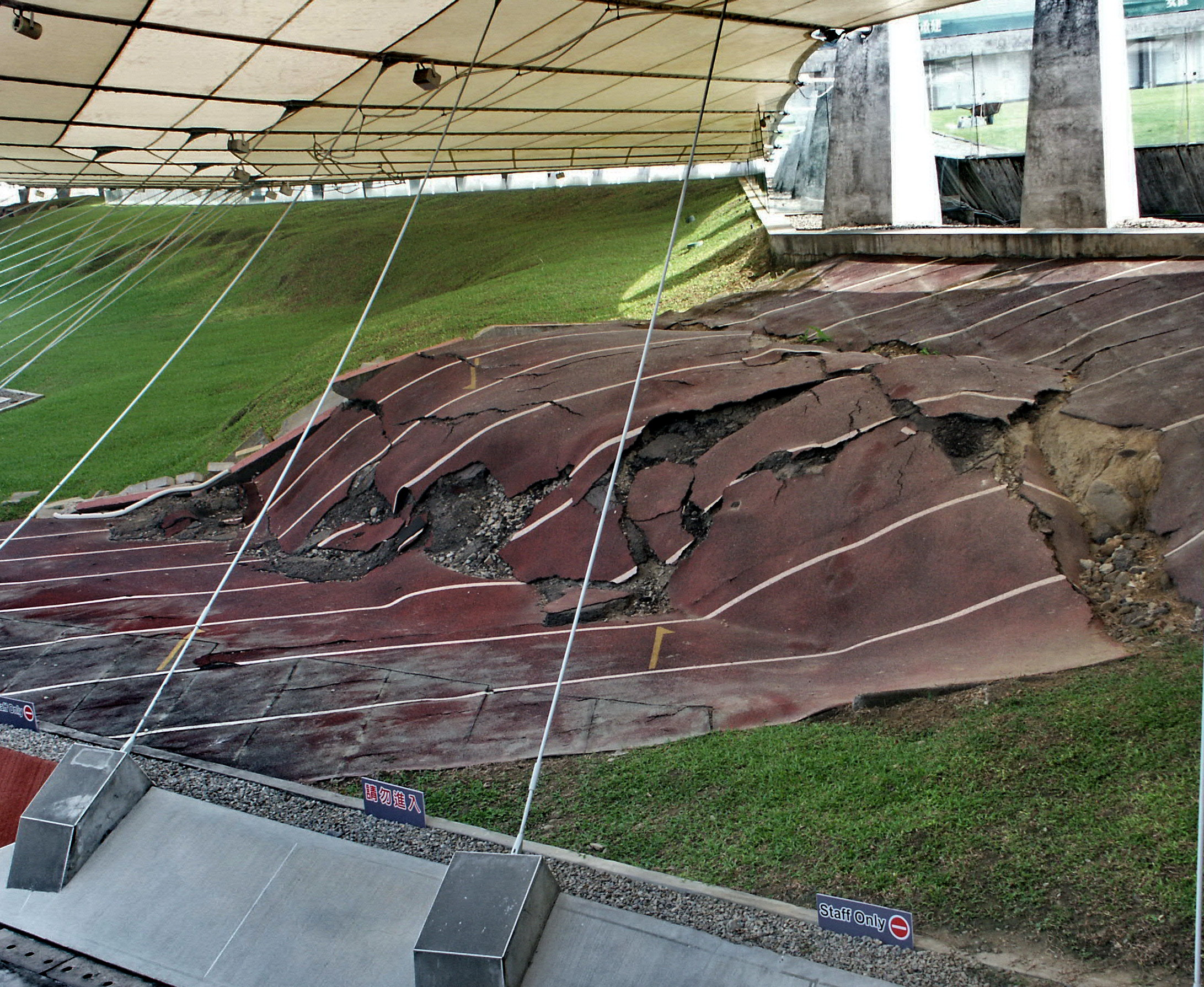
- 921 Earthquake Museum of Taiwan
  Tong-Lin Ecological Park
- Taiwan Mushroom Museum

== Transportation ==
=== Roads ===
==== Freeway ====
National Freeway No.3 Wufeng Interchange

National Freeway No.6 Jiujeng Interchange

==== Provincial Way ====
Provincial Highway 3

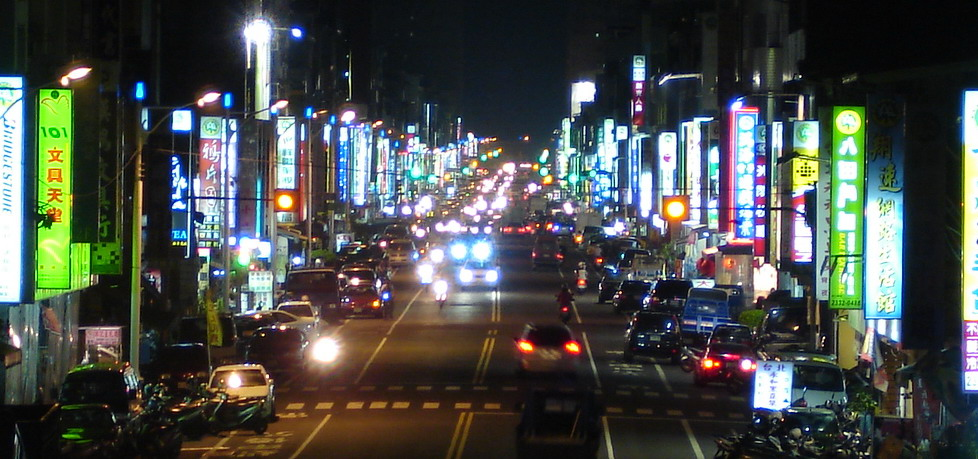
Zhongzheng Road, Downtown Wufeng (中正路)

Provincial Highway 63 (Zhongtou Highway)

=== Buses ===
17

50 (rides from 921 Earthquake Museum to Beitun District)

53 (rides to Wenxin Road, Nantun District)

59

107 (rides to Nantun District)

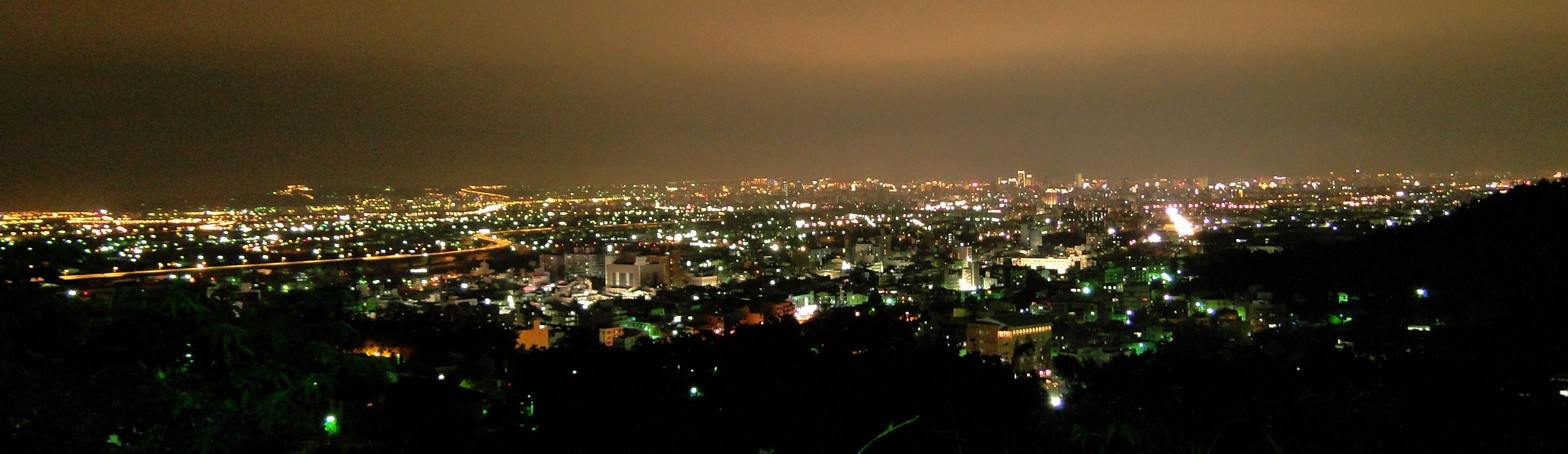
Taichung Metropolitan night view

108 (rides from Beitun District to Tsaotun, Nantou)

131

132

151 (rides to High Speed Rail Taichung Station)

201 (rides from Asia University to North District)

281

282

== Notable natives ==
- Tang Yao-ming, Minister of National Defense (2002–2004)
- Lin Jin-zhong, calligraphy artist (b. 1951)

== See also ==
- Taichung
