= Institute of Engineering Education Taiwan =

The Institute of Engineering Education Taiwan (Chinese: 中華工程教育學會; literally Chinese Institute of Engineering Education) is a non-profit, non-governmental; organization committed to accreditation of engineering and technology education programs in Taiwan.

== See also ==
- Education in Taiwan
