= Museum of National Yang Ming Chiao Tung University =

Museum in East, Hsinchu City, Taiwan

- 交大發展館
- Established: 2004
- Location: East, Hsinchu City, Taiwan
- Coordinates: 24°47′15″N 120°59′54″E
- Type: museum
- Owner: National Yang Ming Chiao Tung University
- Website: Official website

The Museum of National Yang Ming Chiao Tung University (traditional Chinese: 交大發展館; simplified Chinese: 交大发展馆; pinyin: Jiāodà Fāzhǎnguǎn) is a museum about the history of the National Yang Ming Chiao Tung University in East District, Hsinchu City, Taiwan. The museum is located at the National Chiao Tung University.

== History ==
The museum was established in 2004.

== Architecture ==
The museum has the following galleries:

- Gallery of University Presidents
- Chu-Ming Memorial Room
- University History Area
- The Campus
- Semiconductor Exhibition Area
- Computer Exhibition Area
- Special Exhibition Area

== Exhibitions ==
There are over 4,000 photos of staffs and students, alumni, events of the school's history, scenes of the campuses and activities held in the university.

== See also ==
- List of museums in Taiwan
- National Chiao Tung University
