= Ray-Hua Horng =

Taiwanese electrical engineer

- Citizenship: Taiwanese

Academic background
- Education: National Cheng Kung University (BS); National Sun Yat-Sen University (PhD)

Academic work
- Discipline: Electrical engineer
- Sub-discipline: Optoelectronics
- Institutions: Dayeh University; National Chung Hsing University; National Yang Ming Chiao Tung University

Ray-Hua Horng (Chinese: 洪瑞華) is a Taiwanese electrical engineer, and a University Chair Professor in the Institute of Electronics at National Yang Ming Chiao Tung University, where she directs the Advanced Semiconductor Technologies and Devices Lab. Her research concerns optoelectronics including light-emitting diodes, lasers, solar cells, and flexible electronics, and the fabrication of optoelectronic devices using metalorganic vapour-phase epitaxy.

== Education and career ==
Horng studied electrical engineering at National Cheng Kung University, receiving a bachelor's degree in 1987. She continued her studies at National Sun Yat-sen University, where she completed her Ph.D. in 1993.

After she completed her Ph.D. she joined the telecommunications laboratory of the Taiwanese Ministry of Transportation and Communications, but later in the same year took a faculty position as associate professor at Dayeh University. In 1998 she moved to National Chung Hsing University as a full professor in its Graduate Institute of Precision Engineering. At National Chung Hsing University, she was affiliated with the Department of Electro-Optical Engineering from 2009 to 2011, and dean of the School of Innovation and Industry Liaison from 2011 to 2015. She was named University Distinguished Professor in 2012.

She moved to the Institute of Electrical Engineering of National Chiao Tung University in 2016, and chaired its Department of Electrical Engineering from 2018 to 2021. In 2021 National Chiao Tung University merged with another university to form National Yang Ming Chiao Tung University, and she has been University Chair Professor in its Institute of Electronics since 2022.

She is president of The Society of Taiwan Women in Science and Technology.

== Recognition ==
Horng was named as a Fellow of the Australian Institute of Energy in 2012, of the British Institution of Engineering and Technology in 2013, and of SPIE, the Society of Photo-Optical Instrumentation Engineers, in 2014. In 2015 she was elected as an IEEE Fellow, "for contributions to high brightness light emitting diodes". Optica named her as a Fellow in 2016, "for contributions to Green Photonics, and in particular for developing high brightness Light Emitting Diodes and high efficiency Solar Cells". She became a Fellow of the Institute of Physics in 2020, a Fellow of the Chinese Institute of Engineers in 2022, and a Fellow of the Chinese Institute of Electrical Engineering and the Taiwan Vacuum Society in 2023.
