= Meichu Game =

The Meichu Game (simplified Chinese: 梅竹赛; traditional Chinese: 梅竹賽; pinyin: Méizhúsài; lit. 'Plum-Bamboo Tournament') is an annual sports competition in March between National Tsing Hua University (NTHU) and National Yang Ming Chiao Tung University (Merger of National Yang Ming University and National Chiao Tung University) of Taiwan. Both schools are located in Hsinchu City, Taiwan. The competition was first held in 1969, although an unofficial tournament had been held in 1966.

梅 (plum-tree) stands for NTHU and 竹 (bamboo) for NYCU. The symbolic names are taken from the founders of both universities, Mei Yi-chi of NTHU and Ling Chu-ming of NCTU, and they further represent pride and purity (plum) as well as rich and everlasting heritage (bamboo). During the Tournament, undergraduate students from each school are competing with those who are from the other with such sports and games as soccer, tennis, chess, etc. The Tournament is held during a week and is accompanied by attractions like concerts, barbecue and parades.

In 2011, NCTU won in badminton, baseball, chess, women's basketball and men's and women's volleyball, whereas NTHU won in table tennis, tennis, men's basketball and bridge, so that NCTU were overall winners.

== Previous Results ==
Year	Winning School	Score	Chess	Male Basketball	Female Basketball	Male Volleyball	Female Volleyball	Soccer	Table Tennis	Badminton	Baseball	Relay	Bridge	Debate	English Speech	Tennis	Tug-of-War	"Children Games"	Chinese Speech
1969	NTHU	7:4	NTHU	NTHU	NTHU	NTHU		NCTU	NTHU		NTHU		NCTU			NCTU			NTHU
1970	NCTU	10:4	NCTU	NTHU		NTHU		NCTU	NCTU	NCTU	NCTU	NTHU	NCTU	NCTU	NCTU	NCTU	NCTU		NTHU
1971	NTHU	7:2	NCTU	NTHU		NTHU			NTHU	NCTU	NTHU	NTHU		NTHU					NTHU
1972	NTHU	3:1										NTHU		NTHU	NCTU		NTHU		
1973	NCTU	6:5	NTHU	NTHU		NTHU		NCTU			NTHU	NCTU	NCTU	NCTU	NCTU		NTHU	NCTU	
1974	NTHU	7:2	NTHU	NTHU	NTHU	NTHU					NCTU	NCTU	NTHU		NTHU		NTHU		
1975	NCTU	8:3	NCTU	NTHU		NCTU		NCTU			NCTU	NTHU	NTHU	NCTU	NCTU		NCTU	NCTU	
1976	Tied	5:5	NCTU	NTHU		NTHU		NCTU			NCTU	NCTU	NTHU	NTHU	NCTU		NTHU		
1977	NCTU	10:1	NCTU	NCTU		NTHU		NCTU			NCTU	NCTU	NCTU	NCTU	NCTU		NCTU	NCTU	
1978	NCTU	7:4	NCTU	NCTU		NCTU		NCTU			NTHU	NTHU	NCTU	NTHU	NCTU		NTHU	NCTU	
1979	NTHU	9:2	NTHU	NTHU		NTHU		NCTU			NCTU	NTHU	NTHU	NTHU	NTHU		NTHU	NTHU	
1980	Cancelled																		
1981	NCTU	6:5	NTHU	NTHU		NCTU		NTHU			NTHU	NTHU	NCTU	NCTU	NCTU	NCTU		NCTU	
1982	NTHU	8:3	NTHU	NTHU		NCTU		NTHU			NTHU	NTHU	NTHU	NCTU	NTHU		NTHU	NCTU	
1983	NCTU	10:1	NCTU	NCTU		NCTU		NCTU			NCTU	NCTU	NCTU	NCTU	NCTU		NTHU	NCTU	
1984	Cancelled																		
1985	Cancelled																		
1986	Cancelled																		
1987	NCTU	6:5	NCTU	NTHU	NTHU	NCTU	NCTU	NTHU	NCTU	NCTU			NTHU	NTHU		NCTU			
1988	NCTU	8:5	NCTU	NCTU	NTHU	NCTU	NTHU	NTHU	NCTU	NTHU	NTHU		NCTU	NCTU	NCTU	NCTU			
1989	NCTU	6:5	NCTU	NTHU	NCTU	NCTU	NTHU		NCTU	NTHU	NCTU		NTHU	NTHU		NCTU			
1990	NTHU	8:3	NCTU	NTHU	NTHU	NTHU	NTHU	NTHU	NCTU	NTHU			NTHU	NCTU		NTHU			
1991	NTHU	8:4	NTHU	NCTU	NTHU	NTHU	NCTU	NTHU	NCTU	NTHU	NTHU		NTHU	NCTU		NTHU			
1992	Tied	5:5	NCTU	NCTU	NCTU	NCTU	NTHU	NTHU	NCTU	NTHU			NTHU			NTHU			
1993	Cancelled																		
1994	Cancelled																		
1995	NTHU	6:5	NTHU	NTHU	NCTU	NCTU	NTHU	NCTU	NTHU	NCTU	NTHU		NCTU			NTHU			
1996	Tied	5:5	NCTU	NTHU	NCTU	NCTU	NTHU	Tied	NTHU	NCTU	NTHU		NTHU			NCTU			
1997	NTHU	7:3	NCTU	NTHU	NCTU	NTHU	NTHU	Tied	NTHU	NTHU	NTHU		NTHU			NCTU			
1998	NTHU	7:4	NCTU	NTHU	NCTU	NTHU	NTHU	NCTU	NTHU	NTHU	NTHU		NTHU			NCTU			
1999	NCTU	6:5	NCTU	NTHU	NCTU	NTHU	NTHU	NCTU	NCTU	NTHU	NCTU		NCTU			NTHU			
2000	Cancelled																		
2001	NTHU	7:4	NCTU	NCTU	NTHU	NTHU	NTHU	NTHU	NTHU	NCTU	NTHU		NCTU			NTHU			
2002	NCTU	8:2	NCTU	NCTU	NCTU	NTHU	NTHU	Tied	NCTU	NCTU	NCTU		NCTU			NCTU			
2003	NCTU	6:4	NTHU	NCTU	NCTU	NTHU	NTHU	Tied	NCTU	NCTU	NTHU		NCTU			NCTU			
2004	NCTU	7:4	NCTU	NTHU	NTHU	NCTU	NTHU	NCTU	NCTU	NCTU	NTHU		NCTU			NCTU			
2005	NCTU	6:5	NCTU	NTHU	NTHU	NCTU	NCTU	NTHU	NTHU	NCTU	NCTU		NCTU			NTHU			
2006	NCTU	7:3	NTHU	NTHU	NCTU	NTHU	NCTU	NTHU	NCTU	NCTU	NCTU		NCTU			NCTU			
2007	Cancelled																		
