= National Chiao Tung University =

University in Hsinchu, Taiwan

- 國立交通大學
- Former names: Nanyang Public School (南洋公學)
- Motto: 知新致遠 崇實篤行
- Motto in English: Learn New Knowledge and Reach Far; Honor the Truth and Work Hard
- Type: Public
- Active: 1896–2021
- Affiliations: University System of Taiwan, Washington University in St. Louis McDonnell International Scholars Academy, UAiTED
- Endowment: NTD 5,811,217,691.00
- President: Chen Hsin-hong (acting)
- Faculty: 736
- Undergraduates: 5,248
- Postgraduates: 7,952
- Location: 1001 University Road, Hsinchu, Taiwan 300, Hsinchu City, Taiwan; 24.795861°N 120.9847659°E
- Campus: Suburban
- Language: Chinese and English
- Mascot: Bamboo fox
- Website: nctu.edu.tw

Chinese name
- Simplified Chinese: 国立交通大学
- Traditional Chinese: 國立交通大學
- Literal meaning: National Communications University
Transcriptions
Standard Mandarin
- Hanyu Pinyin: Guólì Jiāotōng Dàxué
Southern Min
- Hokkien POJ: Kok-li̍p-Kau-thong-tāi-ha̍k

National Chiao Tung University (NCTU) was a public research university in Hsinchu, Taiwan. Established in 1896 as Nanyang Public School by an imperial edict of the Guangxu Emperor, it was one of China's leading universities. After the Chinese Civil War, NCTU was re-established by former Chiao Tung University faculty and alumni in Taiwan in 1958.

NCTU was selected by Taiwan's Ministry of Educations as one of the seven national universities focused on research in 2002. It was subsequently chosen to pursue all-around excellence with "versatile international competitiveness to continuously strengthen international academic influence and visibility".

NCTU was merged with National Yang-Ming University into the newly formed National Yang Ming Chiao Tung University on February 1, 2021.

== History ==
=== Qing dynasty ===
National Chiao Tung University was founded in Xujiahui, the suburbs of Shanghai in 1896, sixteen years before the birth of the Republic of China, at the suggestion of Sheng Xuanhuai, Minister of Foreign Affairs of the Qing dynasty. The university was first named Nanyang College. It was established to meet the need to introduce western civilization into China. The college focused only on politics, law, and translations of western books. In the later years of the Qing dynasty, the college was renamed the Vocational College of Higher Education and was governed by the Ministry of Post and Transportation. By including new vocational programs, such as business, electrical engineering, shipping management, and railway management, the college played a major role in science and engineering education in modern China.

The Ministry of Post and Transportation in the Qing dynasty expanded the college by developing three other campuses – the Imperial Railway College in Tang-Shan (established in 1896), the Railway Management College in Peiping (1910), and the Merchant Marine College in Wu-Sun (1911).

=== Republic of China ===
After the founding of the Republic of China in 1912, the four campuses of the college were reorganized and governed by the Ministry of Transportation, which evolved from the original Qing dynasty Ministry of Post and Transportation. The names of the Vocational College of Higher Education, the Railway College, and the Railway Management College were changed respectively to the Shanghai Industrial College, the Tang-Shan Industrial College, and the College of Management in Railway, Post and Telecommunications. In 1921, the Ministry of Transportation united these three campuses under a single name: Chiao Tung University. The university reorganized its administrative systems, enlarged its facilities, and formed a new board of trustees. Later on, these three campuses were separated and reunited several times and their names were changed repeatedly because of political turmoil.

In 1926 the Shanghai campus established its Institute of Industry, which was devoted to telecommunication research. At the end of the Northern Expedition in 1928, the university resumed the name of Chiao Tung University and was governed by the newly established Ministry of Railways of the nationalist government. The Shanghai campus thereafter developed into four Colleges: the Colleges of Railway Management, the Colleges of Civil Engineering, the Colleges of Mechanical Engineering, and the Colleges of Electrical Engineering. In 1930, the College of Science consisting of three departments: Mathematics, Science, and Chemistry, was added to the campus. At the same time, the Institute of Industry in Shanghai was expanded to include the Institute of Industry and the Institute of Economics.

In 1937, along with all the other higher education in China, the university came under the authority of the Ministry of Education. During the Sino-Japanese war, the university was relocated to the French Concession in Shanghai and then to various places in central China, such as Chung Ching, Hsiang Tan, and Pin Yueh. At the end of the war, all sectors of the university returned to their original campuses. Shortly afterwards the university was dissolved when the communists gained control of mainland China in 1949.

In 1957, due to the insistence of Chiao Tung University alumni at home and abroad and in view of the importance of developing the electronic industry for the national economy and defense, the Ministries of Education, Communications, Economic Affairs, and National Defense jointly recommended to the Executive Yuan that the university be reestablished at its present location in Hsinchu, Taiwan. A preparatory committee was appointed, with Mr. H.H. Lin, former president of the university, serving as the chairman. In July 1958, the establishment of the National Chiao Tung University Institute of Electronics was formally recognized by the government. The institute was to offer a two-year graduate program leading to the degree of Master of Science in Electrical Engineering. S. M. Lee was appointed as the institute's first director.

In compliance with a contract between the Ministry of Education and the United Association of International Telecommunications, the Telecommunication and Electronics Training Center (TETC) was established at the Hsinchu campus in 1961, with special funding from the United Nations. The TETC introduced computer technology, initiating television broadcasting, and manufacturing the island's first transistors and solid-state lasers.

As a result of TETC's success, the Computer and Electronics Center was established in 1962. Later, in response to requests from the alumni and to the directives given by the Ministry of Education, two undergraduate departments were organized at NCTU in 1964: the Department of Electrophysics and the Department of Electronic Engineering. In the same year, construction commenced on the university's Semiconductor Research Laboratory. In 1965, the Department of Control Engineering and the Department of Communication Engineering were established. In May 1967, the Institute of Electronics was formally transformed into the College of Engineering, which then included the Institute of Electronics and four undergraduate programs. K. K. Chung became the first president of the university, serving from 1967 to 1969. He was succeeded by Mr. H.C. Liu, NCTU's president from 1969 to 1972.

In 1968, the university started a Ph.D. program in the area of electronics. It was the first program to offer graduate study at the doctoral level in science and technology in Taiwan. Besides, within the College of Engineering, the Institute of Management Science was founded in 1970, and the Department of Management Science was founded in 1971.

In 1972, C. L. Shen became the president of the university. During Shen's tenure, the university expanded rapidly, setting up the Department of Computer Engineering (1972), the Department of Navigation and Marine Engineering (1973), the Department of Ocean Transportation (1973), the Department of Transportation Management (1974) (the latter two departments were combined into the Department of Transport Engineering and Management in 1980), the Institute of Computer Science (1974), the Institute of Traffic and Transportation (1976), the Department of Mechanical Engineering (1976), the Institute of Applied Mathematics (1977), and the Department of Civil Engineering (1978). In addition, during this period the university conducted a national-level electronics research project with support from the National Science Council of the R.O.C.

In August 1978, Kuo Nan-hong, an alumnus of NCTU's Hsinchu campus, was appointed the president of the university. During his presidency, the school matured into a complete university, consisting of twelve departments and twelve graduate Institutes. These programs were divided into three colleges – the College of Science, the College of Engineering, and the College of Management.

The graduate institutes established under Kuo's leadership included: the Institute of Information Science (1980), the Institute of Electro-Optical Engineering (1980), the Institute of Applied Chemistry (1981), the Institute of Control Engineering (1982), and the Institute of Mechanical Engineering (1982). In 1982, the Semiconductor Research Center was set up in cooperation with the National Science Council. In 1984, the Microelectronics and Information Science and Technology Research Center was founded. The Department of Navigation and Marine Engineering was incorporated into the Department of Industrial Engineering and Management. In 1985, the Institute of Civil Engineering was established within the College of Engineering.

Negotiations on a merger between National Yang-ming University and National Chiao Tung University began in December 2018. Both educational institutions voted to proceed with the merger in September 2019, which was approved by the Ministry of Education in June 2020. The two universities merged into National Yang Ming Chiao Tung University in February 2021.

== Academics ==
=== Applied Chemistry ===
A special feature of NCTU was that it attracts relatively large number of foreign students, researchers and teachers, which highlights the intensifying internationalization trend throughout the Taiwanese higher education establishment. For example, the Department of Applied Chemistry at NCTU employs ca. 15 foreign professors. The areas of strength of the Department of Applied Chemistry at NCTU include: time-resolved spectroscopies, mass spectrometry, polymer science, bioanalytics, nanotechnology, and green chemistry. In 2013, the International Master Program for Interdisciplinary Molecular Science of Materials and Chemical Biology (SPIMS) was launched. Students of SPIMS are given a selection of topics in materials science and chemical biology. Courses are taught in English. DAC at NCTU had strong links with the Academia Sinica with which it opened a graduate program in Sustainable Chemical Science and Technology.

=== Business and Management ===
NCTU's MBA business program was AACSB accredited and was ranked in the top five programs throughout Asia by the business magazine Asia Inc. Their business alumni dominate the financial sector in Taiwan, with NCTU having graduated more top executives than any other university in the country. NCTU's Master program in Global Business Administration was multi-national, with foreign students comprising fifty percent of the student base. The student body encompasses students from North America, Europe, South America and Asia each year. Top students receive personal mentoring by business executives through the university's Alumni Mentoring Program.

=== Computer Science ===
Based on the Essential Science Indicators compiled by the Institute for Scientific Information (ISI), NCTU ranks 21st worldwide in the field of computer science. According to the 2013 Academic Ranking of World Universities conducted by Shanghai Jiaotong University, NCTU ranks 35th in Computer Science.

=== Electrical Engineering ===
Based on the Academic Ranking of World Universities conducted by Shanghai Jiaotong University, NCTU ranks #3 in Taiwan (and mainland China plus Hong Kong), and was in the top ten in the Asia/Pacific region in the field of engineering. A collegiate chapter of IEEE-Eta Kappa Nu (ΗΚΝ), the honor society for IEEE, was established at NCTU in 2018.

== Organization ==
NCTU had eight colleges: Biological Science and Technology, Computer Science, Electrical Engineering, Engineering, Hakka Studies, Humanities and Social Sciences, Management, and Science. The School of Law includes the Institute of Technology Law.

College of Engineering

College of Computer Science

College of Management

== International programs ==
NCTU participates in the Bioinformatics Program of the Taiwan International Graduate Program of Academia Sinica, Taiwan's academic research institution.

== Libraries and culture ==
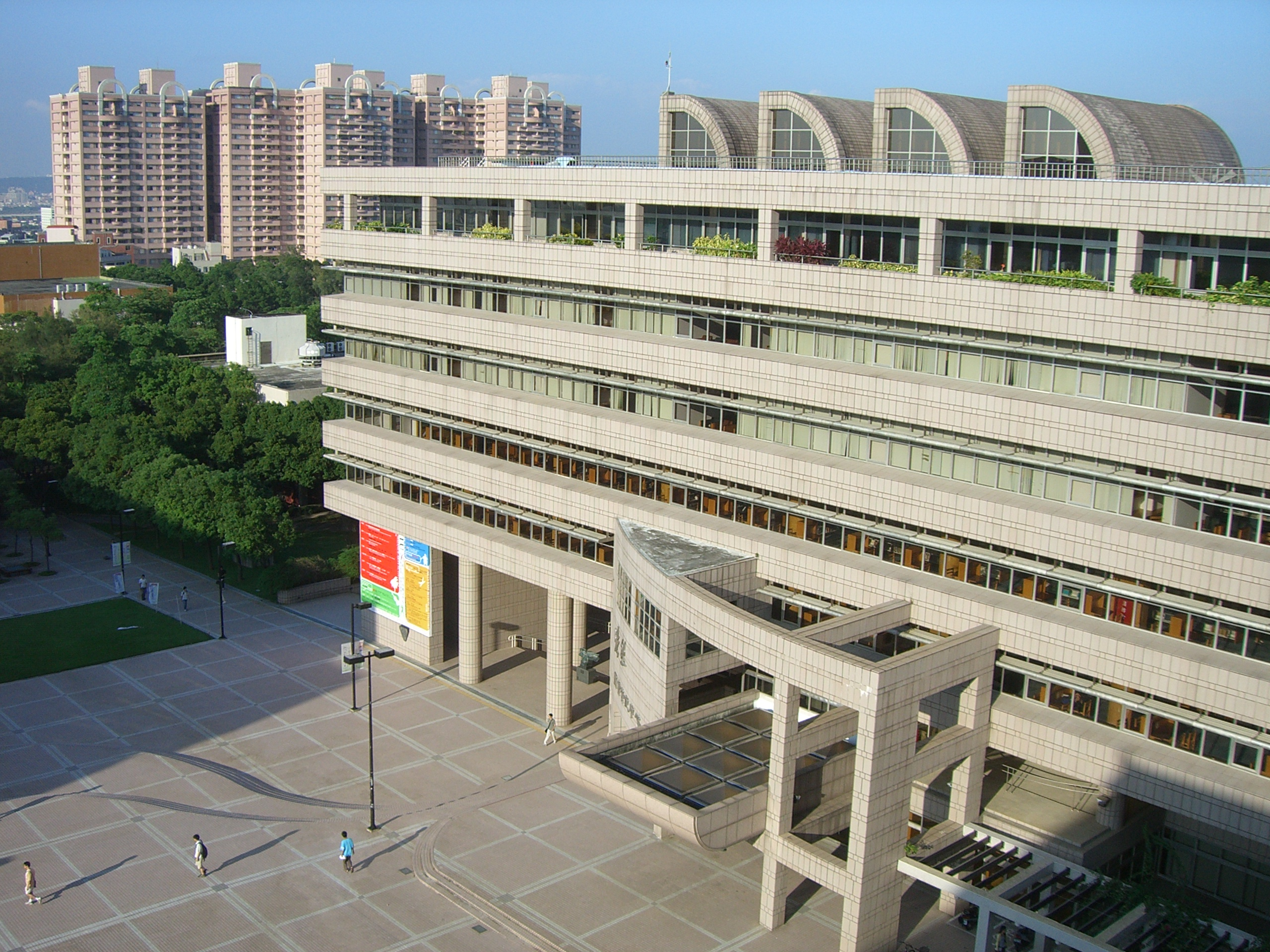
NCTU Library

The National Chiao Tung University Library System, centered in the main square of the university campus, was home to the largest collection of English literature in Taiwan. With two floors dedicated to English texts, it was larger than that of many English libraries at colleges in the United States. The library area was 32,000 square meters and was set in scenic surroundings with a Taiwanese garden. It had over 1,000,000 volumes of printed texts, more than 3,000 periodicals, over 10,000 full text electronic journals, and more than 100 reference databases.

NCTU operates arts, cultural and scientific museums. On the seventh floor of the library was a traditional Taiwanese garden reminiscent of a tranquil courtyard. The grand lobby area had a rotating display of ancient artifacts. The library lobby also had a grand piano, where students from the Music Institute sometimes display their talents. Showrooms are interspersed throughout the library, showcasing artistic talent, historical pieces, and other works of art and scientific discovery. A few of the showrooms are rotating and periodically showcase works by local students. NCTU maintains a museum on the history of the university where original documents for the university are on display.

As the famous folk religions in NCTU, many students visit the local Tu Di Gong temple, located in front of the North Gate, to pray before exams, believing the god will give them good luck and get a good score.

== Notable alumni and faculty ==
- Robert H. Rines, inventor of radar and sonar
- Stan Shih, founder of Acer Group.
- Jack Kilby, Nobel Prize laureate in physics.
- Yuan T. Lee, Nobel Prize laureate in Chemistry.
- C. C. Wei (business executive), president, chairman, and CEO of TSMC
- Simon Sze, discovery in physics of the floating gate transistor.
- Leo Esaki, Nobel Prize laureate in physics.
- Gao Xingjian, Nobel Prize laureate in literature
- M. C. Frank Chang, Professor of Electrical Engineering, UCLA.
- Hsinchun Chen, McClelland Professor of Management Information Systems, University of Arizona.
- Jin Au Kong, Professor of Electrical Engineering, MIT.
- Edward Yang, film director.
- Giddens Ko, Blogger, Author and Film Director
- Joyce C. H. Liu, Director IICS-UST, Professor of Cultural Study
- The Anh Phan, Travel Influencer

== Professors ==
- Chang Chun-Yen, President of NCTU, pioneer of Taiwan's semiconductor industry
- Wai-Chi Fang, TSMC Chair Professor
- Yi-Bing Lin, Department of Computer Science and Information Engineering
- Joyce C. H. Liu, Graduate Institute for Social Research and Cultural Studies
- Henryk Witek, Department of Applied Chemistry
- I-Chen Wu, Department of Computer Science

== Presidents (after 1958) ==
- Li Hsi-mou (August 1958 – 1967)
- Chung Chao-kuang (1967–1969)
- Liu Hao-chun (1969–1972)
- Kuo Nan-hong (1972; acting)
- Sheng Ching-lai (1972–1978)
- Kuo Nan-hong (1978–1987)
- Juan Ta-nien (May 1987 – July 1992)
- Den Chi-fu (1992–1998)
- Chang Chun-yen (August 1998 – February 2006)
- Huang Wei (August 2006 – February 2007; acting)
- Wu Chung-yu (February 2007 – January 2011)
- Wu Yan-hwa (February 2011 – July 31, 2015; acting after February 2015)
- M. C. Frank Chang (August 1, 2015 – July 31, 2019)
- Chen Hsin-hong (since August 1, 2019; acting)

== Sports and athletic facilities ==
NCTU athletic facilities are home to the university sports teams. It was important in eastern philosophy to exercise the mind and the body, such that they may be in harmony. The sport arena was open to all students.

NCTU was part of the nation's most renowned inter-university competition, The Mei-Chu Tournament. The annual tournament between NCTU and rival National Tsing Hua University (NTHU) was compared to the Oxford and Cambridge boat race as well as the Harvard and Yale annual football competition known as The Game. NCTU and NTHU have held the annual event since 1968 and NCTU holds the trophy which was brought back to the university in 1999 where it remained since.

== Architecture and campus grounds ==
The university ascribes to the eastern philosophy of feng shui. Effort were made to strike a balance between the university architecture and nature. The building designs strike a balance between traditional eastern values and modern advancement. Gardens are interspersed throughout the campus and create a peaceful environment for learning. Renowned artists including Yuyu Yang have contributed sculptures and artwork to the grounds.

== Rankings ==
University rankings

Global – Overall
- ARWU World: 401-500 (2020)
- QS World: 240 (2021)
- THE World: 501-600 (2021)

Regional – Overall
- QS Asia: 46 (2021)
- THE Asia: 89 (2020)

NCTU was generally considered to be one of the top universities in Taiwan.

According to the Academic Ranking of World Universities, NCTU was ranked 301-400th in Computer Science in 2020. It was ranked 76-100th worldwide in the engineering field in 2016. NCTU in Taiwan, along with its sister campuses such as Shanghai Jiao Tong University in mainland China, comprises the largest alumni network in the entire Asia/Pacific region and draws students from over 42 countries around the world.

In 2014, the Representative of Japan in Taiwan listed NCTU as one of the seven well-known Taiwanese universities.

Since its merger with the National Yang Ming University (NYMU) in 2021, NCTU has been ranked under the entity of the National Yang Ming Chiao Tung University (NYCU).

== See also ==
- List of universities in Taiwan
  - List of schools in the Republic of China reopened in Taiwan
- List of Chinese language schools in Taiwan
- National Yang Ming Chiao Tung University
