= Joyce C. H. Liu =

Taiwanese cultural scholar

- 劉紀蕙

Personal details
- Born: 1956 (age 69–70)
- Education: University of Illinois (Ph.D.)
- Profession: geopolitics, biopolitics, border politics, internal coloniality, unequal citizens, and epistemic/artistic decolonization.

Joyce Chi-Hui Liu (Chinese: 劉紀蕙) is a Taiwanese scholar of cultural studies, comparative literature, and political philosophy. She is a Professor in the International Graduate Program in Inter-Asia Cultural Studies at National Yang Ming Chiao Tung University (NYCU), Taiwan, and serves as Director of the International Center for Cultural Studies (ICCS) and the International Institute for Cultural Studies of the University System of Taiwan (UST). Her research interests include geopolitics, biopolitics, border politics, internal coloniality, unequal citizens, and epistemic/artistic decolonization.

== Education and academic career ==
Liu received her Ph.D. in Comparative Literature from the University of Illinois at Urbana-Champaign, U.S.A. in 1984. She taught in the Department of English at Fu Jen Catholic University (FJU) and later served in the Graduate Institute of Comparative Literature there. In 2001, she joined National Chiao Tung University (NCTU), where she served as the Founding Director of the Institute of Social Research and Cultural Studies (SRCS) and related academic programs.

Since 2012, Liu has served as Director of the International Institute for Cultural Studies (IICS) under the University System of Taiwan (UST). In 2013, she became Director of the International Graduate Program in Inter-Asia Cultural Studies. In 2019, she became a Chair Professor of the Institute of Social Research and Cultural Studies (SRCS). Following the merger of National Chiao Tung University (NCTU) and National Yang Ming University (NYMU), she continued her academic appointments at National Yang Ming Chiao Tung University (NYCU), where she remains Professor and Director of the International Center for Cultural Studies (ICCS).

== Scholarship and contributions ==
Liu's publications address modernity, ethics, psychoanalysis, subjectivity, and Chinese and East Asian political thought. Her work also engages with colonial history, nationalism, migration, and globalization in modern and contemporary Asia. From 2011 to 2017, she served as the editor-in-chief of the only journal of cultural studies in Taiwan, Wenhua Yanjiu (文化研究, Router: A Journal of Cultural Studies). In recent years, Liu has led several interdisciplinary and transnational research projects, including the “Conflict, Justice, and Decolonization” projects under Taiwan’s MOE SPROUT program, the CHCI–Mellon Foundation project “Migration, Logistics, and Unequal Citizens in the Global Context” (2019–2022), and the “Transit Asia Research Network” (2023–2027). In 2020, she received the Outstanding Research Award from Taiwan’s Ministry of Science and Technology. Since 2025, she has been a member of the Scientific Committee of Falling in Law, an international network of Law and Culture founded in Bologna by the Italian civil law scholar Antonio Albanese.

== Publications ==
Liu has published extensively on cultural theory, modernity, and political thought in Asia, with a particular focus on subjectivity, ethics, and the historical conditions of colonial and postcolonial societies. Her work often brings together comparative literature, psychoanalysis, and critical theory to examine the formation of modern subjects and the dynamics of power, migration, and geopolitical transformation in East and Southeast Asia. She has authored and edited multiple books and scholarly volumes in both Chinese and English.

=== Books and monographs (author) ===
- The Topology of the History of Mentalities: How to Face the Contemporary? How to Comprehend the History? Taipei: Shibao Publishing, 2023. 208 ps.
- One Divides into Two: Philosophical Archaeology of Modern Chinese Political Thought. Taipei: Lianjing Publisher, 2020. 464 ps.
- The Topology of Psyche: The Post-1895 Reconstruction of Ethics. Taipei: Flaneur, 2011. 446 ps. (NSC Publication Award 2011)
- The Perverted Heart: The Psychic Forms of Modernity. Taipei: Ryefield Publisher, 2004. 368 ps. (NICT Publication Award 2004)
- Literature and Film: Image, Reality and Cultural Criticism. Taipei. 161 ps. (Publication sponsored by NSC)
- Orphan, Goddess, and the Writing of the Negative: The Performance of Our Symptoms. Taipei: Lixu Publisher, 2000. 470 ps.
- Eight Essays on Literature and the Other Arts: Intertextuality, Counterpoint and Cultural Interpretation. Taipei: San Ming Books Publisher, 1994. 193 ps. (with review system)

=== Books (editor) ===
- Where are the People? People's Theater in Inter-Asian Societies. Qi Li, Zikri Rahman, Joyce C.H. Liu, eds. English edition. ISBN 9789865470500. Chinese edition ISBN 9789865470517. Hsinchu, Taiwan: National Yang Ming Chiao Tung University Press. Nov, 2022.
- Global Coloniality and the World Disorder: A Decoloinal Take. By Walter Mignolo. Chinese Translation. Eds. Hui-Yu Tang & Joyce C.H. Liu. 9789865470173.
- East-Asian Marxisms and their Trajectories. Eds. Joyce C.H. Liu & Viren Mirthy. London: Routledge, 2017. ISBN 978-1138919846.
- European-East Asian Borders in Translation. Eds. Joyce C.H. Liu, Nick Vaughan-Williams. London: Routledge, 2014. ISBN 978-0415831314
- Biopolitics, Ethics and Subjectivation. Eds. Joyce C.H. Liu & Alain Brossai, Yuan-Horng Chu, Rada Ivekovic. Paris: L’Harmattan, 2011.
- Visual Culture and Critical Theory I: Empire, Asia and the Question of Subject. Ed. Joyce Chi-Hui Liu. Taipei: Ryefield Publisher, 2006.
- Visual Culture and Critical Theory II: Everyday Life and Popular Culture. Ed. Joyce Chi-Hui Liu. Taipei: Ryefield Publisher, 2006.
- Visual Theories and Cultural Studies. Ed. Joyce Chi-Hui Liu. Taipei: Chung Wai Publisher, 2002.
- The Realms of the Other: Cultural Identities and Politics of Representation. Ed. Joyce Chi-Hui Liu. Taipei: Ryefield Publisher, 2000.
- Writing Taiwan. Eds. Chou Yingxung & Liu Chi-Hui Joyce. Taipei: Ryefield Publisher, 2000.
- Inter-Frames: Word-Image-Music and the Semiotic Boundaries. Ed. Joyce Chi-Hui Liu. Taipei: Lixu Publisher, 1999.

=== Co-edited volumes ===
- Special Column: Against the Day: Migration Struggles, Colonial Legacies, and Pandemic Shifts. Eds. Joyce C.H. Liu & Brett Neilson. South Atlantic Quarterly 1 July 2021 (UGC CARE, Scopus, AHCI) (H-Index of 42; Impact Score 1.56)
- Inter-Asia Cultural Studies. Special Issue: Artistic mediation of Decolonized Body. Eds. Joyce C.H. Liu & Naoki Sakai. Vol. 19, Issue 4 (Dec. 2018).
- The Position of Philosophy and Politics: Special Issue on Alain Badiou. Chung Wai Literary Quarterly. Vol. 47, No. 3. September 2018.
- East-Asian Marxisms and their Trajectories. Eds. Joyce C.H. Liu & Viren Mirthy. London: Routledge, 2017.
- European-East Asian Borders in Translation. Eds. Joyce C. H. Liu and Nick Vaughan-Williams. London: Routledge, 2013. Forthcoming.
- Biopolitics, Ethics and Subjectivation. Eds. Joyce C.H. Liu & Alain Brossai, Yuan-Horng Chu, Rada Ivekovic. Paris: L'Harmattan, 2011.
- Special Issue: Koyasu Nobukuni Joyce C.H. Liu. Ed. Router: A Journal of Cultural Studies. 2008.
- Visual Culture and Critical Theory I: Empire, Asia and the Question of Subject Ed. Joyce Chi-Hui Liu. Taipei: Ryefield Publisher, 2006.
- Visual Culture and Critical Theory II: Everyday Life and Popular Culture Ed. Joyce Chi-Hui Liu. Taipei: Ryefield Publisher, 2006.
- Visual Theories and Cultural Studies. Ed. Joyce Chi-Hui Liu. Taipei: Chung Wai Publisher, 2002.
- The Realms of the Other: Cultural Identities and Politics of Representation. Ed. Joyce Chi-Hui Liu. Taipei: Ryefield Publisher, 2002.
- China as Sign, Taiwan as Icon. Ed. Joyce Chi-hui Liu. Taipei: Chungwai Wenxue, 2000.
- Writing Taiwan. Eds. Chou Yingxung & Liu Chi-Hui Joyce. Taipei: Ryefield Publisher, 2000.
- Inter-Frames: Word-Image-Music and the Semiotic Boundaries. Ed. Joyce Chi-Hui Liu. Taipei: Lixu Publisher. 1999.

=== Scholarly translations into Chinese ===
- La Mésentente. Politique et philosophie. by Jacque Rancière. co-translated with Shufen Lin, Kelun Chen, Xiping Xue. Taipei: Maitian Publisher. 2011.
- An Introductory Dictionary of Lacanian Psychoanalysis by Dylan Evans. co-translated with Chaoyang Liao, Zonghui Huang, Zhuojun Gong. Taipei: Juliu Publisher. 2009.
- Milky Way. by Kaja Silverman. chungwai wenxue. 30.12 (2002.5): 25–53.
