= Henryk Witek =

Polish-Taiwanese chemist

Henryk A. Witek is a chemist of Polish origin, and is a Professor of Chemistry in the National Chiao Tung University, Hsinchu, Taiwan. He obtained his scientific degrees from the Jagiellonian University (MS) and the University of Tokyo (PhD). His research interests encompass quantum and physical chemistry, applied linear algebra, as well as perturbation theory.

== Achievements ==
Using computational methods, he carried out simulations of infrared spectra of Criegee intermediates (CH2OO). This achievement (published in Science) has important implications on the understanding of fundamental processes in environmental chemistry.

== Representative publications ==
- Henryk A. Witek, Takahito Nakijima, Kimihiko Hirao, "Relativistic and correlated all-electron calculations on the ground and excited states of AgH and AuH", J. Chem. Phys. 113, 8015 (2000).
- Henryk A. Witek, Stephan Irle, Keiji Morokuma, "Analytical second-order geometrical derivatives of energy for the self-consistent-charge density-functional tight-binding method", J. Chem. Phys. 121, 5163 (2004).
- Su YT, Huang YH, Witek HA, Lee YP, "Infrared absorption spectrum of the simplest Criegee intermediate CH2OO", Science 340, 174 (2013).

== Awards ==
In 2005, he obtained Young Faculty Award and Scholarship from the Foundation for the Advancement of Outstanding Scholarship. In 2006, he became one of four awardees of the American Chemical Society Outstanding Junior Faculty Award, in 2010, he received the Distinguished Young Chemist Award from the Chinese Chemical Society, and in 2014, he was awarded the APATCC Pople Medal "for his innovative contributions to theoretical and mathematical aspects of quantum chemistry, particularly his contributions to multireference perturbation theory and the density-functional tight-binding method".

== Teaching ==
As an academic teacher, he offers semestral courses in general and quantum chemistry. Some of them are available online via the OpenCourseWare platform. In fall 2017, he taught "Perturbation theory for linear operator", using the book titled the same as the course by mathematician Tosio Kato.
