= Jui-Chʻi Liu =

Taiwanese academic

Professor Jui-Chʻi Liu (Chinese: 劉瑞琪) is a professor of Institute of Visual Studies, National Yang Ming Chiao Tung University, Taipei, Taiwan. She is the author of articles on women photographers and artists, published in Anglo-American journals and Taiwanese journals and books. Her research interests include gender and visual cultures (visual arts, photography, fashion, film), history of photography, history of (post)modern art, art theories, as well as feminist and critical theories.

== Education ==
Liu obtained her B.A. in Foreign Languages and Literatures and her M.A. in Art History at National Taiwan University. She received her M.A. and Ph.D. from History of Art Department, Bryn Mawr College in 1996 and 1999.

== Career ==
Liu taught at National Cheng Kung University (1999-2006) and National Tsing Hua University (2005-2009) before joining in National Yang Ming University in 2009. She was the founding Director of Institute of Visual Studies at National Yang Ming University from 2013 to 2019. Her university has merged with National Chiao Tung University in February, 2021. She is currently a professor at the institute and is serving as the convener in The Arts Discipline, Department of Humanities and Social Sciences, National Science and Technology Council, Taiwan from 2022 to 2024.

== Awards and honors ==
Liu has received fellowships from National Science Council Projects and Ministry of Science and Technology Projects since 1999. Her most prodigious research and teaching awards include: the Academia Sinica Research Award for Junior Research Investigators in 2004,

Excellent Projects for Young Scholars, National Science Council from 2011 to 2013, and Distinguished Award for General Education Teachers, Ministry of Education, Taiwan in 2012.

== Publications in English ==
- “Female Desire and Transformed Masculinity: Imogen Cunningham’s Photographs of the Male Nude,” in Concentric: Literary and Cultural Studies, 47: 1 (March 2021), pp. 179-210
- “Beholding the Feminine Sublime : Lee Miller’s War Photographs,” in Signs : Journal of Women in Culture and Society, 40: 2 (Winter 2015), pp. 308-19.
- “Female Spectatorship and the Masquerade: Cindy Sherman’s Untitled Film Stills,” in History of Photography, 34: 1 (Feb. 2010), pp. 79-89.
- “Francesca Woodman’s Self-Images: Transforming Bodies in the Space of Femininity,” in Woman’s Art Journal, 25: 1 (Spring/ Summer 2004), pp. 26-31.

== Selected publications in Chinese ==
- “Trans-corporeality and the Ecological Time: Ana Mendieta’s Silueta Series (1973-1980),” in Taida Journal of Art History, 56 (March 2024), pp. 187-262.
- “Celebrating Glamorous Camp: Nan Goldin’s Photographs of Drag Queens in the Early 1970s,” in Journal of Art Studies, 29 (Dec. 2021), pp. 119-177.
- “Creating the Feminine/Maternal Jouissance in Potential Space: The Art of Dorothea Tanning,” in Taida Journal of Art History, 46 (March 2019), pp. 175-222.
- “The Feminine Sublime,” in Router: A Journal of Cultural Studies, 17 (Fall 2013), pp. 87-122.
- “Camera as Weapon: Tina Modotti’s Revolutionary Photography,” in Taida Journal of Art History, 34 (Mar. 2013), pp. 163-228.
- “Calling the Hidden Name of the Female Dandy?: Berenice Abbott's Portrait Photographs of the Lesbian Writers in the 1920s,” in Router: A Journal of Cultural Studies, 13 (Autumn 2011), pp. 7-56.
- “Helen Levitt's Photography of Female Flânerie,” in Chung Wai Literary Quarterly, 39: 2 (June 2010, pp. 91-141.
- “Diane Arbus’s Halloween of Wonder: The Re-enchantment and Communitas of Women with Down’s Syndrome,” in Taida Journal of Art History, 26 (Mar. 2009), pp. 93-134.
- “The Illusion of Reality: Jerry Uelsmann’s Photography of Post-Visualization,” in Whispers of Blended Shadows: The Art of Jerry Uelsmann (Taipei: Taipei Fine Arts Museum, 2008), pp. 28-31.
- “Between Voyeurism, Seduction, and Confrontation: Mary Ellen Mark’s Ward 81,” in Taiwanese Journal for Studies of Science, Technology and Medicine, 4 (Apr. 2007), pp. 109-149.
- Feminine Masquerade: Self-representations by Women Photographers (Taipei: Yuan-Liou, 2004).
- “Maternal Fetishism in Sally Mann’s Photographs of Her Children,” in Taida Journal of Art History, 17 (Sep. 2004), pp. 191-226.
- “Francesca Woodman's Body Art,” in Changing Bodies: Concepts and Images of the Body in Western Art, ed. Shai-Shu Tzeng (Taipei: SMC, 2004), pp. 239-264.
- “Cindy Sherman’s Grotesque Parody,” in Chung Wai Literary Monthly, 32: 7 (Dec. 2003), pp. 65-99.
- “Desperately Seeking Female Spectators: Cindy Sherman’s Untitled Film Stills,” in Journal of Women’s and Gender Studies, 15 (May 2003), pp. 153-193.
- “Sexual and Racial Identities in Florine Stettheimer's Self-representation,” in Journey of Healing: Women’s Spirituality and Artistic Representations, ed. Ying-ying Chien (Taipei: Fembooks, 2003), pp. 77-105.
- “Mirroring a Jewish Lesbian’s Identity: Self-representation by Claude Cahun,” in Humanitas Taiwanica, 55 (Nov. 2001), pp. 165-212.
- “The State of Research in Postwar American Abstract Painting,” in Taida Journal of Art History, 9 (Sep. 2000), pp. 207-237.
- “Feminist Approaches to Art History,” in Research on Women in Modern Chinese History, 8 (Jun. 2000), pp. 195-235.
- “Edgar Degas in the Eyes of Women, Women in the Eyes of Edgar Degas,” in Con-Temporary Monthly, 139 (Mar. 1999), pp. 102-115.
