= Chang Chun-yen =

Taiwanese electrical engineer and professor

- 張俊彥
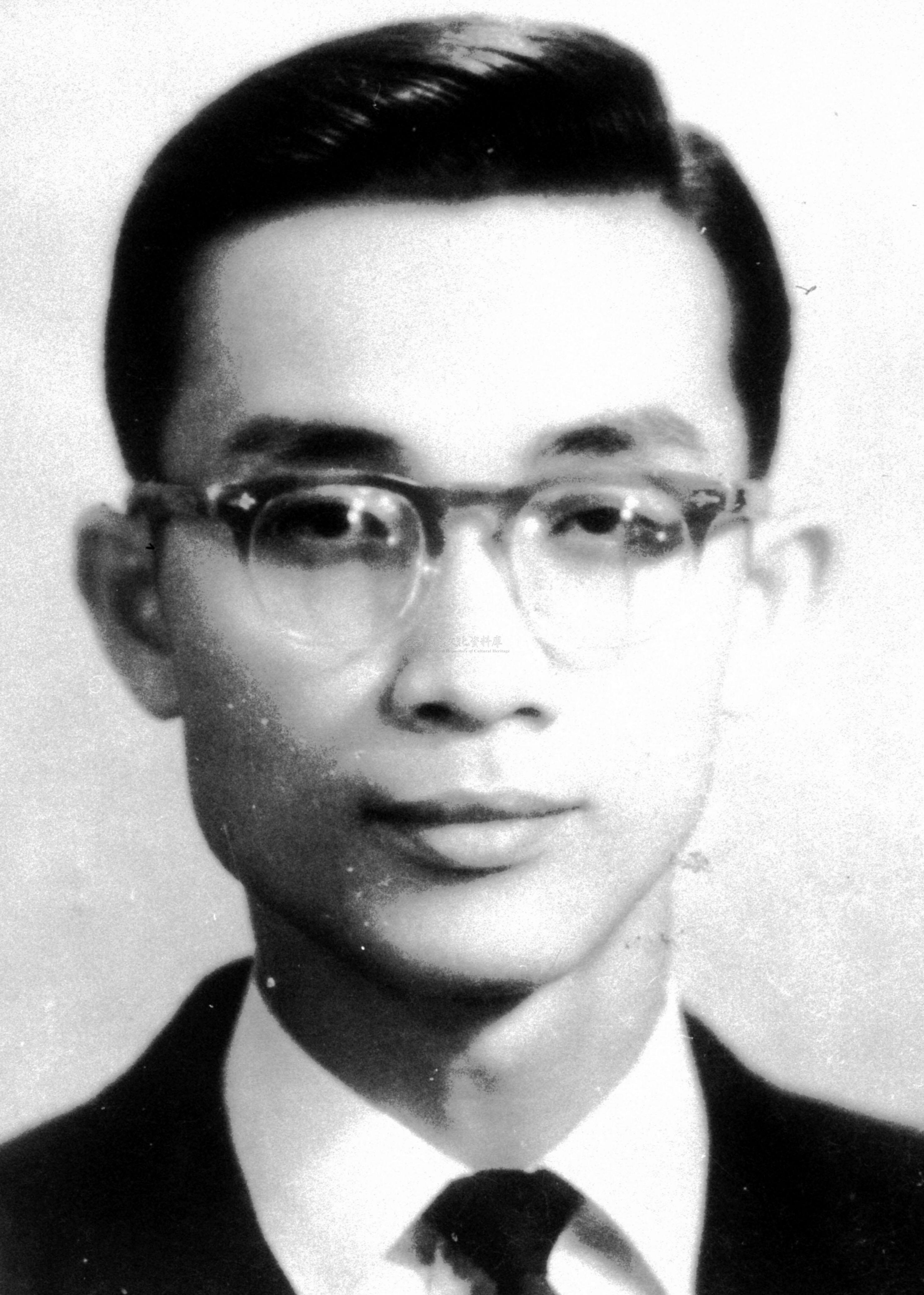
- Chang in 1970
- Born: 12 October 1937; Fongshan, Kaohsiung, Japanese Taiwan
- Died: 12 October 2018 (aged 81)
- Education: National Cheng Kung University (BS); National Chiao Tung University (MS, PhD)
- Occupations: Academic administrator, electrical engineer

Chang Chun-yen
- Traditional Chinese: 張俊彥
- Simplified Chinese: 张俊彦
Transcriptions
Standard Mandarin
- Hanyu Pinyin: Zhāng Jùnyàn
- Wade–Giles: Chang^{1} Chün^{4}-yen^{4}
- IPA: [ʈʂáŋ tɕwə̂njɛ̂n]
Southern Min
- Hokkien POJ: Tiuⁿ Chùn-gān

Chang Chun-yen (traditional Chinese: 張俊彥; 12 October 1937 – 12 October 2018) was a Taiwanese academic administrator and electrical engineer who served as the president of National Chiao Tung University (NCTU).

He was a member of Academia Sinica. He was also elected an international member of the US National Academy of Engineering in 2000 for contributions to Taiwanese electronics industry, education, and materials technology.

Chang is considered a founder of Taiwan's semiconductor industry, he was awarded the TWAS Prize for Engineering Sciences in 2006 and the Nikkei Asia Prize for Science in 2007.

== Early life and education ==
Chang was born on 12 October 1937 in Fongshan, Kaohsiung (formerly part of Tainan), Taiwan. His father, Chang Mu-huo (張木火) was a secondary school teacher who was fired after the February 28 incident and sentenced to death on charge of subversion for his involvement in the Madou incident.

Because of his father's involvement, Chang was blacklisted and forbidden from going abroad to study, and therefore received his entire education in Taiwan. After graduating with an electrical engineering degree from National Cheng Kung University (NCKU) in 1960, he studied at the graduate school of National Chiao Tung University (NCTU), where he earned his M.S. in 1962 and his Ph.D. in 1970, specializing in semiconductors. He was the first locally educated engineering Ph.D. in Taiwan.

== Career ==
In 1964, Chang, together with his colleagues Chang Jui-fu (張瑞夫) and Kuo Shuang-fa (郭雙發), founded the Semiconductor Research Center at NCTU, which was the first such center in Taiwan and considered the foundation of Taiwan's hi-tech industry.

He moved to National Cheng Kung University in 1977, where he pioneered Taiwan's research on semiconductor materials including gallium arsenide, amorphous silicon, and polycrystalline silicon. After 10 years at NCKU, he returned to NCTU in 1987 and established the National Nano Device Laboratories in 1990, serving as its director until 1997. He then served as director of NCTU's Microelectronics and Information System Research Center for a year.

On 1 August 1998, Chang became President of National Chiao Tung University. In 2002, he established the program "National System on Chip" (NSOC) to foster talent in system design. As the term of Yao Chia-wen was about to expire in 2008, Chang was the first nominee Ma Ying-jeou considered to lead the Examination Yuan. After Chang withdrew, John Kuan was selected.

Chang's former students went on to establish some of the largest hi-tech companies in Taiwan, including Acer, TSMC, and UMC. Chang served as an advisor to some of Taiwan's semiconductor companies. He donated more than NT$100 million from his earnings to the endowment of NCTU.

== Awards ==
Chang was elected as an IEEE Fellow in 1987 "for his contribution to semiconductor device development and to education". He became a member of Academia Sinica in 1996, and a foreign associate of the United States National Academy of Engineering in 2000.

Chang was awarded IEEE's Third Millennium Medal in 2000, the TWAS Prize for Engineering Sciences in 2006 "for his pioneering contributions to very large scale integration, opto-electronics, microwave devices and materials", and the Nikkei Asia Prize for Science in 2007.

== Illness and death ==
Chang was diagnosed with cancer in 2016. After two years of treatment, he died on 12 October 2018, his 81st birthday.

== Selected publications ==
A selection of Chang's articles published in scientific journals and conferences:

- Yu-Chien Chiu, Chun-Hu Cheng, Min-Hung Lee, Chun-Yen Chang, and Hsiao-Hsuan Hsu, "Impact of Nanoscale Polarization Relaxation on Endurance Reliability of One-Transistor Hybrid Memory Using Combined Storage Mechanisms", 2015 Symposium on VLSI Technology.
- Ya-Chi Cheng, Hung-Bin Chen, Chi-Shen Shao, Jun-Ji Su, Yung-Chun Wu, Chun-Yen Chang and Ting-Chang Chang, "Performance Enhancement of a Novel P-type Junctionless Transistor Using a Hybrid Poly-Si Fin Channel", 2014 IEEE International Electron Devices Meeting.
- Wei Lin, Shao-Wei Yen, Yu-Cheng Hsu, Yu-Hsiang Lin, Li-Chun Liang, Tien-Ching Wang, Pei-Yu Shih, Kuo-Hsin Lai, Kuo-Yi Cheng, and Chun-Yen Chang, "A Low Power and Ultra High Reliability LDPC Error Correction Engine with Digital Signal Processing for Embedded NAND Flash Controller in 40nm COMS", 2014 Symposium on VLSI Technology
- Hung-Bin Chen, Yung-Chun Wu, Chun-Yen Chang, Ming-Hung Han, Nan-Heng Lu, and Ya-Chi Cheng, "Performance of GAA poly-Si nanosheet (2nm) channel of junctionless transistors with ideal subthreshold slope", 2013 Symposium on VLSI Technology
- Shu-Hung Yu, Po-Ching Ho, Chia-Ling Lee, Chien-Chung Bi, Chih-Hung Yeh, Chun-Yen Chang, "Cost-Effective and Self-Textured Gallium-Doped Zinc Oxide Front Contacts for Hydrogenated Amorphous Silicon Thin-Film Solar Cells", Applied Physics Express 6 (2013) 022301
- Shih-Pang Chang, Jet-Rung Chang, Kuok-Pan Sou, Mei-Chun Liu, Yuh-Jen Cheng, Hao-Chung Kuo, and Chun-Yen Chang, ”Electrically driven green, olivine, and amber color nanopyramid light emitting diodes”, Opitc Express, vol. 21, issue 20, pp. 23030–23035 (2013)
- Yu-Cheng Hsu, Kuok-Pan Sou, Shih-Pang Chang, Kung-Shu Hsu, M. H. Shih, Hao-Chung Kuo, Yuh-Jen Cheng, and Chun-Yen Chang, "Room temperature ultraviolet GaN metal-coated nanorod laser", Applied Physics Letters 103, 191102 (2013)
- Ming-Hung Han, Hung-Bin Chen, Shiang-Shiou Yen, Chi-Shen Shao, and Chun-Yen Chang, "Temperature-dependent characteristic of junctionless bulk transistor", Applied Physics Letters 103, 133503 (2013).
