= Hsinchun Chen =

Academic background
- Education: National Chiao Tung University

Chinese name
- Traditional Chinese: 陳炘鈞
- Simplified Chinese: 陈炘钧
- Hanyu Pinyin: Chén Xīnjūn

Hsinchun Chen is the Regents' Professor and Thomas R. Brown Chair of Management and Technology at the University of Arizona and the Director and founder of the Artificial Intelligence Lab (AI Lab). He also served as lead program director of the Smart and Connected Health program at the National Science Foundation from 2014 to 2015. He received a B.S. degree from National Chiao Tung University in Taiwan, an MBA from SUNY Buffalo and an M.S. and Ph.D. in Information Systems from New York University.

== Research ==
Chen's research primarily focuses on data/web/text mining and knowledge management techniques. He has applied his work in the fields of web computing, search engines, digital libraries, health informatics, security informatics, biomedical informatics and business intelligence. His most notable contributions are in management information systems, digital libraries, health informatics, and security informatics.

He was the founding Editor-in-Chief (EIC) of the ACM Transactions on Management Information Systems (ACM TMIS), 2009–2014, and is also founding editor-in-chief of the Springer journal Security Informatics. He serves or has served on ten editorial boards including:

- IEEE Intelligent Systems
- ACM Transactions on Information Systems
- IEEE Transactions on Systems, Man, and Cybernetics
- Journal of the American Society for Information Science and Technology
- Decision Support Systems
- International Journal on Digital Library

Chen has also served as a Scientific Counselor/Advisor to the United States National Library of Medicine (NLM), Academia Sinica in Taiwan, and the National Library of China.

=== Productivity ===
In 2005, Chen was ranked #8 in publication productivity in Information Systems (CAIS 2005), #1 in Digital Library research (IP&M 2005), and #9 in a list of the "Top 32" most productive information systems researchers (EJIS 2007) in three bibliometric studies. In 2008, Chen was recognized as one of the top-ranked authors in the Management Information Systems field. His "H-index" score from Google Scholar is 90 (as of December 2017).

Chen has authored or edited more than 40 books and conference proceedings, 30 book chapters, 280 SCI journal articles, and 180 refereed conference articles. His books include: Dark Web (2012; ISBN 978-1-4614-1556-5), Infectious Disease Informatics (2010; ISBN 978-1-4419-1277-0), Sports Data Mining (2010; ISBN 978-1-4419-6729-9), Mapping Nanotechnology Innovations and Knowledge (2009; ISBN 978-0-387-71619-0), Terrorism Informatics: Knowledge Management and Data Mining for Homeland Security (2008, ISBN 978-0-387-71612-1), Digital Government: E-Government Research, Case Studies, and Implementation (2008; ISBN 978-0-387-71610-7); Intelligence and Security Informatics for International Security: Information Sharing and Data Mining (2006; ISBN 978-0-387-24379-5); and Medical Informatics: Knowledge Management and Data Mining in Biomedicine (2005; ISBN 978-0-387-24381-8), all published by Springer.

He spearheaded the development of the International Conference of Asian Digital Library (ICADL) and the IEEE International Conference on Intelligence and Security Informatics (ISI).

=== Development of COPLINK Software and Commercialization ===
In 1997, Chen began development of the COPLINK software, which supports information sharing, analysis, and visualization of law enforcement data. He founded Knowledge Computing Corporation (KCC) to commercialize COPLINK, which then entered the market in 2002 and is now used in thousands of law enforcement agencies across the United States. COPLINK's functions have been described in numerous local, regional, and national sources including the New York Times, the Boston Globe, and the Denver Post. In 2003, COPLINK was named a finalist for the IACP/Motorola Webber Seavey Award: Quality in Law Enforcement. In July 2009, KCC merged with i2 Inc., a market leader in security analytics. In September 2011, the KCC/i2 firm was acquired by IBM for $500 million. In October 2017, IBM sold Coplink to Forensic Logic.

=== The "Dark Web" Project ===
Chen is also the director of the Artificial Intelligence Lab's project, "Dark Web Terrorism Research," the goal of which is to develop and use automated tools to systematically collect and analyze terrorist content from the Internet. One software program developed as part of the project, "Writeprint," aims to support authorship identification of online postings and other writings. The Dark Web project is supported by grants from the National Science Foundation and other federal agencies, and has been recognized in the national press including Science News, Wired Magazine, Discover Magazine, and the Toronto Star.

=== The "Hacker Web" Project and AZSecure Program ===
Chen was awarded a grant of $1.2M from the National Science Foundation (NSF) for “Securing Cyber Space: Understanding the Cyber Attackers and Attacks via Social Media Analytics” (NSF SES #1314631). Co-PIs are Dr. Salim Hariri (UA; ECE); Dr. Ronald Breiger (UA; Sociology); and Dr. Tom Holt (MSU; Criminology). The Hacker Web project aims to investigate questions regarding hacker behavior, markets, and community structure, among other things. The intended result is a computational framework including algorithms, software, and tools for access and use by other researchers to examine how cyber attacker groups form, develop, and spread their ideas. The project is funded through August 2016.

Chen was also awarded $4.2M from NSF (with UA co-PIs Drs. Salim Hariri, Mark Patton, and Paulo Goes) for the AZSecure Cybersecurity Scholarship-for-Service program at The University of Arizona (NSF DUE #1303362). Project funds provide scholarships for undergraduate, graduate, and doctoral students studying cyber security, in exchange for government service. Students are recruited from across Arizona, including from military bases, community college, and tribal colleges. The program asserts a special emphasis on minority recruitment and retention. Program components are described as including student mentoring and development, independent study and research, internship and post-graduation placement assistance, and program assessment and evaluation. The program is aimed at helping to fill expected federal vacancies in cyber security and related positions over the next 5 years.

=== The Smart Health Project ===
Chen has developed the "Smart Health" project in his Lab, which lists the following research objectives: (1) developing technical approaches to support cyber-enabled patient empowerment; (2) developing personalized healthcare and community mapping techniques; and (3) conducting theory-driven assessment and evaluation research. DiabeticLink research includes information extraction, sentiment analysis, and social network analysis to be integrated into the DiabeticLink portal. SilverLink is being developed in the U.S., China, and Taiwan to support senior citizens living independently. SilverLink's capabilities include a home-health system that monitors fall detection, daily health status, and activity levels, and can alert caregivers in the event of anomalous situations. Chen also founded Caduceus Intelligence Corporation (CIC), a UA spinoff company working in the area of healthcare information systems. CIC lists web analytics, smart health, patient support, and knowledge discovery as its areas of expertise.

=== Data Infrastructure Building Blocks for Intelligence and Security Informatics ===
As part of ongoing work in intelligence and security informatics, Chen was awarded over $1.4M from NSF for a three-year pilot demonstration project to make available data and analysis tools to serve information and cyber security researchers. The funds are to support the creation of an archive of open source and other data, such as network data, data from honeypots, hacker forums, phishing data, and security-related tweets, in numerous languages including English, Arabic, French, Russian, and more. The project is also intended to provide tools and support for social network analysis and data visualization. The project is intended to serve individuals working in "academia, government, and industry to share data, information, and expertise relevant to research in intelligence and security informatics."

== Awards ==
He is a Fellow of ACM, IEEE and AAAS, and received the IEEE Computer Society Technical Achievement Award in 2006 and the INFORMS Design Science Award in 2008. A paper for which he was co-author was given the MISQ Best Paper Award for 2010 ("Detecting Fake Websites: The Contribution of Statistical Learning Theory", by Ahmed Abbasi, Zhu Zhang, David Zimbra, Hsinchun Chen, and Jay F. Nunamaker Jr., published in volume 34, issue 3 of MIS Quarterly). Also in 2010, he was recognized as "Distinguished Alumnus" of the National Chiao Tung University in Taiwan and named a Distinguished University Chair Professor of National Taiwan University. In 2011, he received the IEEE 2011 Research Achievement and Leadership Award in Intelligence and Security Informatics and was a finalist for the AZ Tech Council's Governor's Innovation of the Year Award. The Arizona Daily Star recognized his accomplishments as a top scientist in its 2012 series, "Centennial Salute to Science". In March 2013 he was named the Thomas R. Brown Chair in Management and Technology at the UA, as well as the UA's 2013 Innovator of the Year. In May he was inducted as a University of Arizona Regents' Professor. He was elected as a China National 1000-Elite Chair Professor with the Tsinghua University in 2013. In 2015 he was named a fellow of the Association for Computing Machinery "for contributions to the research and development of security informatics and health informatics systems."
