= Wai-Chi Fang =

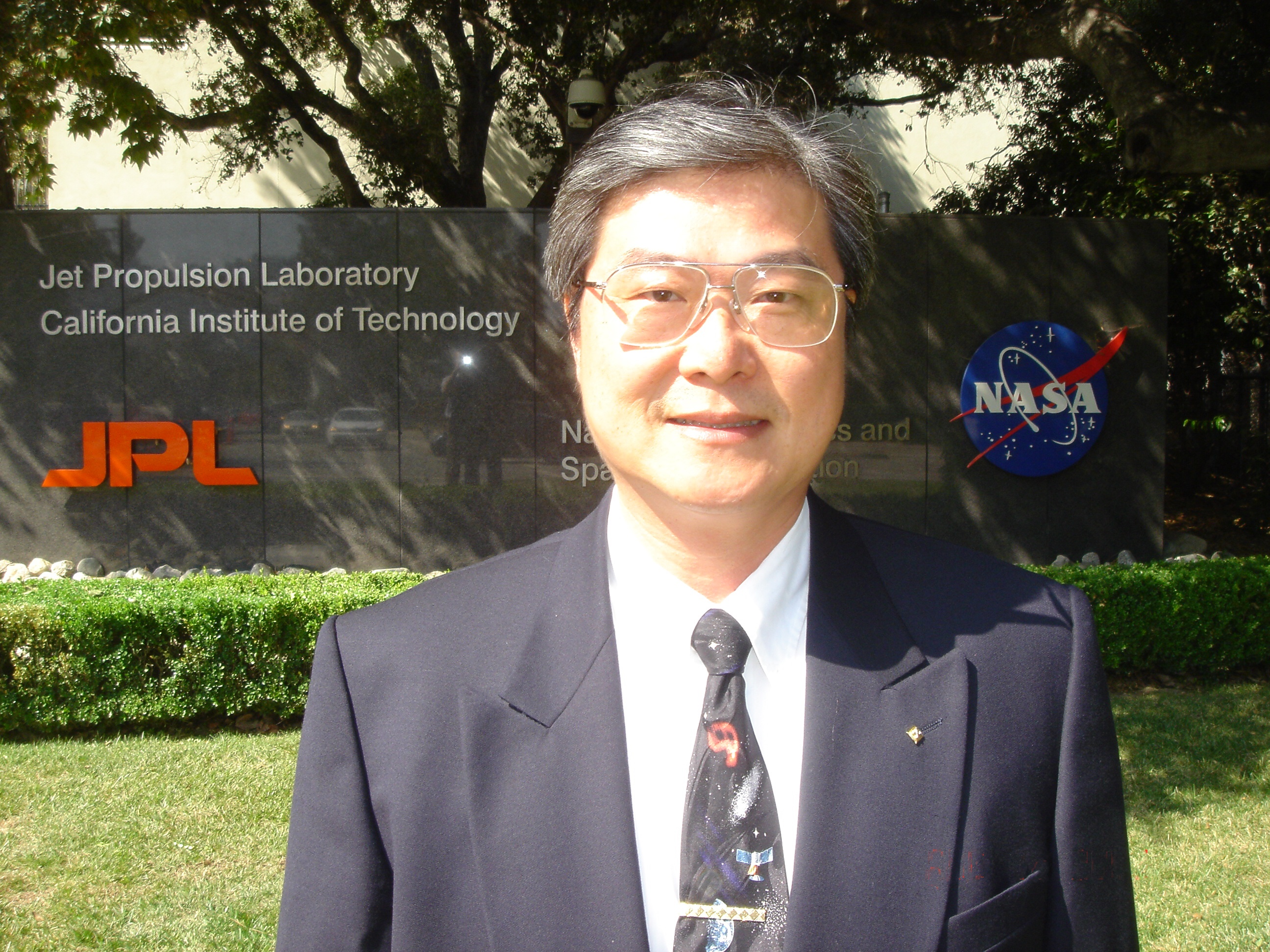
- Born: Wai-Chi Fang
- Occupation: Professor
- Website: NCTU

Wai-Chi Fang (Chinese: 方偉騏) is a Taiwanese engineer.

== Education ==
He received his B.Sc. from the Electronics Engineering Department at National Chiao Tung University in 1978. He completed his M.Sc. in 1982 from the State University of New York at Stony Brook and his Ph.D. in 1992 at the University of Southern California. He is currently the TSMC Chair Professor of National Chiao Tung University.

== Academic career ==
From 1985 to 2007, he had been with NASA’s Jet Propulsion Laboratory (JPL), California Institute of Technology. Fang’s subjects of interest include VLSI bio-medical microsystems, neural networks and intelligent systems, multimedia signal processing, wireless communication, sensor networks, and space integrated avionic systems. He has published over a hundred papers, patents and books. He is the recipient of 1995 IEEE VLSI Transactions Best Paper Award. He holds seven US patents and thirteen NASA new technologies. He is the recipient of NASA Certificates of Recognition for these creative technical innovations. He won the NASA Space Act award in 2002 and 2003. His inventions on advanced computing engines and data compression systems are used in space missions.

Fang is an IEEE Fellow. He is an elected Governor of the IEEE Circuits and Systems Society and an AdCom member of the IEEE Nanotechnology Council. He also serves as an officer of IEEE Systems Council as the Chairman of Transnational and Liaison Committee. Fang is the current Chairman of IEEE CASS Technical Committee on Nanoelectronics and Gigascale Systems. He serves on the Advisory Board of IEEE Systems Journal and the Advisory Board of International Journal of Innovative Computing, Information & Control.

He served as associate editor for the IEEE Transactions on Very Large Scale Systems (1997–1998), IEEE CASS Circuit and Device Magazine (1999–2000), IEEE Transactions on Multimedia (2000–2001), and IEEE Transactions on Circuits and Systems I (2002–2003). He was the general chairman of the 2006 IEEE International Conference on Intelligent Information Hiding and Multimedia Signal Processing. He served on Organization Committee and Technical Program Committee of many international conferences and workshops.

== Program Committee Chair and Organization Committee member ==
- Technical Program Co-Chair, First International Conference on Quantum, Nano, and Micro Technologies(ICQNM2007), Guadeloupe, French Caribbean January 2–6, 2007
- Track Chair (Track 7: Multimedia Systems and Applications), 2007 International Conference on Multimedia & Expo (ICME), July 2–5, 2007, Beijing International Convention Center, Beijing, China
- Publicity Co-Chair, 2007 International Conference on Frontiers in the Convergence of Bioscience and Information Technologies (FBIT 2007), October 11 ~ 13, 2007, Ramada Plaza Jeju, Jeju Island, Korea
- Steering Committee Chair, International Conference on Intelligent Pervasive Computing (IPC-07) October 11 ~ 13, 2007, Ramada Plaza Jeju, Jeju Island, Korea
- Publication Co-Chair, IEEE/NIH BISTI Life Science Systems and Applications Workshop (LISSA 2007) 8–9 November 2007, National Library of Medicine, NIH, Bethesda, Maryland, USA
- Advisory Committee Chair, 2007 International Conference on Intelligent Information Hiding and Multimedia Signal Processing (IIHMSP2007), November 26–28, 2007, Splendor Kaohsiung, Kaohsiung, Taiwan, ROC
- General Co-Chair, First International Conference on Future Generation Communication and Networking (FGCN2007), December 6–8, 2007, Jeju-Island, Korea
- General Chair, 2006 IEEE International Conference on Intelligent Information Hiding and Multimedia Signal Processing, Pasadena, CA, USA, Dec. 18-20, 2006
- General Conference Co-Chair, 2006 International Conference on Innovative Computing, Control and Information Processing, Peking, China, Aug.. 10-11, 2006
- Technical Program Co-Chair, 2006 IEEE Workshop on Life Science Systems and Applications, Maryland, USA, July 6–7, 2006
- Track Chair of Multimedia Hardware, Architecture, and Systems & Technical Program Committee Member, IEEE International Conference on Multimedia and Expo (ICME’06), Toronto, Canada, July 9–12, 2006
- Publicity Co-Chair & Program Committee Member, NASA/ESA Conference on Adaptive Hardware and Systems (AHS2008 & AHS-2006 )
- Track Chair of Nanoelectronics and Gigascale Systems & Technical Program Committee Member, IEEE International Symposium on Circuits and Systems, New Orleans, Louisiana, USA, May 27–30, 2007
- Track Chair of Nanoelectronics and Gigascale Systems & Technical Program Committee Member, IEEE International Symposium on Circuits and Systems, Island of Kos, Greece, May 21–24, 2006
- Technical Program Co-Chair, 2005 International Workshop on Intelligent Information Hiding and Multimedia Signal Processing, Hilton Hotel, Melbourne, Australia, Nov. 10-11, 2005
- Track Chair of Multimedia Systems and Applications & Technical Program Committee Member, IEEE International Symposium on Circuits and Systems, Kobe, Japan, May 23–26, 2005
- Track Chair of Multimedia Systems and Applications & Technical Program Committee Member, IEEE International Symposium on Circuits and Systems, Vancouver, Canada, May 23–26, 2004
- Track Chair of Neural Systems and Applications & Technical Program Committee Member, IEEE International Symposium on Circuits and Systems, Bangkok, Thailand, May 25–28, 2003

== The journal editor and journal advisor ==
- Advisor: Advisory Board of IEEE Systems Journal (2006 –date)
- Advisor: Advisory Board of International Journal of Innovative Computing, Information & Control (2006-date)
- Associate Editor: IEEE Transactions on Circuits and Systems I (2002–2003)
- Associate Editor: IEEE Transactions on Multimedia (2000–2001)
- Associate Editor: IEEE Circuits and Systems Society's Circuit and Device Magazine (1999–2000)
- Associate Editor: IEEE Transactions on Very Large Scale Systems (1997–1998)

== Honors ==
- IEEE (Institute of Electrical and Electronics Engineers) Fellow, 2003.
- Vice President-Member Service, IEEE Systems Council (2008–2010)
- IEEE the member of a council (2004–2009)
- Member, Administration Committee of the IEEE Nanotechnology Council (2007–2008)
- Chairman of Transnational and Liaison Committee, IEEE Systems Council (2005–2008)
- Regional Chapters Coordinator, IEEE Systems Council (2006–2008)
- Chairman, IEEE CASS Nanoelectronics & Gigascale Systems Technical Committee (2005–2007)
- Advisor, Advisory Board of IEEE Systems Journal (2006–date)
- General Chair, 2006 IEEE International Conference on Intelligent Information Hiding and Multimedia Signal Processing, Pasadena, CA, USA, Dec. 18-20, 2006
- Publicity Chair, IEEE International Symposium on Circuits and Systems, Taiwan, May 2009
- Board of Governors Member, IEEE Circuits and Systems Society (2004–2006, 2007–2009)
- Chairman, IEEE Circuits and Systems (CAS) Society, Nanoelectronics and Giga-scaled Systems Technical Committee (2005–2006, 2007)
- Member, Administration Committee of the IEEE Systems Council (2005–2006)
- Chairman, IEEE Circuits and Systems (CAS) Society, Multimedia Systems and Applications Systems Technical Committee (2003–2004)
- Chairman IEEE Circuits and Systems (CAS) Society, Neural Systems and Applications Technical Committee (2002–2003)
- NASA 2003 Space Act Award for New Technology Invention applied in Space entitled "VLSI Processor Design of Real-Time Data Compression for High Resolution Imaging Radar."」Feb. 28, 2003. (1st VLSI Data Compressor used in Space Mission)
- NASA 2002 Space Act Award for New Technology Invention applied in Space entitled "A Multi chip Module with RISC Processor with Programmable Hardware."」July 17, 2002.(1st Integrated Computer-on-MCM used in Space Mission)
