= National Yang Ming Chiao Tung University School of Law =

Coordinates: 24.7856°N 120.9985°E

NYCU School of Law
- Parent school: National Yang Ming Chiao Tung University
- Established: 2000; 26 years ago
- School type: Public law school
- Dean: Chih-hsiung Chen
- Location: Hsinchu, Taiwan
- Website: law.nycu.edu.tw/en

The National Yang Ming Chiao Tung University School of Law (NYCU Law) is the law school of National Yang Ming Chiao Tung University, a national university in Hsinchu, Taiwan.

The school has two degree programs: an LL.M. in international law and a Ph.D. in international law. It is one of the few law schools in Taiwan that teaches Anglo-American common law systems, alongside traditional civil law systems.

== Faculty ==
As of 2026, NYCU Law has 14 full-time faculty members: eight full professors, three associate professors, and three assistant professors. Part-time faculty consist of six visiting professors.

== Publications ==
- The NYCU Law Review is the flagship journal at the NYCU School of Law.
- Digital Law Asia is a platform that gathers scholars, practitioners, and legal experts from various regions to engage in academic discussion and analysis on subjects related to digital law in Asia. Digital Law Asia is overseen by a 5-person editorial board, which consists of scholars from three different universities in Taiwan. Digital Law Asia focuses on publishing shorter blog posts, accepting submissions that range from 500 to 2,000 words. In addition to written content, the platform also features multimedia elements such as podcasts and videos. The platform was established by the National Yang Ming Chiao Tung University Center for Digital Governance and Legal Innovation and the School of Law.

== Rankings ==
In 2023, NYCU Law was ranked 257 in the world in the subject of law and the 3rd best law school in Taiwan by the QS World University Rankings.

== Research Centers ==
The NYCU School of Law hosts research centers producing research and engaging in interdisciplinary legal studies. These research centers include: Center for Digital Governance and Legal Innovation, Center for Enterprise & Entrepreneurship, Center for Trans-Pacific Partnership and Transnational Trade Laws, and Research Center for Financial Regulation and Corporate Governance. The activities of these centers vary; for example, the Center for Digital Governance and Legal Innovation sponsors the Digital Law Asia platform to foster scholarly discussion and critical perspectives on digital law in Asia.

== See also ==
- National Yang Ming Chiao Tung University
