= M. C. Frank Chang =

American electrical engineer (born 1951)

Mau-Chung Frank Chang
- 張懋中
- Frank Chang (2026)
- Born: 1951 (age 74–75)
- Education: National Taiwan University (BS, 1968-1972); National Tsing Hua University (MS, 1972-1974); National Chiao Tung University (PhD, 1974-1979, with 20 months in military service)
- Known for: Heterojunction technology and mm-Wave Integrated Circuits and System
- Awards: AIME John Fritz Medal (2025); AASF Asian American Science/Technology Pioneer Medal (2024); IEEE/Royal Society of Edinburgh (RSE) James Clerk Maxwell Medal (2023); IET J. J. Thomson Medal for Electronics, United Kingdom (2017)
- Scientific career
- Fields: Electrical Engineering
- Workplaces: President of National Chiao Tung University (2015-2019); Distinguished Professor at the University of California, Los Angeles (UCLA)

Dr. Mau-Chung Frank Chang (Chinese: 張懋中; born 1951) is a Taiwanese-American electrical engineer and an educator. He is the Wintek Chair in Electrical Engineering and Distinguished Professor at the University of California, Los Angeles (UCLA)， where he conducts teaching and research on high-speed semiconductor devices and high-frequency integrated circuit and systems for radio, radar, RF-interconnect, imager, spectrometer, and Edge-AI accelerators. He is the Director of the UCLA High Speed Electronics Laboratory (HSEL), served as the Chairman of UCLA's Electrical Engineering Department from 2010-2015, and the President of National Chiao Tung University (NCTU) from 2015 to 2019.

== Early life and education ==
Chang's parents retreated from China to Taiwan during the Chinese Civil War in 1949. He was born in Taichung and grew up in Zhushan Township, Nantou County. He received his B.S. degree from the National Taiwan University in 1972, M.S. degree in Materials Science and Engineering from National Tsing Hua University in 1974, and Ph.D. degree in Electrical Engineering from National Chiao Tung University (NCTU) in 1979.

== Career ==
Chang and his students at UCLA first realized (sub)-mm-Wave systems-on-a-chip (SoC) for SWaP (size, weight, and power)-efficient radio, radar, interconnect, imager, and spectrometers for both commercial and spaceborne systems with transformative mechanisms and methodologies—this achievement has influenced the age of modern high-speed electronics across digital and analog domains. In the early 1990s, Chang and his research partners at Rockwell Science Center developed the world's first high-volume manufacturing process for MOCVD based GaAs heterojunction bipolar transistors (HBTs). This was a major advance that opened the way for the mass-market introduction of cellphones with adequate battery life in a small form factor. Most cellphones in the world today incorporate descendants of the original GaAs technology developed by Chang's Rockwell team. Upon joining UCLA in 1997, Chang expanded his research to (sub)-mm-Wave (Terahertz) circuit and systems, with focuses on system's re-configurability and broad/multi-band signaling capability. His invented digital controlled artificial dielectric (DiCAD) is the first proven “digital-to-permittivity/phase converter with True-Time-Delay at mm-Wave frequencies” and is now widely used by circuit designs in resonators, filters, inductors, transformers, and phase/amplitude shifters. Chang is the key individual who enabled the HBT productization and subsequently made ultra-high-frequency and high-speed CMOS system-on-chip (SoC) a reality. At UCLA, he has supervised more than 60 Ph.D. and 100 M.S. students, and published more than 500 technical papers and 70 US patents.

In November 2014, Chang was elected as the 11th president of National Chiao Tung University (NCTU). During his presidency (2015–2019), he was a key proponent of the merger between National Yang-Ming University and NCTU, leading to the establishment of National Yang Ming Chiao Tung University in February 2021.

== Personal life ==
Chang and his wife, Lin-Fong Shelly Chang, married in 1975; they have a son Albert, a daughter Pearl and three grandchildren.

== Awards and honors ==
His landmark contributions have been recognized with numerous prestigious awards:

- AIME John Fritz Medal (2025) "for pioneering contributions and innovations in the development of heterojunction and system-on-chip technologies with unprecedented functionality, bandwidth and reconfigurability."
- AASF（Asian American Scholar Forum） Asian American Science/Technology Pioneer Medal (2024)
- IEEE/Royal Society of Edinburgh (RSE) James Clerk Maxwell Medal (2023) "for contributions to heterojunction device technology and CMOS system-on-chip realizations with unprecedented reconfigurability and bandwidth."
- IEEE Darlington Best Paper Award (2021)
- IEEE HKN Vladimir Karapetoff Outstanding Technical Achievement Award (2018)
- IET J. J. Thomson Medal and Prize for Electronics, United Kingdom (2017) "for realizing MOCVD GaAs HBTs and CMOS Systems-on-Chip for RF-to-Terahertz radio, radar, imaging and interconnect applications."
- John J. Guarrera Engineering Educator of the Year Award from the US Engineers’ Council (2014)
- Distinguished Alumnus Award, National Taiwan University (2013)
- Honorary Doctor of Engineering, National Tsing Hua University (2013)
- Pan Wen Yuan Foundation Award (2008)
- IEEE David Sarnoff Award (2006)
- IEEE Fellow (1996)
- Leonardo da Vinci Award (Rockwell International Engineer of the Year) (1992)

== Fellowships and academy membership ==
- Eminent Member, IEE-HKN (2023)
- Member, European Academy of Sciences and Arts (2022)
- Fellow, US National Academy of Inventors (2015)
- Academician, Academia Sinica, Taipei, Taiwan (2012)
- Member, National Academy of Engineering (2008)
- IEEE Fellow (1996)

== Selected papers ==
- "A Reconfigurable Streaming Deep Convolutional Neural Network Accelerator for Internet of Things" (2021 IEEE Transactions on Circuits and Systems: Darlington Best Paper Award)
- "A Blocker-Tolerant, Noise-Cancelling Receiver Suitable for Wideband Wireless Applications" (2012 IEEE Journal of Solid State Circuits Best Paper Award)
- "A blocker-tolerant wideband noise-cancelling receiver with a 2dB noise figure" (San Francisco, CA. Distinguished Technical Paper Award & Jack Kilby Best Student Paper)
- "CMP network-on-chip overlaid with multi-band RF-interconnect" (Salt Lake City, UT. 2008 HPCA Best Paper Award)
- "A 60 GHz high gain transformer-coupled differential power amplifier in 65nm CMOS" (Yokohama, Japan. Best Paper of Conference Award)
- "A 71-86GHz 1024QAM Direct-Carrier Phase-Modulating Transmitter with Digital-to-Phase Converters and Constant-Envelope Phasors"
- "CMOS System-on-Chip Spectrometer Processors for Spaceborne Microwave-to-THz Earth and Planetary Science and Radio-Astronomy"
- "150-GHz CMOS TX/RX With Digitally Predistorted PAM-4 Modulation for Terahertz Contactless/Plastic Waveguide Communications"
- "183GHz 13.5mW/Pixel CMOS Regenerative Receiver for mm-Wave Imaging Applications"
- "A Low Phase Noise, Wideband and Compact CMOS PLL for Use in Heterodyne 802.15.3c Transceiver" (First to realize a broadband (57–65 GHz) CMOS frequency synthesizer by using an invented Digital Controlled Artificial Dielectric (DiCAD) with real-time variable permittivity and record-low phase noise of <-98dBc/Hz @1 MHz frequency offset.)
- "Self-Healing 4Giga-bit/sec Reconfigurable CMOS Radio-on-a-Chip"
- "RF/Wireless Interconnect for Inter- and Intra-chip Communications" (First article to address the feasibility of using multiband RF/wireless-Interconnect for both on-chip (inter CMP cores) and off-chip (inter CPU-Memories) simultaneous and bi-direction communications with higher aggregate data rate and lower power consumption.)
- "Role of the piezoelectric effect in device uniformity of GaAs integrated circuits" (A scientific discovery that led to the use of local compressive/tensile stresses to enhance the Field-Effect Transistor (FET) performance in specific carrier transport orientation on wafer and allow III-V FET to reach higher channel mobility and higher trans-conductance sometime even without channel doping for reduced dopants scattering effects.)
- "Terahertz CMOS Frequency Generator Using Linear Superposition Technique" (First to realize a CMOS signal source in Terahertz frequency range by using an invented Linear Superposition (LS) analog signal processing method even beyond the fmax of the CMOS devices.)
- "183GHz 13.5mW/Pixel CMOS Regenerative Receiver for mm-WaveImaging Applications" (First to realize a CMOS imager operating beyond 100 GHz with one order of magnitude lower power (~10 mW/pixel ) than competition for security screening and bio-imaging applications.)
- "A 60GHz CMOS VCO UsingOn-Chip Resonator with Embedded Artificial Dielectric for Size, Loss, and Noise Reduction" (First to realize a high-Q artificial dielectric resonator embedded in CMOS interconnect metals to achieve the lowest phase noise for any semiconductor based oscillators at mm-Wave frequencies.)
- "A Low Phase Noise, Wideband and Compact CMOS PLL for Use in Heterodyne 802.15.3c Transceiver" (First to realize a broadband (57–65 GHz) CMOS frequency synthesizer by using an DiCAD resonator with real-time variable permittivity and record-low phase noise of <-98dBc/Hz @1 MHz frequency offset.)
- "A 71-86GHz 1024QAM Direct-Carrier Phase-Modulating Transmitter with Digital-to-Phase Converters and Constant-Envelope Phasors" (First to achieve 1024QAM modulation at mm-Wave frequencies with direct carrier modulation and constant-envelope power amplification.)
