= National Yang Ming Chiao Tung University =

National university in Taipei and Hsinchu, Taiwan

- 國立陽明交通大學
- Motto: 真知力行，仁心仁術
- Motto in English: Devotion, Pragmatism, Unity, and Illumination
- Type: Public
- Established: 1 February 2021; 5 years ago
- Affiliations: UST; UAiTED
- Budget: NT$12.9 billion (2026) ($398 million USD)
- President: Lin Chi-Hung
- Faculty: 2,135 (2026)
- Undergraduates: 8,914 (2026)
- Postgraduates: 13,607 (2026)
- Doctoral students: 2,721 (2026)
- Location: Hsinchu, Taiwan; Taipei, Taiwan
- Mascot: Bamboo fox
- Website: www.nycu.edu.tw
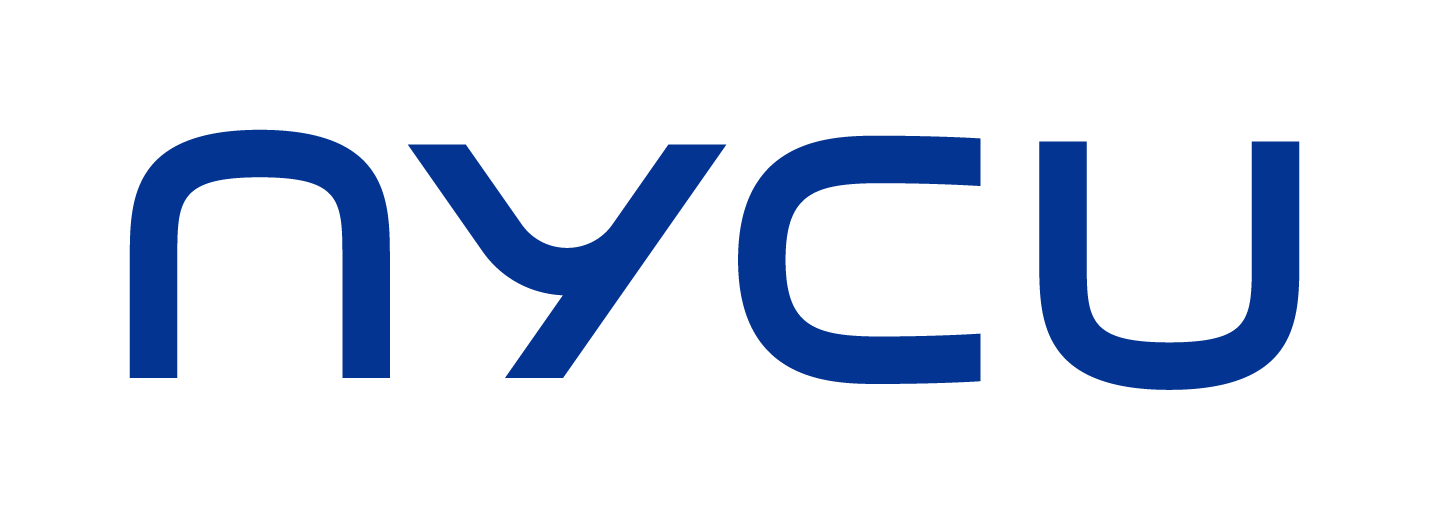

Chinese name
- Traditional Chinese: 國立陽明交通大學
- Simplified Chinese: 国立阳明交通大学
Transcriptions
Standard Mandarin
- Hanyu Pinyin: Guólì Yángmíng Jiāotōng Dàxué
- Wade–Giles: Kuo^{2}-li^{4} Yang^{2}-ming^{2} Chiao^{1}-tʻung^{1} ta^{4}-hsüeh^{2}

National Yang Ming Chiao Tung University (NYCU; Chinese: 國立陽明交通大學; pinyin: Guólì Yángmíng Jiāotōng Dàxué) is a public research university in Taiwan. Established in 2021, the university has its main campuses in Taipei and Hsinchu, with additional campuses in Zhubei, Tainan, and Kaohsiung. It also operates an affiliated teaching hospital in Yilan.

NYCU comprises 19 colleges offering undergraduate, graduate, and professional education in engineering, medicine, the natural sciences, humanities, and social sciences. The university conducts research in fields including semiconductor technology, artificial intelligence, and biomedical sciences. It is a member of the University System of Taiwan, an academic consortium of four national universities.

The university was established on 1 February 2021 through the merger of National Yang-Ming University and National Chiao Tung University. Chiao Tung traced its origins to Nanyang Public School, founded in Shanghai in 1896, and was reestablished in Hsinchu in 1958. Yang-Ming originated as National Yang-Ming College of Medicine, founded in Taipei in 1975. The merger combined Chiao Tung's engineering science programs with Yang-Ming's biomedicine and medical science programs.

== History ==
=== Merger and establishment (2001–2021) ===
Plans to merge National Yang-Ming University and National Chiao Tung University date to 2001, when the two institutions approved and signed a letter of intent to merge, although the proposal was suspended following opposition from alumni, faculty, and students. Renewed merger discussions in 2015 were also unsuccessful after Yang-Ming University's university council declined to approve a merger memorandum in 2016. In September 2018, Yang-Ming University's university council voted to resume merger discussions, with both Chiao Tung University and National Tsing Hua University expressing interest. In December 2018, Yang-Ming University decided to give priority to negotiations with Chiao Tung University, and the two institutions established a joint merger committee. In March 2019, the university councils of both institutions approved a new letter of intent to merge.

On 18 September 2019, the university councils of Yang-Ming and Chiao Tung approved the proposed merger by votes of 65–20 and 59–15, respectively. University officials said the merger would provide additional opportunities for interdisciplinary education and research, including investment in bioelectronics, bioinformatics, and digital biomedicine. The Ministry of Education approved the merger proposal on 24 June 2020. In August 2020, the Executive Yuan and Ministry of Education gave their approval for the two universities to merge on 1 February 2021.

On 1 February 2021, Yang-Ming University and Chiao Tung University formally merged to establish National Yang Ming Chiao Tung University, with inauguration ceremonies held at the Yangming Campus in Taipei and the Guangfu Campus in Hsinchu. Before the merger, the combined institution was projected to have approximately 20,000 students, 1,400 faculty members, 19 colleges, six newly established research centers, and an affiliated hospital distributed across nine campuses.

Unveiling ceremony marking the university's establishment in February 2021

=== Development and expansion (2021–present) ===
In December 2021, NYCU inaugurated its Industry-Academia Innovation Research College, established to train specialists in advanced semiconductor technologies in partnership with TSMC and Foxconn. In August 2023, the Ministry of Education approved the establishment of a department of Chinese medicine at NYCU for the 2024 academic year.

In September 2024, NYCU consolidated the humanities and social sciences colleges of its Yangming and Chiaotung campuses into the College of Humanities, Arts, and Social Sciences. On 4 July 2025, the university inaugurated its Kaohsiung campus, founded with the Kaohsiung City Government to provide education and research in artificial intelligence.

== Campus ==
National Yang Ming Chiao Tung University operates campuses across Taiwan, with its two main campuses located in Beitou District, Taipei, and East District, Hsinchu. The university also maintains campuses in Zhubei, Tainan, and Kaohsiung, as well as academic facilities at other locations in Taipei and Hsinchu.

=== Yangming Campus ===
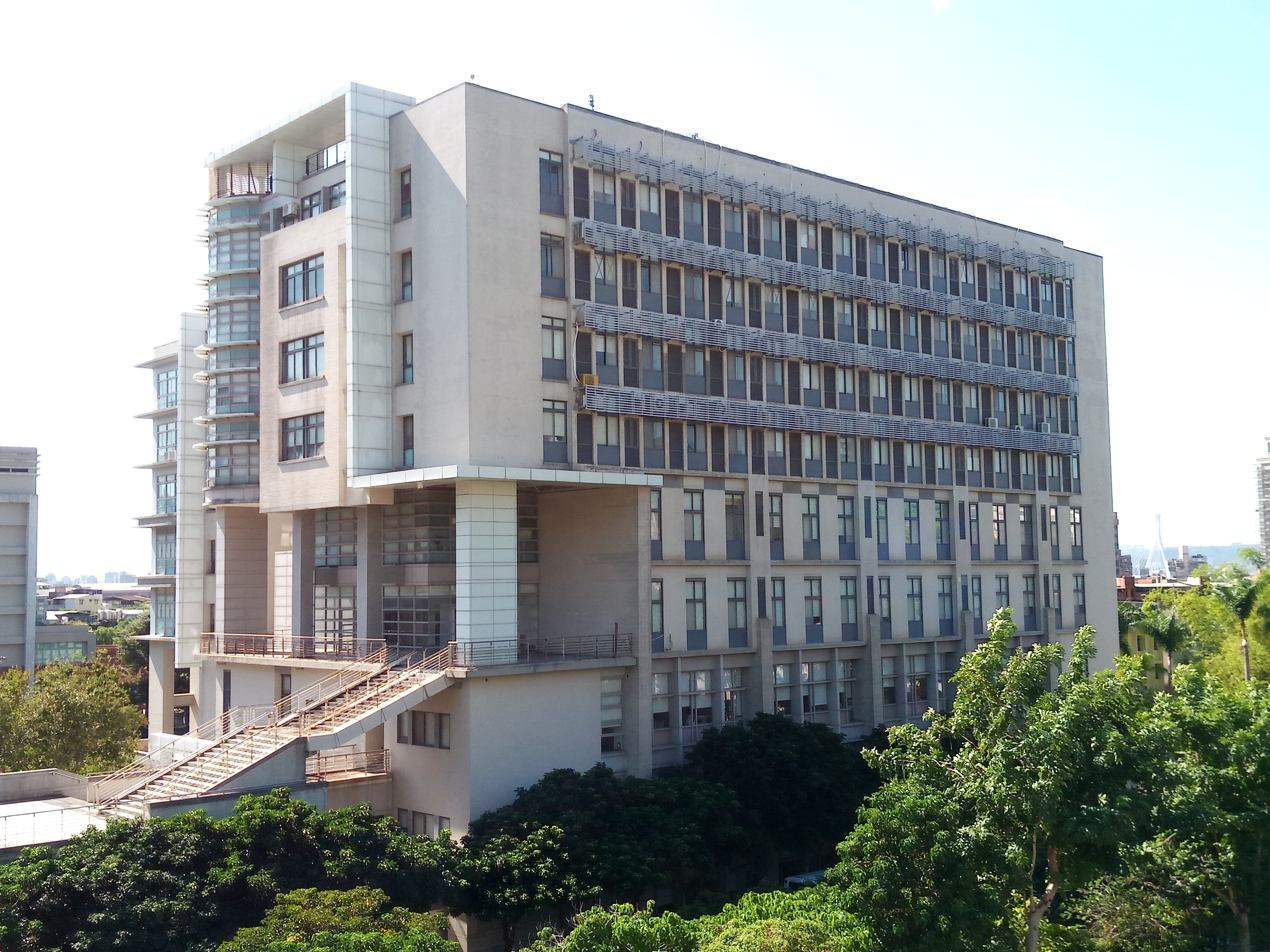
Library and Information and Research Building, Yangming Campus

The Yangming Campus (陽明校區) is located on Linong Street in Beitou District, Taipei, on the former grounds of National Yang-Ming University. The campus accommodates medical education and biomedical research facilities, with the nearby Taipei Veterans General Hospital serving as the primary teaching hospital of NYCU's School of Medicine.

The campus is built on hilly terrain, with pedestrian paths and stairways connecting its academic buildings to a sports ground situated at its highest point. Its library occupies the first three floors of the Library and Information and Research Building, which opened in May 2006 and has a total area of 8,687 square meters. The campus also contains eight student residence halls, including two completed in 2016 for graduate and international students.

=== Guangfu Campus ===
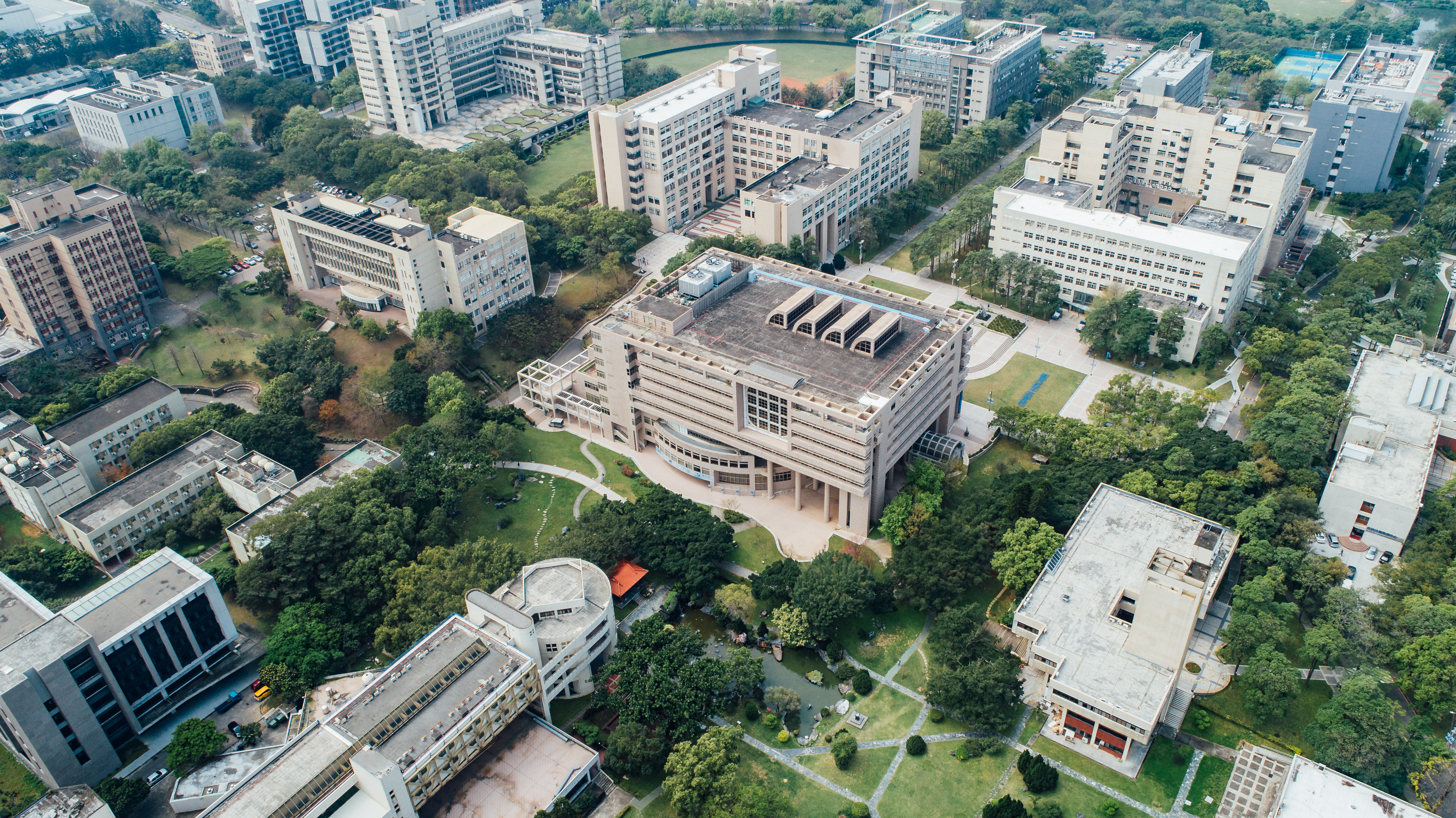
Aerial view of the Guangfu Campus

The Guangfu Campus (光復校區), located on Daxue Road in East District, Hsinchu, is the university's largest campus, covering approximately 62 hectares (153 acres). Development of the site began in 1978 as National Chiao Tung University expanded beyond its original Boai Campus. The campus contains science and engineering buildings, management facilities, administrative offices, student residences, and recreational facilities.

The campus's principal library building, opened in 1998, comprises eight above-ground floors and a basement, with a total floor area of approximately 32,068 square meters. Its interior contains Phoenix in Graceful Arrival (鳳凰來儀), a sculpture by Taiwanese artist Yuyu Yang. Among the campus's landscaped features is Bamboo Lake (竹湖), beside which stands the Bamboo Garden and Mirrored Pavilion, commemorating the contributions of alumnus Lee Tsi-mo. The campus has twelve student residence halls.

=== Other campuses ===
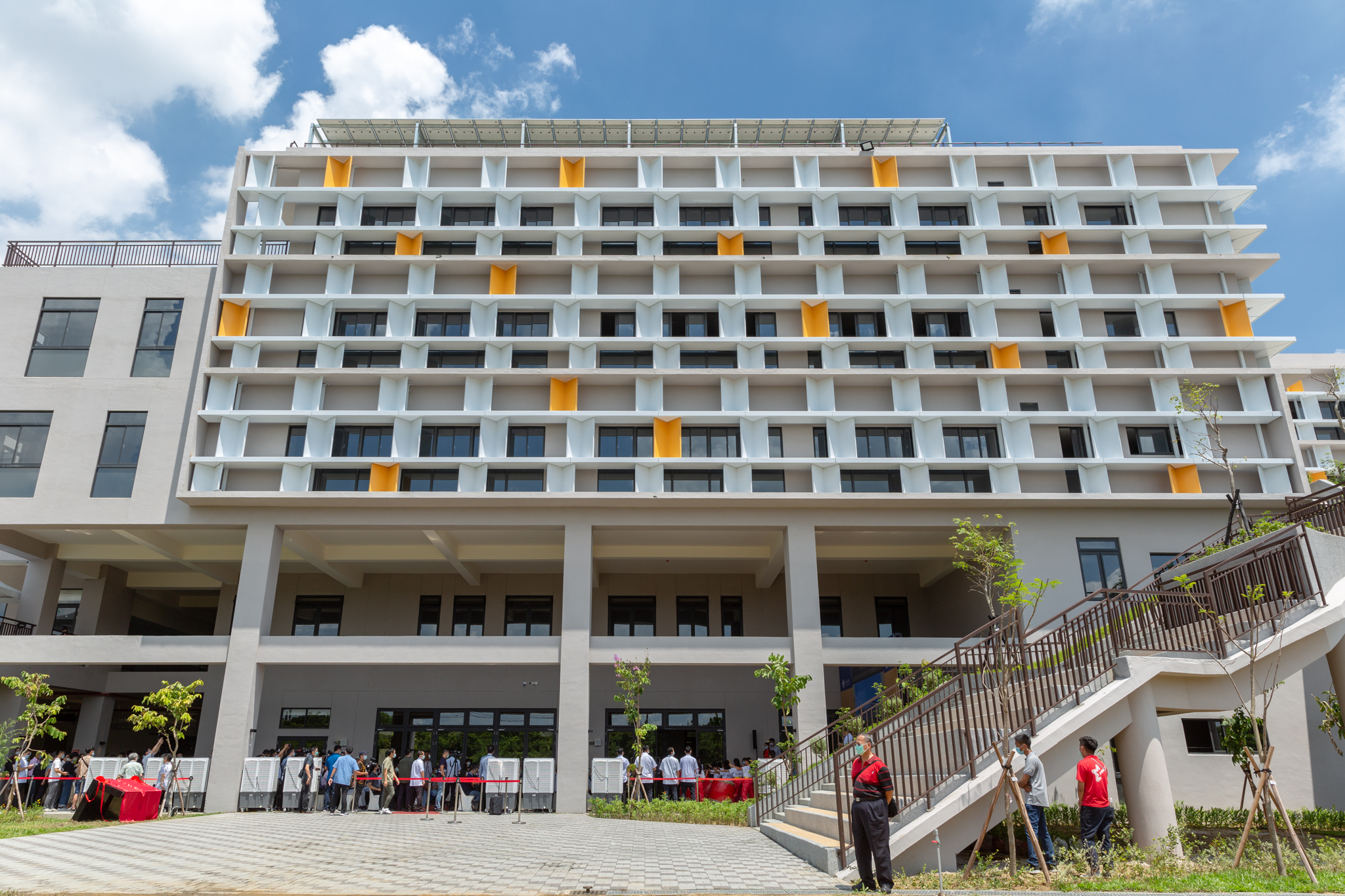
Zhiyuan Building on the university's Tainan Campus, completed in 2020

The Boai Campus (博愛校區), located on Boai Street in Hsinchu, occupies the original Taiwanese campus of National Chiao Tung University, which was reestablished there in 1958 with the founding of its Institute of Electronics. The campus houses biomedical research facilities, including the Hsien Chee Biomedical Engineering Building, completed in 2018, which contains research laboratories, teaching facilities, and a business incubator specializing in biomedical electronics.

The Liujia Campus (六家校區), situated in Zhubei, Hsinchu County, accommodates the university's College of Hakka Studies and its Department of Humanities and Social Sciences. The campus incorporates traditional Hakka architecture and is surrounded by historic buildings, including Wenli Hall (文禮堂).

Chimei Building at the Tainan Campus

In central Taipei, the Beimen Campus (北門校區) occupies part of the historic Taipei Post Office building in Zhongzheng District. It provides teaching and research space for the College of Management's graduate institutes of business management and transportation, along with executive MBA programs.

The Gueiren Campus (歸仁校區), also known as the Tainan Campus, is located in Guiren District, Tainan, within the Shalun Green Energy Science City development area. Established by National Chiao Tung University in 2009, the campus accommodates the College of Photonics and College of Artificial Intelligence, with facilities including the Chimei Building.

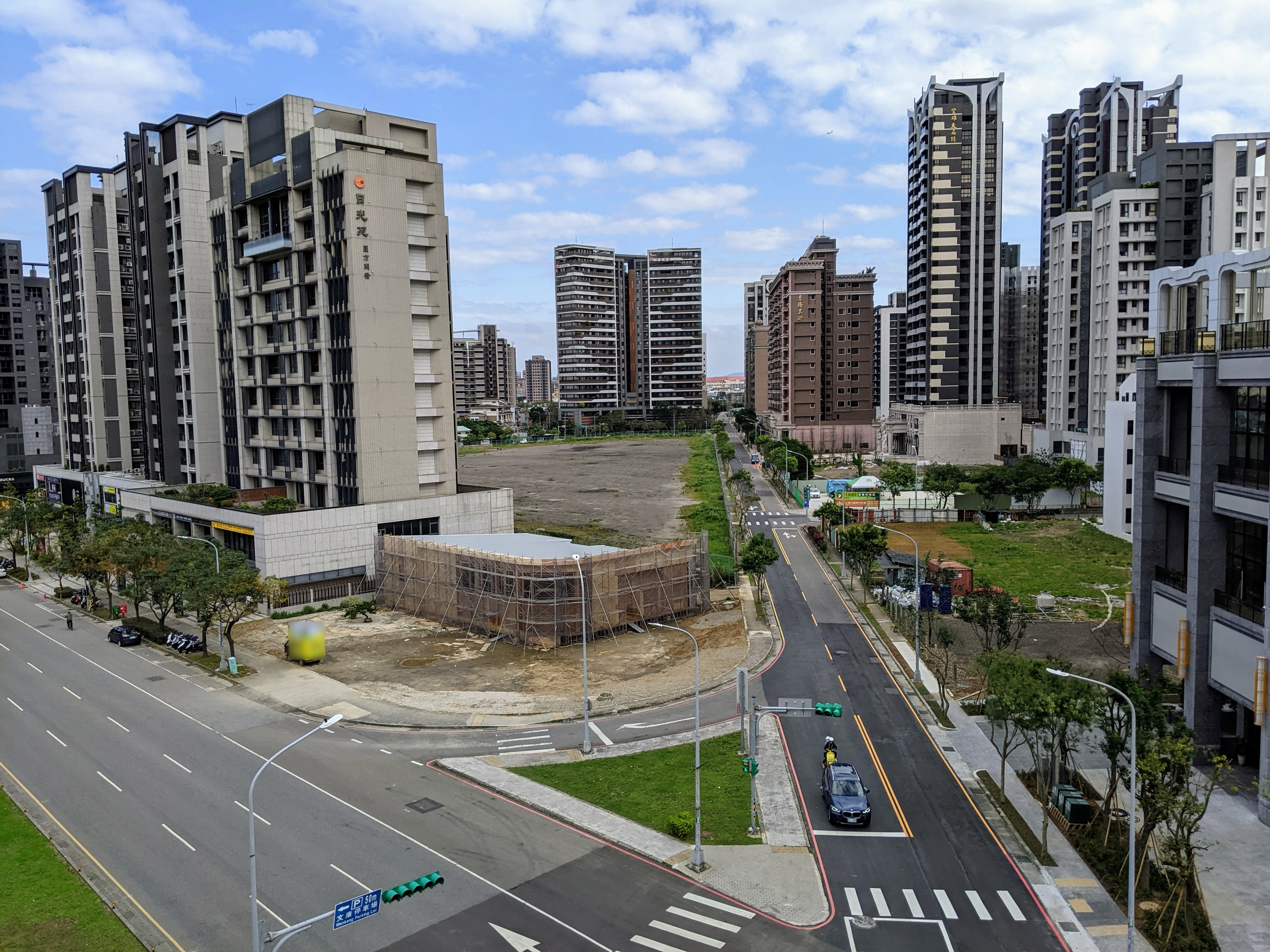
NYCU Taoyuan Campus under construction in 2022

In Yilan City, the university operates its affiliated hospital at the Lanyang Campus (蘭陽校區), which serves as a clinical teaching facility for the School of Medicine. The hospital also maintains facilities in the Xinmin district of Yilan City.

On 4 July 2025, NYCU inaugurated its Kaohsiung Campus (高雄校區) in Zuoying District, Kaohsiung, to offer academic programs and industry-oriented training in semiconductor technology and artificial intelligence. The campus occupies the former Lotus Pond Guest House and Civil Service Development Center, which were provided to the university by the Kaohsiung City Government.

The university operates shuttle bus services connecting its Yangming and Guangfu campuses, as well as routes linking Guangfu with the Boai and Liujia campuses.

=== Affiliated senior high school ===
In December 2023, NYCU invited National Chu Pei Senior High School to become an affiliated senior high school of the university. On April 29 of that year, the two institutions signed a memorandum of understanding (MOU) on the school's affiliation. The MOU and the affiliation assessment report were submitted to the Ministry of Education for review. On September 1, 2025, National Chu Pei Senior High School was officially reorganized and renamed the Affiliated Chu Pei Senior High School of National Yang Ming Chiao Tung University.

== Academics ==
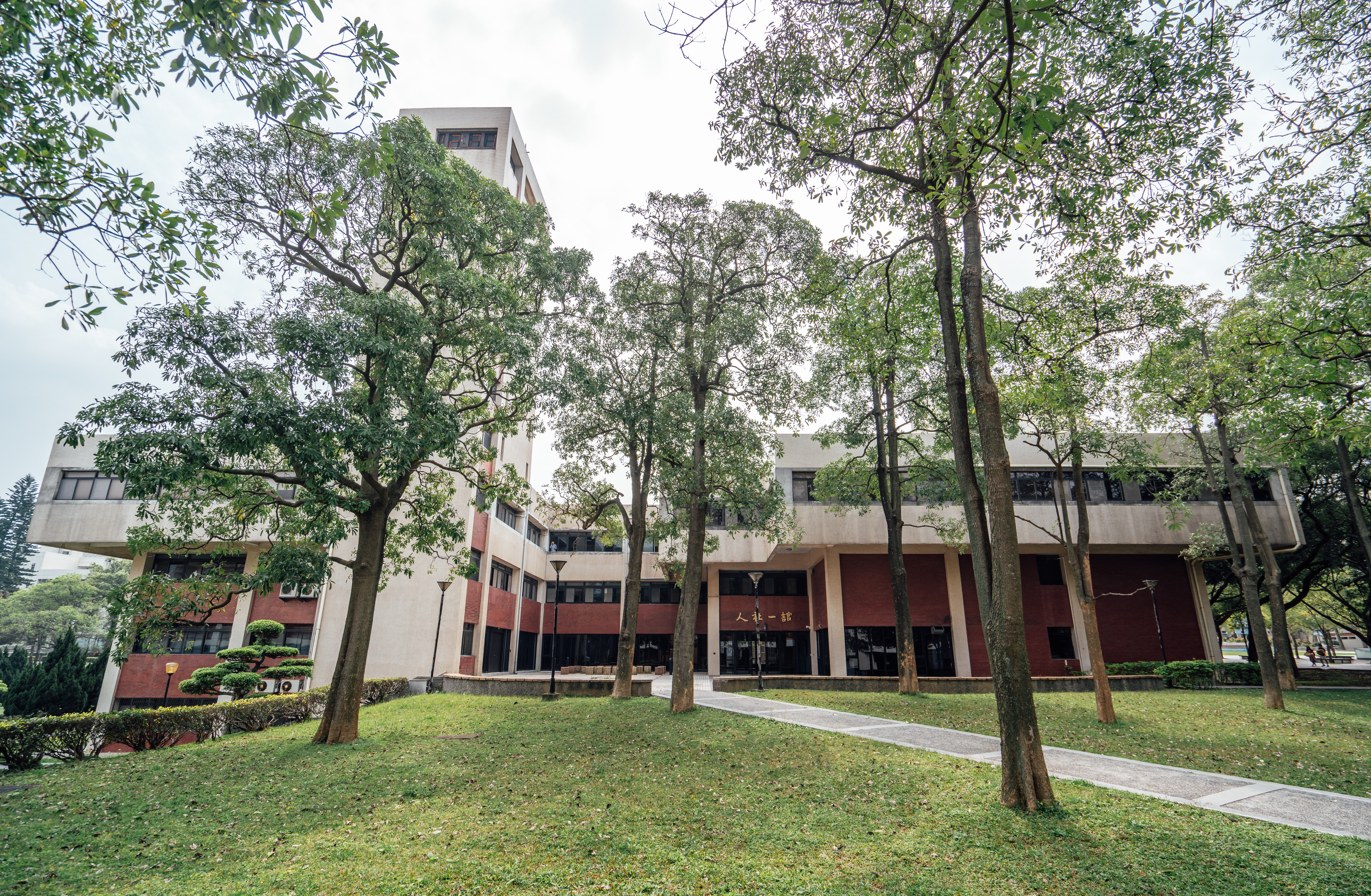
Humanities and Social Sciences Building I at the Guangfu Campus

National Yang Ming Chiao Tung University is organized into 19 colleges, offering undergraduate and graduate education in the natural sciences, engineering, medicine, humanities, social sciences, and professional disciplines. Its academic units include the colleges of science, engineering, electrical and computer engineering, computer science, life sciences, engineering bioscience, photonics, and artificial intelligence. The university also maintains colleges of medicine, dentistry, nursing, pharmaceutical sciences, biomedical science and engineering, management, Hakka studies, and humanities, arts and social sciences, as well as a School of Law and an International College of Semiconductor Technology. NYCU awards bachelor's, master's, and doctoral degrees, in addition to professional degrees in medicine, dentistry, and business administration.

=== Undergraduate education ===
Humanities and Social Sciences Building II at the Guangfu Campus, 2019

Undergraduate students complete general education coursework coordinated by the university's Liberal Arts College (博雅書苑), which provides an 18-credit core curriculum covering foundational literacy, the humanities, social sciences, and technology. The college also coordinates arts education, experiential learning, and community-oriented educational activities.

In addition to academic majors and minors, the university offers cross-disciplinary programs through which students combine their principal fields of study with courses from other departments. Its cross-disciplinary specialization generally requires approximately 30 credits and is recorded on the student's degree certificate upon completion. Students may also pursue smaller micro-programs of 8–12 credits or credit programs requiring at least 12 credits. The university's Arete Honors Program (百川學士學位學程) offers a four-year undergraduate curriculum in which students pursue individualized and interdisciplinary study rather than following a conventional curriculum.

=== Graduate and professional education ===
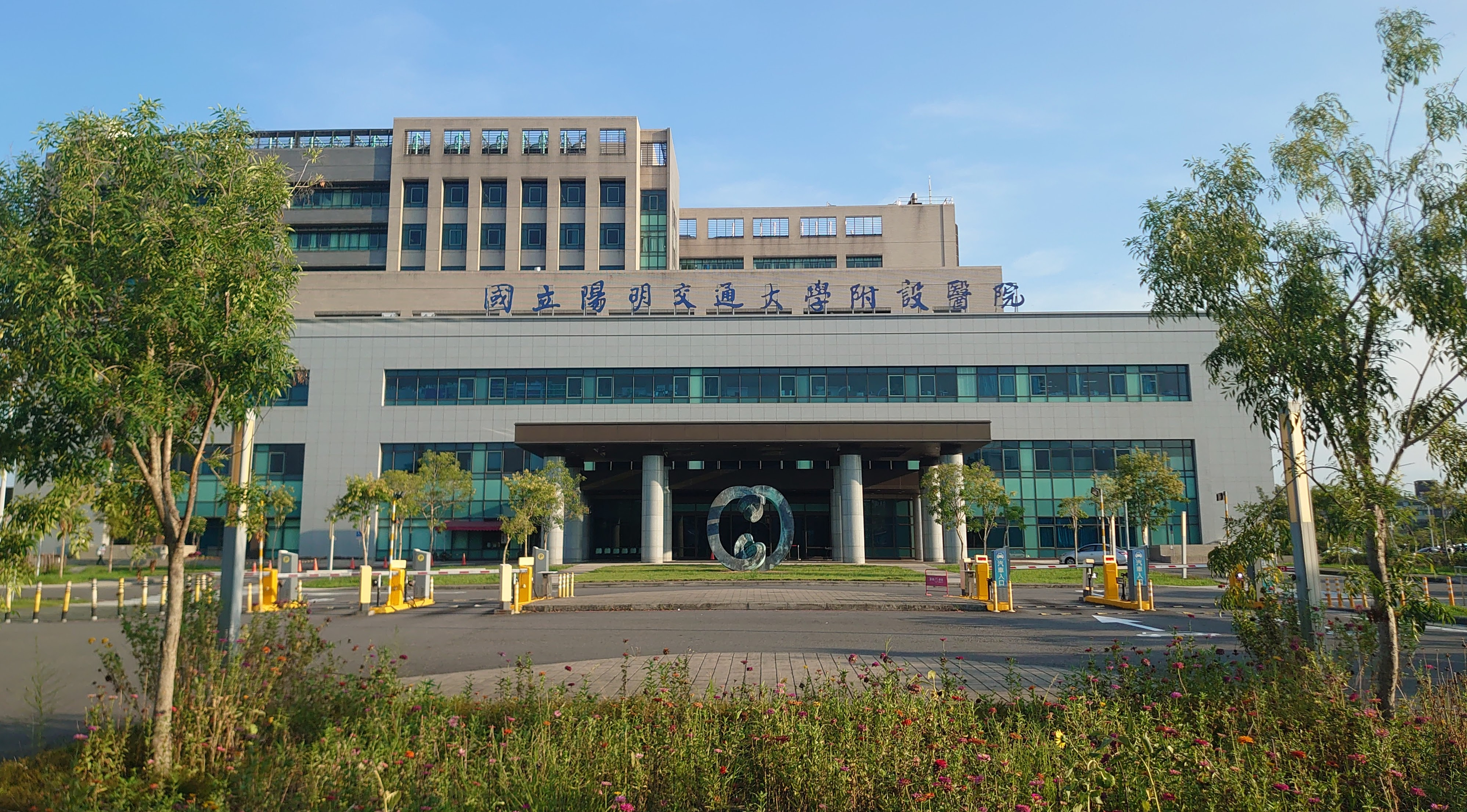
National Yang Ming Chiao Tung University Hospital in Yilan

NYCU offers master's and doctoral programs through its colleges and graduate institutes, including programs in semiconductor technology, artificial intelligence, biomedical engineering, neuroscience, public health, management, and the humanities and social sciences. Among its interdisciplinary graduate offerings are programs in biomedical informatics, bioinformatics and systems biology, molecular medicine, and biophotonics. The university also participates in the International Graduate Program in Photonics, a doctoral program offered through the University System of Taiwan.

The College of Medicine provides medical education and clinical training in cooperation with Taipei Veterans General Hospital, which serves as the School of Medicine's primary teaching hospital. The College of Dentistry offers a professional Doctor of Dental Surgery (DDS) degree alongside graduate programs in dentistry, oral biology, and oral tissue engineering and biomaterials. The College of Medicine also offers a degree program in Chinese medicine, alongside graduate programs in traditional medicine.

The School of Law offers graduate legal education, including international Master of Laws (LLM) and doctoral programs. Its areas of study include intellectual property law, business law and corporate governance, biotechnology and medical law, transnational law, and information and competition law.

NYCU's Industry Academia Innovation School, established in 2021, consists of the Institute of Pioneer Semiconductor Innovation and the Institute of Artificial Intelligence Innovation. The school conducts teaching and research in collaboration with technology companies including TSMC, Foxconn, Wistron, and MediaTek. Its semiconductor institute includes research groups in nanodevices and semiconductor processes, as well as chip design and electronic design automation.

=== Research ===
Engineering Building 6 on the Guangfu Campus

NYCU conducts research in semiconductor technology, artificial intelligence, communications, biomedical sciences, public health, and the humanities. Among its research institutions are the Microelectronics and Information Research Center, System on Chip Research Center, Brain Research Center, Cancer and Immunology Research Center, and Digital Medicine and Smart Healthcare Research Center. The university also maintains joint research centers with industrial partners, including TSMC, ITRI, Chunghwa Telecom, and Quanta Computer.

Its biomedical research facilities include centers specializing in medical device innovation, cancer and immunology, brain research, and assistive technology. Research centers in engineering and physical sciences include the Center for Nano Science and Technology, and Center for Theoretical and Computational Physics. Research in the humanities and social sciences is conducted through institutions including the Research Center for Humanities and Social Sciences and the International Center for Cultural Studies.

==== Advanced Rocket Research Center (ARRC) ====
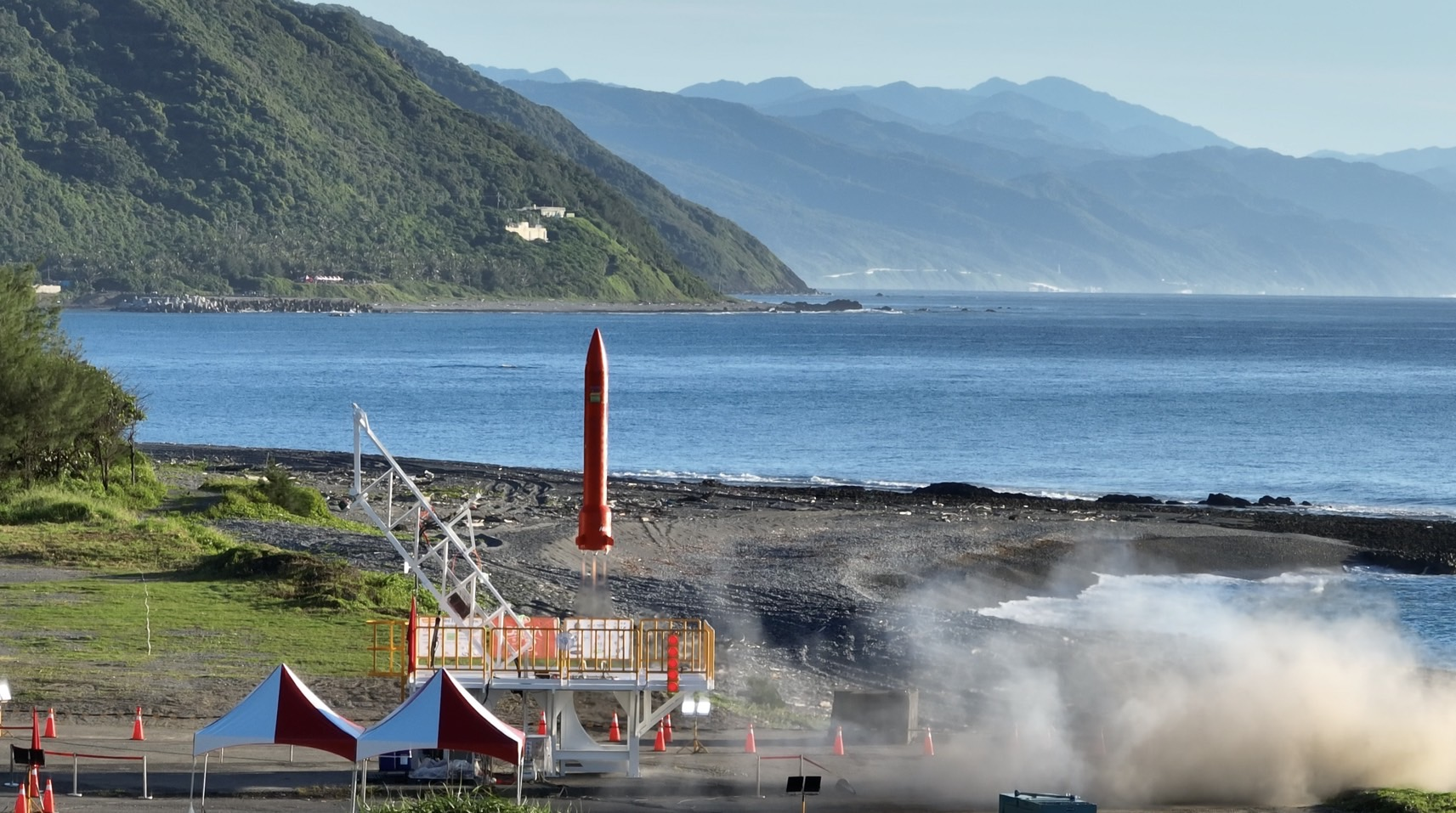
The first flight test of HTTP-3A rocket, Xuhai short-term sounding rocket launch site

The Advanced Rocket Research Center (ARRC; Chinese: 前瞻火箭研究中心; Tongyong Pinyin: Ciánjhān Huǒjiàn Yánjiòu Jhōngsīn; Tâi-lô: Tsiân-tsiam Hué-tshinn Gián-kiù Tiong-sim) is a Taiwanese space transport research organization headquartered at National Yang Ming Chiao Tung University in Hsinchu City, Taiwan, with a research focus in hybrid rockets. Founded in April 2012, ARRC is supported by research grants and private donors through crowdsourcing platforms.

=== Associated institutions ===
NYCU is a member of the University System of Taiwan, an academic consortium that also includes National Tsing Hua University, National Central University, and National Chengchi University. The consortium facilitates cooperation in teaching, research, and academic resource sharing between its four member universities. Under the system, undergraduate students may apply to pursue a second major at another member institution, subject to approval by both universities. The system also permits undergraduate student exchanges between member universities.

The university operates National Yang Ming Chiao Tung University Hospital in Yilan City, which serves as a teaching hospital for its medical students. The School of Medicine also offers clinical elective placements at Taipei Veterans General Hospital for eligible students from international partner institutions.

=== Library system ===
Hao-Ran Library and Information Center at the Guangfu Campus

The National Yang Ming Chiao Tung University Library operates its main libraries at the Guangfu Campus in Hsinchu and the Yangming Campus in Taipei. The Guangfu Campus library opened in 1998 and occupies an eight-story building with a basement and a total floor area of approximately 32,068 square meters. The Yangming Campus library, opened in May 2006, occupies the first three floors of the Library and Information and Research Building and has a total area of 8,687 square meters. Through its participation in the University System of Taiwan, the library also provides eligible users with interlibrary borrowing services from National Tsing Hua University, National Central University, and National Chengchi University.

== Student body and admissions ==
Student enrollment (2025–2026)
Student category	Number
Undergraduate	8,914
Master's	10,886
Doctoral	2,721
Total	22,521

In the 2025–2026 academic year, National Yang Ming Chiao Tung University enrolled 22,521 students: 8,914 undergraduates, 10,886 master's students, and 2,721 doctoral students. According to the Ministry of Education, the student body included 1,315 overseas degree-seeking students and 151 Indigenous Taiwanese students. In October 2022, the university reported that 64.1% of its students were male and 35.9% were female, with similar proportions among undergraduates, master's students, and doctoral students.

Admission to NYCU's undergraduate programs is conducted through several ways, including personal application (申請入學), the Stars Program (繁星推薦), and examination and placement (分發入學). Under the Stars Program, applicants are evaluated using criteria that include their high school academic ranking and scores on the General Scholastic Ability Test (GSAT), with requirements varying by academic department. In the personal application pathway, departments may consider GSAT scores, academic records, application portfolios, interviews, and written examinations. The university also admits transfer students through a separate admissions process.

NYCU maintains a special undergraduate admissions track known as Tunmeng (屯蒙), intended for applicants from economically or socially disadvantaged backgrounds. For the 2026 academic year, eligible applicants included students from low-income households, students with disabilities, children of parents with disabilities, Indigenous students, and new immigrants or their children. The program provided nine admissions groups covering disciplines including engineering, computer science, medicine, dentistry, management, and the humanities and social sciences.

== Student life ==
=== Student organizations ===
Dining Hall 2 at the Guangfu Campus

The university has more than 150 student clubs and organizations. They include clubs devoted to astronomy, photography, board games, animation, calligraphy, cybersecurity, and computer programming. The university's Office of Student Affairs oversees the establishment and administration of student clubs, which are classified into categories including academic, artistic, recreational, service-oriented, and athletic organizations.

International student organizations include the NYCU International Student Association, Overseas Chinese Student Association, Muslim Student Club, and associations representing students from Vietnam, Indonesia, India, and Thailand.

=== Student housing ===
Dormitory 13 at the Guangfu Campus

NYCU operates university-managed student residences at its Yangming, Guangfu, Boai, and Tainan campuses. The Yangming Campus in Taipei has eight residence halls, including the men's and women's Fifth Houses, which were completed in 2016 to accommodate graduate and international students. The Guangfu Campus in Hsinchu has twelve residence halls, while the Boai and Tainan campuses have six and one, respectively.

The Yangming Campus provides residential counseling services in its First and Fifth Houses. The university's residential management system also includes elected dormitory heads and resident assistants who participate in dormitory administration and student guidance.

=== Traditions and athletics ===
The athletic field and running track at the Guangfu Campus

The university's traditions include the Mei-Chu Games (梅竹賽), an annual intercollegiate competition with neighboring National Tsing Hua University in Hsinchu. The competition originated in 1969 as a sporting rivalry between National Chiao Tung University and National Tsing Hua University, and continued after Chiao Tung merged with Yang-Ming University in 2021. The name derives from the Chinese characters mei (梅, plum blossom), representing Tsing Hua University, and chu (竹, bamboo), representing Chiao Tung University.

The university's Physical Education Office maintains sports facilities including gymnasiums, tennis courts, basketball and volleyball courts, athletic tracks, and swimming pools. University sporting activities include track-and-field and swimming competitions, interdepartmental tournaments, and road races.

== Rankings and reputation ==
University rankings

Global – Overall
- ARWU World: 401–500 (2026)
- QS World: 177 (2027)
- THE World: 401–450 (2027)

Regional – Overall
- THE Asia: 81 (2026)

National Yang Ming Chiao Tung University was ranked joint 177th worldwide in the 2027 QS World University Rankings. In the 2027 Times Higher Education World University Rankings, the university was placed in the 401–450 band worldwide. The 2026 Academic Ranking of World Universities (ARWU), published by ShanghaiRanking Consultancy, placed NYCU in the 401–500 band globally. In the 2026 Times Higher Education Asia University Rankings, the university was ranked 81st in Asia.

In ShanghaiRanking's 2026 Global Ranking of Academic Subjects, NYCU had 20 subjects ranked, including nursing in the 51–75 band and instruments science and technology in the 101–150 band worldwide. Telecommunication engineering and nanoscience and nanotechnology were both placed in the 151–200 band, while computer science and engineering, materials science and engineering, biotechnology, and dentistry and oral sciences were ranked in the 201–300 band. In the 2026 Times Higher Education subject rankings, NYCU was ranked 201–250 worldwide in education studies, 251–300 in engineering, and 301–400 in both computer science and medical and health studies.

In the 2026 Times Higher Education Interdisciplinary Science Rankings, NYCU was ranked 74th worldwide and third in Taiwan, rising from 147th worldwide in the preceding edition. The Nature Index's 2026 Research Leaders rankings, based on research articles published in 2025, placed NYCU third among Taiwanese academic institutions by research output share, recording 244 articles in its selected journals.

NYCU was ranked joint 49th worldwide in the 2026 Times Higher Education Sustainability Impact Ratings, which assess universities against the Sustainable Development Goals (SDGs). In the same assessment, the university was ranked 17th worldwide for SDG 3 (Good Health and Well-being), joint 26th for SDG 9 (Industry, Innovation and Infrastructure), and 39th for SDG 7 (Affordable and Clean Energy).

== Notable people ==
=== Faculty ===
The university's faculty have included electrical engineer Simon Sze (1936–2023), who was an honorary chair professor until his death. Other faculty members in electrical engineering and computer science include Ray-Hua Horng, an electrical engineer specializing in optoelectronic devices and semiconductor technologies, and Lin Yi-bing, a computer scientist and former deputy minister of science and technology whose research focuses on mobile communications and computing.

In the physical sciences, Yuan-Pern Lee has been a professor in NYCU's Department of Applied Chemistry. In medicine and public health, Kung-Yee Liang, a biostatistician and former president of National Yang-Ming University, has held an adjunct professorship at NYCU's College of Medicine. Faculty in the humanities and social sciences include Joyce C. H. Liu, a cultural studies scholar and professor emerita who has directed the university's International Center for Cultural Studies, with research focusing on geopolitics, coloniality, and Asian modernity. Art historian Jui-Chʻi Liu, whose research includes feminist art history and the history of photography, has served as a professor at NYCU's Institute of Visual Studies.

Chenming Hu, a lifetime chair professor at NYCU, is known for helping to invent the Fin field-effect transistor. Mau-Chung Frank Chang, a doctoral alumnus and former NCTU president, contributed to the development and commercialization of heterojunction bipolar transistor technology for wireless communications. Alice Chien Chang, a former professor at National Yang-Ming University, co-authored the 1976 study that purified and characterized Taq polymerase, an enzyme used in the polymerase chain reaction (PCR).

== See also ==
- List of universities in Taiwan
- Education in Taiwan
