= Hoshino =

Hoshino (written: 星野 lit. "star field") is a Japanese surname. It may refer to:

== Companies ==
- Hoshino Resorts
- Hoshino Gakki, musical instrument manufacturing company

== People ==
- Aki Hoshino (ほしの あき; born 1977), Japanese bikini idol
- Ayaka Hoshino (星野 綾香; born 1977), Japanese AV idol
- Fumiaki Hoshino (星野 文昭), Japanese political prisoner
- Gen Hoshino (星野 源; born 1981), Japanese singer-songwriter, musician, and actor
- Hidehiko Hoshino (星野 英彦; born 1966), Japanese musician, singer and songwriter
- Hidemasa Hoshino (星野 英正; born 1977), Japanese golfer
- Hisashi Hoshino (星野 恒; 1839–1917), Japanese historian and sinologist
- Ikuma Hoshino (星野 育蒔; born 1981), Japanese retired female mixed martial arts fighter and judoka
- Junji Hoshino (星野 順治; born 1974), Japanese baseball player
- Junko Hoshino (星野 純子; born 1989), Japanese skier
- Kanako Hoshino (星野 奏子; born 1979), Japanese singer
- Kankuro Hoshino (星野 勘九郎; born 1975), Japanese professional wrestler
- Kantarou Hoshino (星野 勘太郎; 1943-2010), Japanese wrestler
- Kaoru Hoshino (星野 薫; 1947–2022), Japanese racing driver
- Katsura Hoshino (星野 桂; born 1980), Japanese manga artist
- Kayo Hoshino (星野 賀代; born 1972), Japanese former volleyball player
- Kayoko Hoshino (星野 佳代子; born 1949), Japanese ceramicist
- Kazuyoshi Hoshino (星野 一義; born 1947), Japanese former racing driver and businessman
- Kazuki Hoshino (星野 一樹; born 1977), Japanese racing driver
- Keitaro Hoshino (星野 敬太郎; 1969–2021), Japanese boxer
- Kōichirō Hoshino (星野 倖一郎; born 1974), Japanese manga artist
- Kota Hoshino (星野 康太; born 1975), Japanese composer and sound designer
- Lily Hoshino (星野 リリィ; born 1978), Japanese manga artist
- Mari Hoshino (星野 真里; born 1981), Japanese actress and singer
- Masaki Hoshino (星野 正樹; 1967–2019), Japanese professional Go player
- Masumi Hoshino (星野 真澄; born 1984), Japanese former professional baseball pitcher
- Michio Hoshino (星野 道夫; 1952–1996), Japanese photographer
- Mika Hoshino (星野 美香; born 1965), Japanese table tennis player
- Minami Hoshino (星野 みなみ; born 1998), Japanese member of the Nogizaka46
- Mitsuaki Hoshino (星野 充昭; born 1959), Japanese actor and voice actor
- Naoki Hoshino (星野 直樹; 1892–1978), Japanese bureaucrat and politician
- Nobuya Hoshino (星野 展弥; 1937–2020), Japanese table tennis player
- Nobuyuki Hoshino (星野 伸之; born 1966), Japanese baseball player
- Osamu Hoshino (星野 おさむ; born 1970), Japanese baseball player
- Renato Hoshino (星野 レナート; 1943-2010), Japanese logistic and racing driver - Brasil
- Rikuya Hoshino (星野 陸也; born 1996), Japanese professional golfer
- Satoru Hoshino (星野 悟; born 1989), Japanese football player
- Senichi Hoshino (星野 仙一; 1947–2018), Japanese baseball player and manager
- Shingo Hoshino (星野 真悟; born 1978), Japanese former football player
- Shuhei Hoshino (星野 秀平; born 1995), Japanese professional footballer
- Tadashi Hoshino (星野 直志; born 1980), Japanese paralympic athlete
- Takanori Hoshino (星野 貴紀; born 1980), Japanese voice actor
- Tatsuko Hoshino (星野 立子; 1903–1984), Japanese haiku poet
- Tenchi Hoshino (星野 天知; 1862-1950), Japanese noted poet, educator, calligrapher, and martial arts master
- Tetsurou Hoshino (星野 哲郎; 1925-2010), Japanese lyricist
- Tomihiro Hoshino (星野 富弘; 1946-2024), Japanese poet and painter
- Tomoki Hoshino (星野 智樹; born 1977), Japanese professional Nippon Professional Baseball player
- Tomoko Hoshino (星野 知子; born 1957), Japanese actress and essayist
- Tomoyuki Hoshino (星野 智幸; born 1965), Japanese writer
- Tsuyoshi Hoshino (星野 剛士; born 1963), Japanese politician
- Yachiho Hoshino (星野 八千穂; born 1980), Japanese baseball player
- Yoshio Hoshino (星野 好男; born 1950), Japanese ice hockey player
- Yoshitaka Hoshino (星野 良生; born 1988), Japanese shogi player
- Yukinobu Hoshino (星野 之宣; born 1954), Japanese manga artist
- Yusuke Hoshino (星野 有亮; born 1992), Japanese former football player
- Yuzou Hoshino (星野 勇三; 1875-1964), Japanese agronomist

=== Fictional characters ===
- Hoshino Takanashi (小鳥遊 ホシノ), a character from Blue Archive
- Ai Hoshino (星野 アイ) a character from Oshi no Ko
- Ruby Hoshino (星野 瑠美衣) a character from Oshi no Ko. Daughter of the idol Ai Hoshino and a twin sister of Aquamarine Hoshino.
- Aquamarine Hoshino (星野 愛久愛海) a character from Oshi no Ko. Son of the idol Ai Hoshino and a twin brother of Ruby Hoshino.
- Goro Hoshino (星野 吾郎) a character from Choriki Sentai Ohranger
- Ichika Hoshino (星乃 一歌) a character from Hatsune Miku: Colorful Stage!
- Kenta Hoshino (ホシノケンタ), a character from Futari wa Pretty Cure Splash Star
- Ruri Hoshino (星野 ルリ) a character from Martian Successor Nadesico
- Miyako Hoshino (星野 みやこ) a character from Watashi ni Tenshi ga Maiorita!
- Kaoru Hoshino (星野 薫) a character from Kageki Shojo!!
- Kozo Hoshino (星野 好造) a character from Initial D Fourth Stage, commonly also known as "God Foot"

== Other ==
- Hoshino, Fukuoka, a former village located in Fukuoka Prefecture
- 3828 Hoshino, main-belt asteroid
