= Aichi Gakuin University =

Private university in Japan

- 愛知学院大学
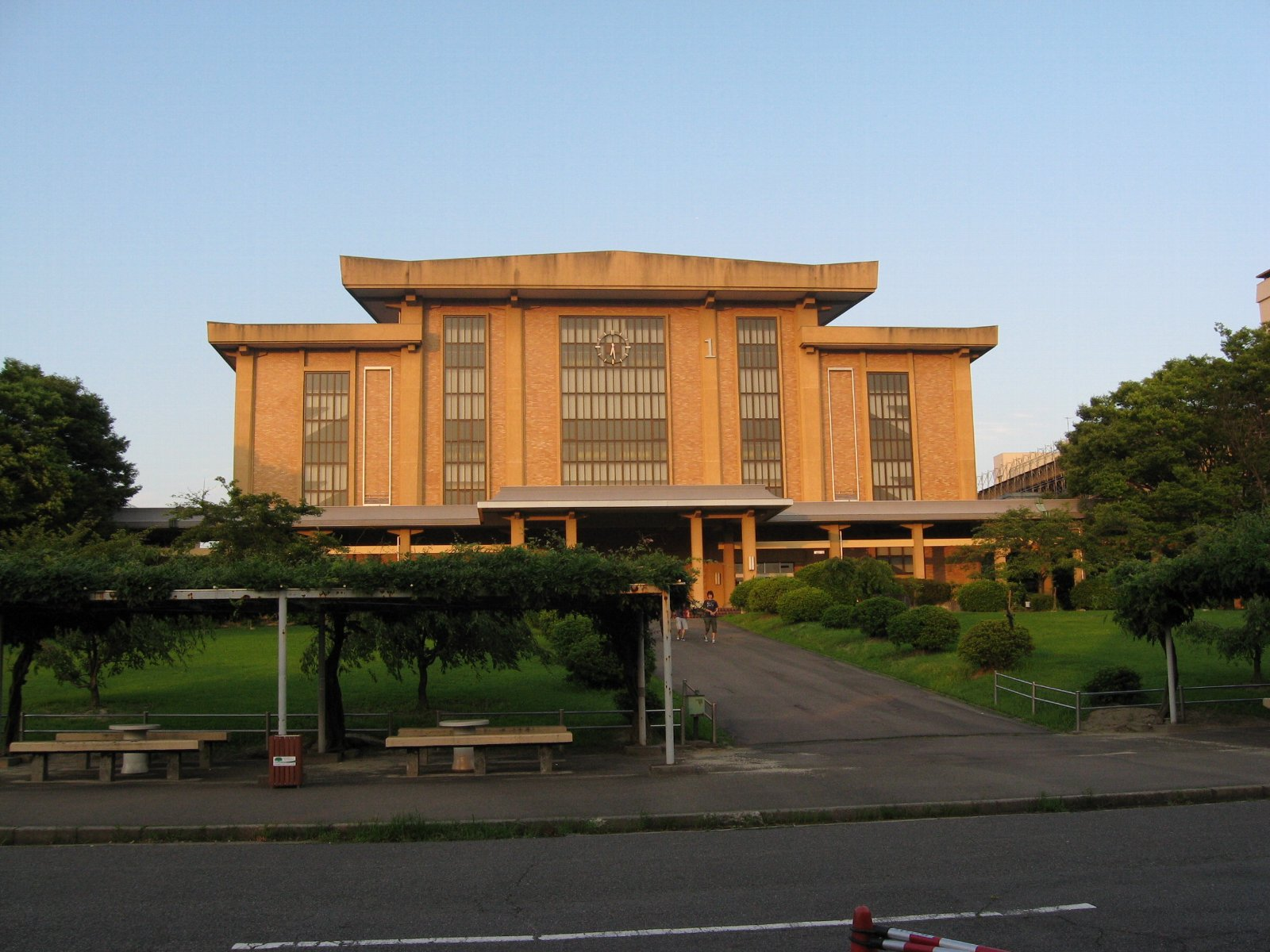
- Aichi Gakuin University in Nisshin
- Other names: AGU あいぐ
- Type: Private
- Established: 1876
- Academic staff: 513
- Students: c.12,000
- Undergraduates: 11,424
- Location: Nisshin, Aichi; Chikusa-ku, Nagoya, Japan; 35.162°N 137.047°E (Nisshin campus)
- Campus: Multiple campuses
- Website: www.agu.ac.jp/english/index.html

Aichi Gakuin University (愛知学院大学, Aichi gakuin daigaku) is a private university in Aichi Prefecture, Japan. It has campuses at the city of Nisshin, Aichi, Chikusa-ku, Nagoya and Meijō Park in Nagoya. The predecessor of the university, a Soto Zen college, was founded in 1876, and it was chartered as a university in 1953.

== History ==
The university began as a Soto Zen school in 1876, and retains strong connections to Soto Zen. In 1903 in accordance with revisions to education regulations, it was renamed the Sotozen No. 3 middle school. In 1925 it was renamed the Aichi middle school. In 1948 it was reformed as a high school, and in 1950 it became Aichi Gakuin Junior College. In 1953 it was finally established as Aichi Gakuin University. Over the next two decades it added the Faculty of Law, the School of Dentistry (including Aichi Gakuin Dental Hospital), the Faculty of Commerce, and the Faculty of Letters. In 1974 it opened its Nisshin Campus.

It began offering masters and doctoral courses in 1974 and 1976, initially in religious studies and psychology, expanding to all subjects over the next few years. In the 1980s it created departments of Japanese Culture and International Culture (the latter now the Department of English Language and Cultures). In the 1990s, it oversaw the creation of the graduate School of Business, and graduate studies in Japanese Culture and English Language.

In 2002, the graduate School of Policy open. A satellite campus opened in Sakae in central Nagoya in 2003, with the graduate schools of Commerce and Management and of Law moving there. The School of Pharmacy Science was opened in 2005, with graduate studies beginning six years later. A new Department of Global English was established in 2007.

In 2013, the Faculty of Economics was established, while in 2014, the new Meijo Campus next to Meijo Park in Nagoya was opened, housing the faculties of Business, Commerce, and Economics.

== Faculties and departments ==
The university currently consists of the following faculties and other divisions:

- Faculty of Letters (文学部)
  - Department of History (歴史学科)
  - Department of English Language and Cultures (英語英米文化学科)
  - Department of Global English (グローバル英語学科)
  - Department of Japanese Culture (日本文化学科)
  - Department of Religious Culture (宗教文化学科)
- Faculty of Psychological and Physical Science (心身科学部)
  - Department of Psychology (心理学科)
  - Department of Health Science (健康科学科)
  - Department of Health and Nutrition (健康栄養学科)
- Faculty of Business and Commerce (商学部)
  - Department of Business and Commerce (商学科)

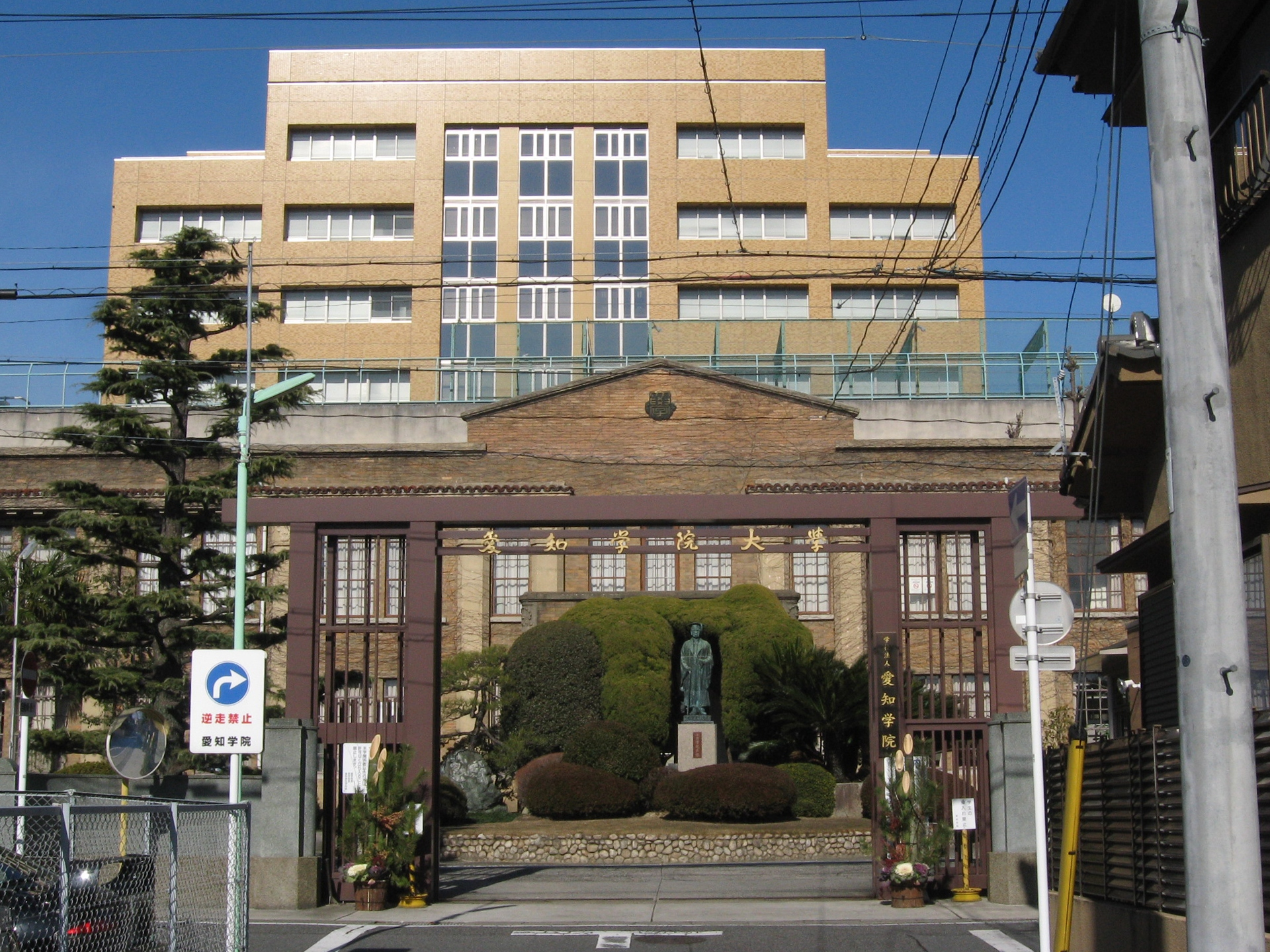
Aichi Gakuin Kusumoto Main Gate

- Faculty of Management (経営学部)
  - Department of Management (経営学科)
- Faculty of Economics (経済学部)
  - Department of Economics (経済学科)
- Faculty of Law (法学部)
  - Department of Law (法律学科)
  - Department of Law and Contemporary Society (現代社会法学科)
- Faculty of Policy Studies (総合政策学部)
  - Department of Policy Studies (総合政策学科)
- School of Pharmacy (薬学部)
  - Department of Pharmacy (医療薬学科)
- School of Dentistry (歯学部)
  - Department of Dentistry (歯学科)
- Junior College (短期大学部)
  - Department of Dental Hygiene (歯科衛生学科)
- Division of Liberal Arts and Sciences (教養部)

== National and international partner universities ==
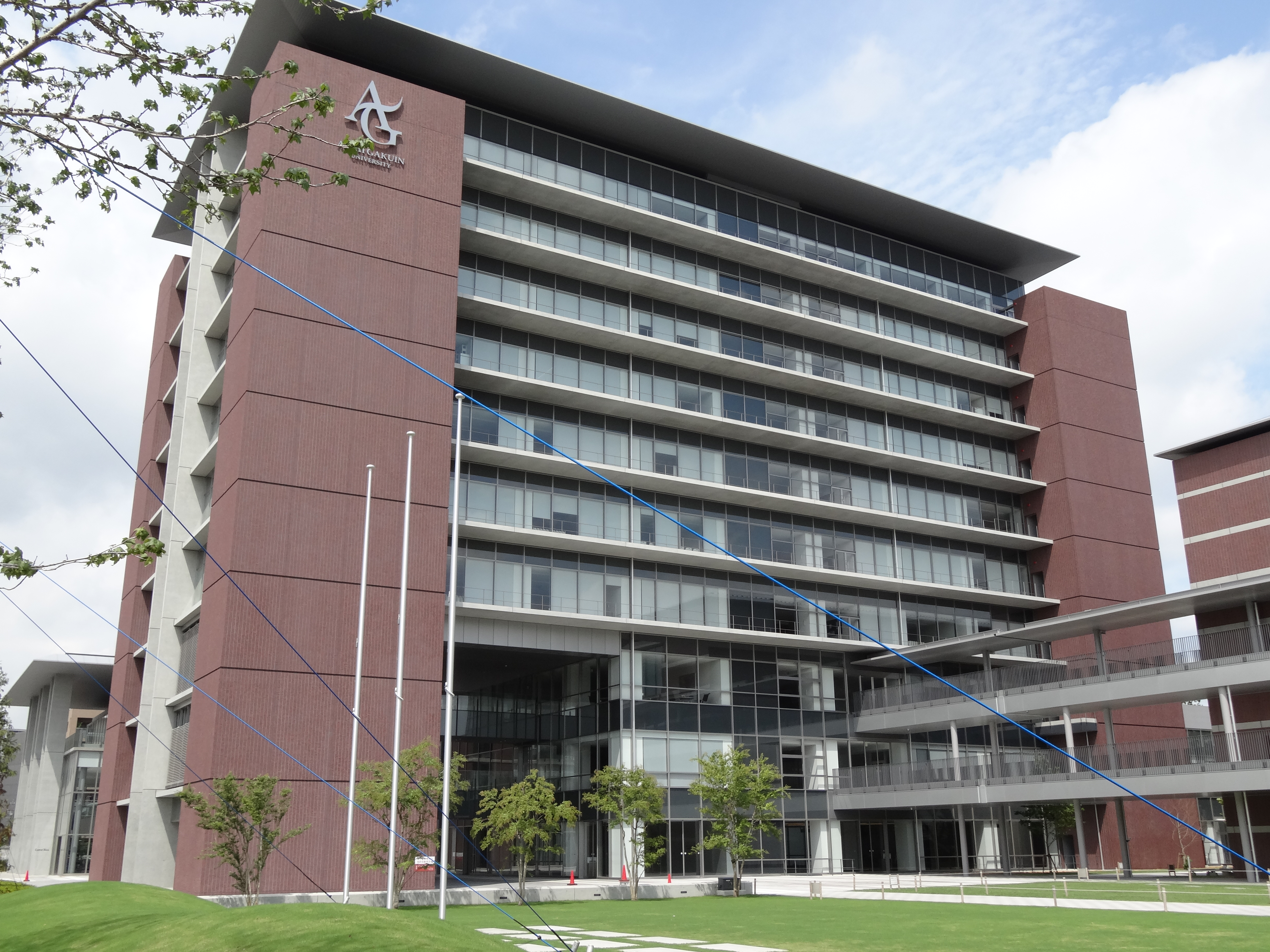
Meijo Park (Meijo Koen) campus

Aichi Gakuin is sister school to two other universities originating in Soto Zen institutions, Komazawa University in Tokyo and Tohoku Fukushi University in Sendai. Internationally, it has overseas partners in Canterbury Christ Church University in the UK, Bond University in Australia, University of Victoria in Canada, University of Arkansas-Fort Smith in the US, Universiti Tunku Abdul Rahman in Malaysia, and Dongguk University in South Korea. It has academic cooperation agreements with Elmira College in the US; Hanyang University in South Korea; Hunan Normal University, Dalian University, Changchun University, Ludong University, and Linyi University in China; Tzu Chi University and Tzu Chi University of Science and Technology in Taiwan; University of Education at the University of Da Nang in Vietnam; the National University of Laos; Padjadjaran University in Indonesia; and Hacettepe University in Turkey.

== Notable speakers ==
In 2003 on the 50th anniversary of the university's charter, former US President Bill Clinton was invited to give a lecture and received an honorary doctorate for his dedication to world peace, following which he met the parents of Yoshihiro Hattori, a Japanese high school student whose death in the US ten years previously had prompted worldwide calls for stricter US gun control. In 2015, the Dalai Lama gave a speech and interview with journalist Akira Ikegami.

== List of AGU alumni ==
=== Politics ===
- Kenji Kanda, Japanese politician (LDP member of the House of Representatives)
- Yukio Yoshida, Japanese politician (LDP member of the House of Representatives)

=== Culture ===
- Seamo, Japanese rap artist
- Katsumi Suzuki, voice actor
- Tengai Amano, playwright and theatre director
- Gaku Sano, actor

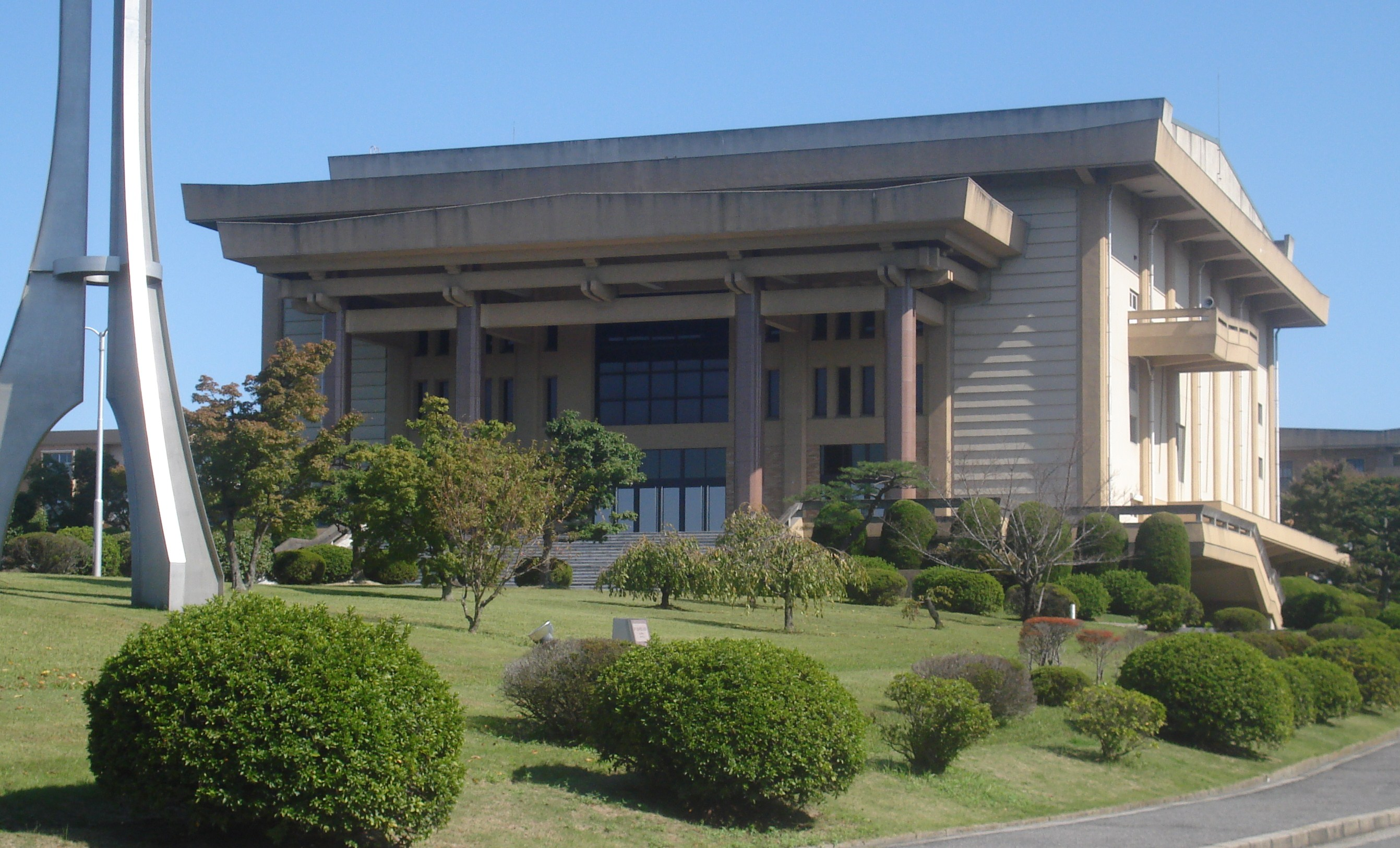
Memorial Hall, Nisshin Campus

=== Business ===
- Masaki Inayoshi, Nova holdings

=== Science and academia ===
- Shigemi Gotou, noted Orthodontistry specialist, chair of the Japanese Orthodontic Society
- Shigeki Iwai Japanese culture scholar
- Takao Kobayashi, historian
- Sugane Nakagawa, historian

=== Sports ===
- Yutaka Akita, Japan international professional footballer
- Daisuke Ando Japanese professional footballer
- Tomoya Ando Japanese professional footballer
- Kei Chinen Japanese professional footballer
- Sōsuke Genda, professional baseball player
- Shingo Hoshino, Japanese professional footballer
- Dan Howbert, Japanese professional footballer
- Shogo Kimura, professional baseball player and cricketer
- Yohei Kurakawa, Japanese professional footballer
- Katsunori Kuwabara, Japanese pro-golfer
- Shigetatsu Matsunaga, Japanese professional footballer and coach
- Tatsuro Okuda, Japanese professional footballer
- Akito Ōkura, professional baseball player
- Toshiyasu Takahara, Japanese professional footballer
- Akimasa Tsukamoto, Japanese professional footballer
- Kazuya Tsutsui, professional baseball player
- Hiroshi Urano, professional baseball player
- Mitsunori Yamao, Japanese professional footballer
- Akihiro Yamauchi, Japan national volleyball player
- Megumu Yoshida, Olympic synchronised swimmer
- Keiji Yoshimura, Japanese professional footballer
