= Tzu Chi =

Taiwanese humanitarian nongovernmental organization

Tzu Chi Foundation
- 慈濟基金會

Monastery information
- Full name: Buddhist Tzu Chi Charity Foundation
- Order: Mahayana
- Established: 14 May 1966

People
- Founder: Shih Cheng Yen
- Abbot: Shih Cheng Yen

Site
- Location: Xincheng Township, Hualien County
- Website: global.tzuchi.org

Tzu Chi Foundation
- Traditional Chinese: 慈濟基金會
- Simplified Chinese: 慈济基金会
Transcriptions
Standard Mandarin
- Hanyu Pinyin: Cíjì Jījīnhuì
- Bopomofo: ㄘˊ ㄐㄧˋ ㄐㄧ ㄐㄧㄣ ㄏㄨㄟˋ
- Wade–Giles: Tz'u^{2}-chi^{4} Chi^{1}-chin^{1}-hui^{4}

Buddhist Tzu Chi Charity Foundation
- Traditional Chinese: 佛教慈濟慈善事業基金會
- Simplified Chinese: 佛教慈济慈善事业基金会
Transcriptions
Standard Mandarin
- Hanyu Pinyin: Fójiào Cíjì Císhànshìyè Jījīnhuì
- Bopomofo: ㄈㄛˊ ㄐㄧㄠˋ ㄘˊ ㄐㄧˋ ㄘˊ ㄕㄢˋ ㄕˋ ㄧㄝˋ ㄐㄧ ㄐㄧㄣ ㄏㄨㄟˋ
- Wade–Giles: Fo^{2}-chiao^{4} Tz'u^{2}-chi^{4} Tz'u^{2}-shan^{4}-shih^{4}-yeh^{4} Chi^{1}-chin^{1}-hui^{4}

The Buddhist Tzu Chi Charity Foundation (Chinese: 佛教慈濟慈善事業基金會; lit. 'Buddhist Compassionate Relief Charitable Foundation') is a Taiwanese international humanitarian and nongovernmental organization. Its work includes medical aid, disaster relief, and environmental work.

The foundation was founded on 14 April 1966 by Cheng Yen, a Taiwanese Buddhist nun, as a Buddhist humanitarian organization, initially funded by housewives. Tzu Chi expanded its services over time, opening a free medical clinic in 1972 and building its first hospital in 1986. The organization underwent rapid expansion in the late 1980s and early 1990s, coinciding with a surge of popularity in Humanistic Buddhism in Taiwan. In the 1990s, the organization started major international disaster relief efforts, including the construction of new homes, schools, hospitals, and places of worship.

Today, Tzu Chi has a policy of being secular in its humanitarian work, with Buddhist teachings being integrated into its practices for volunteers. Cheng Yen is also considered to be one of the "Four Heavenly Kings" of Taiwanese Buddhism, with Tzu Chi itself being considered to be one of the "Four Great Mountains", of Taiwanese Buddhist organizations, along with Fo Guang Shan, Dharma Drum Mountain, and Chung Tai Shan. It has a special consultative status at the United Nations Economic and Social Council. It is also a co-chair of the UN Inter-agency Task Force on Religion and Sustainable Development Multi-Faith Advisory Council for 2022-2023.

== History ==
The Tzu Chi Foundation was founded as a charity organization with Buddhist origins by the Buddhist nun Cheng Yen in 1966 in Hualien, Taiwan after Cheng Yen saw the humanitarian work of Christian missionaries in Taiwan in the post World War II period. She was inspired by her master and mentor, the late Yin Shun, a proponent of Humanistic Buddhism, who exhorted her to work "for Buddhism and for all sentient beings". The organization began with a motto of "instructing the rich and saving the poor" as a group of thirty housewives who saved 50 NT cents (US$0.02) every day and stored them in bamboo coin banks to donate to needy families.

Tzu Chi experienced modest growth in the first two decades of its establishment, it grew to 293 members in 1968 and by 1986 had just 8,000 members. The foundation gradually expanded its services since starting as a group of thirty housewives, raising money for disaster relief after a small fire in 1970 that destroyed 43 buildings and opening its first free medical clinic in 1972. In 1986 the foundation established its first hospital in Hualien City.

With the surge in popularity of Humanistic Buddhism in Taiwan in the late 1980s and 1990s, and the publicity from fundraising to build its first hospital, Tzu Chi enjoyed a rapid expansion in membership alongside several other major Taiwanese Buddhist organizations during this time. From 1987 to 1991, Tzu Chi membership doubled in size each year, by 1994, it boasted a membership of 4 million members. Tzu Chi's expanded its aid work to the People's Republic of China in 1991 during the eastern China floods. In 1993, the foundation created a bone marrow registry, an effort that eventually caused Taiwan to alter its bone marrow laws, and organized a nationwide volunteer program for Taiwan in 1996. In the early 2000s, it expanded its services into recycling and environmental issues.

The foundation achieved much media attention in Taiwan in 2015 with a plan to develop a plot of land in Neihu District into a disaster relief center and cultural park which led to the destruction of parts of the Neihu conservation zone. The incident led to widespread critical coverage of Tzu Chi by the Taiwanese media, and scrutiny into its finances. During this time several unsubstantiated reports circulated in Taiwan about the foundation, including unfounded claims that the foundation invested in tobacco and weapons companies. Despite authorities not finding any illicit activity with its finances, calls for greater transparency were made.

Tzu Chi has grown to become a significant actor in civil society, Tzu Chi is not only the largest Buddhist organization in Taiwan, but also Taiwan's largest owner of private land. As of May 2024, the organization was estimated to have approximately 10 million members worldwide, and chapters in 68 countries.

== Organization ==
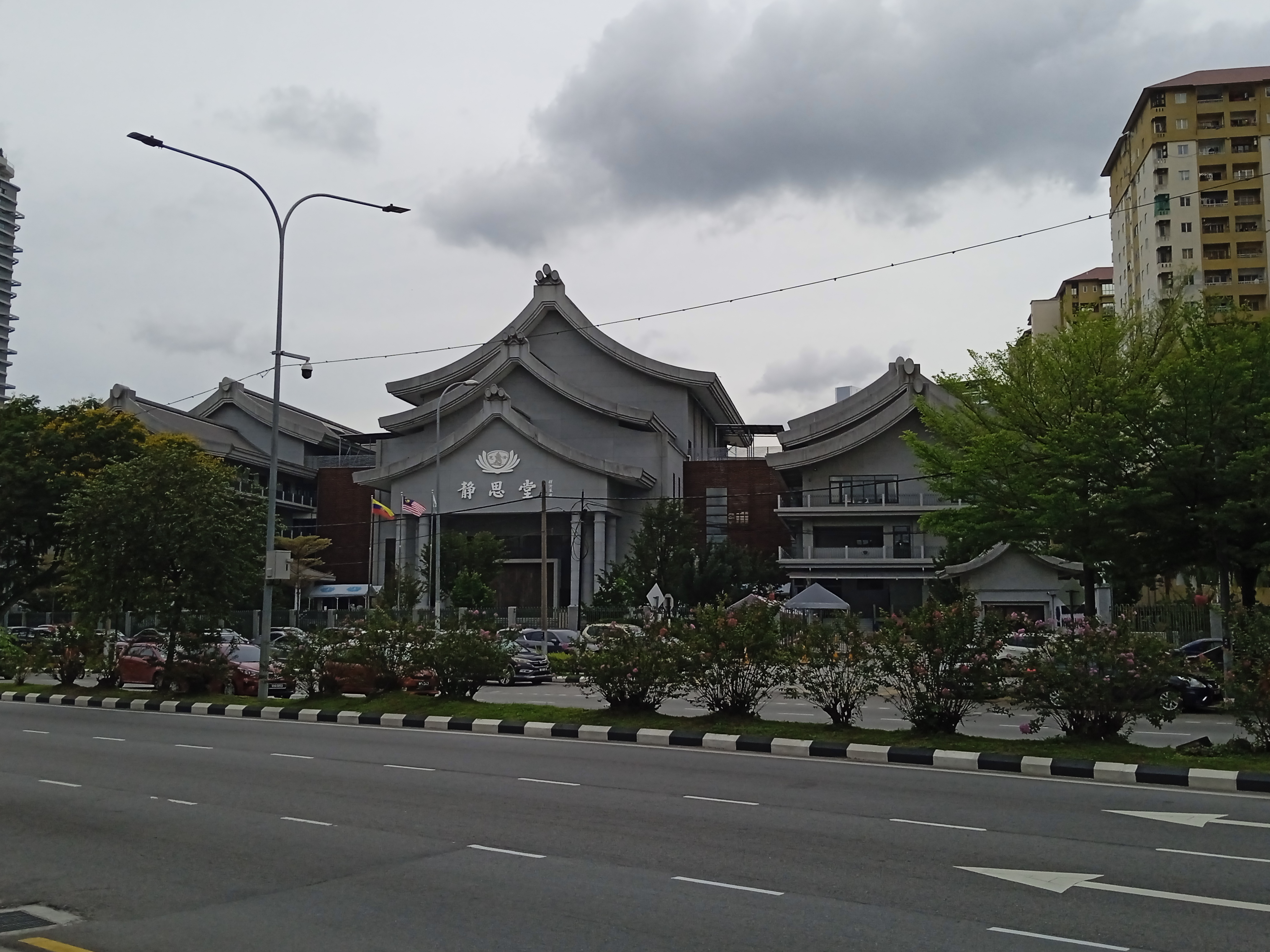
Main hall at Tzu Chi Foundation, Kepong, Kuala Lumpur, Malaysia

The Four Major Missions of Tzu Chi are Charity, Medicine, Education, and Humanistic Culture, as highlighted by the official motto, or concept of "Four Missions, Eight Footprints" (Chinese: 四大志業，八大腳印). The Eight Footprints are an extension of the Four Missions with the addition of International Relief, Bone Marrow Donation, Environmental Protection and Community Volunteerism.

The official website for the organization states that the organization started with Charity, and then extended its aims to include Medicine, Education and Culture. Its stated goal is to promote "sincerity, integrity, trust, and honesty".

Tzu Chi is notably distinct from the other Four Great Mountains in respect to three main unique characteristics. First of all, the founder of the organization is a female. Secondly, the founder is not a Buddhist scholar who promotes a specific interpretation of Buddhism nor started any kind of religious movement. And finally, the organization is officially a charitable organization and Tzu Chi itself focuses primarily on humanitarianism and community service rather than Buddhist spiritual development.

As a Buddhist nun, Master Cheng Yen ordains only nuns, who live at Tzu Chi's headquarters. Tzu Chi nuns follow the monastic rules for Buddhist nuns (bhikkhuni) but are not ordained in the traditional communal ritual typically done at Buddhist monasteries. Many Buddhist groups consider the lack of a traditional ordination as disqualifying Tzu Chi nuns as official Buddhist nuns, although scholars have noted that Tzu Chi members themselves largely don't care about this. Tzu Chi also has a special status between layperson and monastic known as qin xiou shi or 'pure practitioners'. This status is available to both men and women and consists of laypeople who take most of the monastic vows but do not shave their heads like monastics do and take on leadership roles within Tzu Chi.

=== Logo ===
Consisting of a ship that also simultaneously bears the lotus fruit and flower, the Tzu Chi logo symbolizes that the world can be made a better place by planting good karmic seeds. Followers believe that these "seeds" are required for flowers to bloom and bear fruit, or in other words, that a better society can be created with good actions and pure thoughts. The ship represents Tzu Chi steering a ship of compassion, representing their goal in saving all beings that suffer, while the Eight Petals represent the Noble Eightfold Path in Buddhism, which Tzu Chi uses as their guide.

=== Tzu Chi's Ten Precepts ===
Tzu Chi also has its own customized version of the Buddhist Precepts as formulated by Cheng Yen. The Ten Precepts of Tzu Chi are:

1. No killing
2. No stealing
3. No fornication
4. No lying
5. No drinking
6. No smoking or use of narcotics or betel nuts
7. No gambling
8. Practice filial piety and develop pleasant manners and speech
9. Abide by traffic laws
10. No participation in political activities or demonstrations

Cheng Yen developed these rules based on the new needs of modern society.

== Medical mission ==
One of the first major initiatives Tzu Chi took part in was the "Tzu Chi Medical Mission". This effort was inspired in 1970 after Cheng Yen noticed a link between poverty and illness after spending six years among the poor of eastern Taiwan.

Tzu Chi's first medical outreach occurred in 1972 when a free clinic was opened in Hualien.

=== Tzu Chi Hospital ===
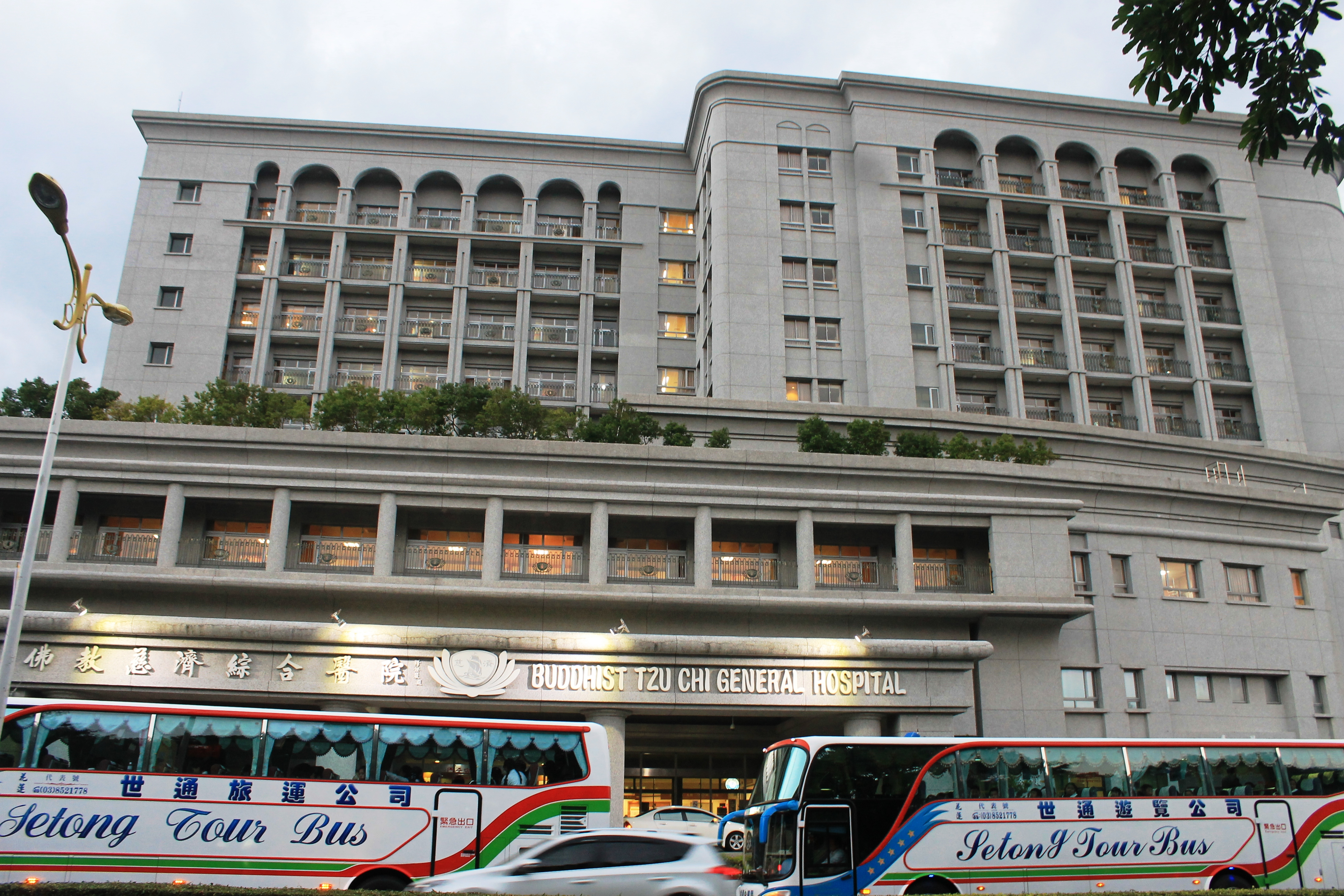
Tzu Chi General Hospital in Hualien in 2011

The Foundation established its first Tzu Chi Hospital in Hualien in 1986. A 600-bed general hospital had been planned in 1979 to service the impoverished eastern coast of Taiwan. A primary concern for Cheng Yen was that the area was isolated and the people in the area were cut off from aid during disasters. Despite setbacks both in funding for the hospital and finding an acceptable site. Ground was broken on the site eventually chosen on 5 February 1983 at a ceremony officiated by then Provincial Governor (later President) Lee Teng-Hui. However, two weeks after ground was broken, Cheng Yen received a notice from the military telling her that the property was needed by the military and that construction would have to stop.

A new site was obtained for the hospital with help from Minister of the Interior Lin Yang-kang. A second groundbreaking occurred on 2 April 1984 at the new site. The publicity of the project to build the hospital led to a significant increase in the number of Tzu Chi volunteers, with Tzu Chi membership increasing six-fold by the time of the second groundbreaking since the announcement of the project in 1979. Construction was completed and the hospital opened on 17 August 1986.

Tzu Chi has since built hospitals in Yuli, Hualien County; Dalin, Chiayi County; Guanshan, Taitung County; Tanzi District, Taichung City; and Xindian, New Taipei City. It has also a hospital in Jakarta, Indonesia.

In addition to building hospitals the Tzu Chi College of Nursing was founded on 17 September 1989 in Hualien in order to address the shortage of nurses on Taiwan's east coast, with a focus on serving the poor. It was the first private nursing college in Taiwan to waive tuition for selected courses, in addition to providing full scholarships for qualified Taiwan aborigine students.

=== Bone marrow registry ===
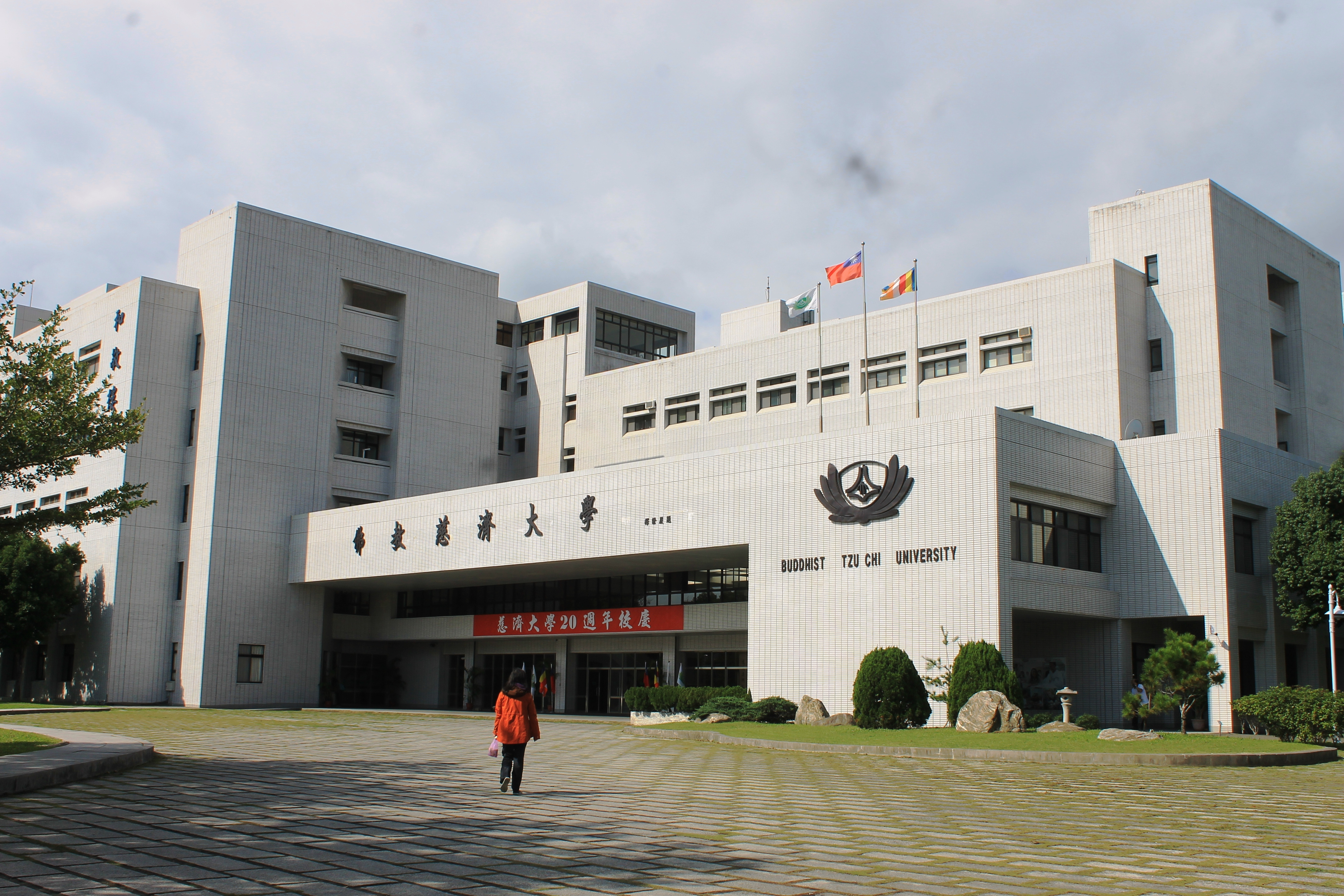
Main building at Tzu Chi University

Tzu Chi created the Tzu Chi Bone Marrow Registry, in 1993 after a young follower of Cheng Yen was diagnosed with Leukemia. Cheng Yen referred to the concept of bone marrow donation as a way to "save a life without harming yourself." This effort to register bone marrow donors from an organization with such massive membership like Tzu Chi caused Taiwan to change its laws regarding organ donations. (Note: Prior to 1993 Taiwanese law only allowed organ transplants between relatives.) This registry became a division of the new Tzu Chi Stem Cells Center, which was founded to improve research and treatment capabilities. By 2007 the program had saved the lives of almost 1,500 people in 25 different countries. By 2008, Tzu Chi had registered more than 307,657 bone marrow donors.

=== College of Medicine ===
Tzu Chi established the Tzu Chi College of Medicine in 1994. This college became Tzu Chi University in 2000. In the meantime Cheng-Yen appealed to the Taiwanese public to donate their bodies for medical training, attempting to dispel traditional taboos in the process. As a result of this appeal, public support for body donations surged nationwide. Consequently, at the Tzu Chi College of Medicine, there is one body for every four students to study as opposed to one body for every two hundred students at one school, the ratio is the lowest in the country.

In 1995, the Athletic Drug Testing Center was established at the request of the Ministry of Education and went into operation in 1996 during a national sporting event when gold medal winners were tested for banned drugs.

== Disaster relief ==
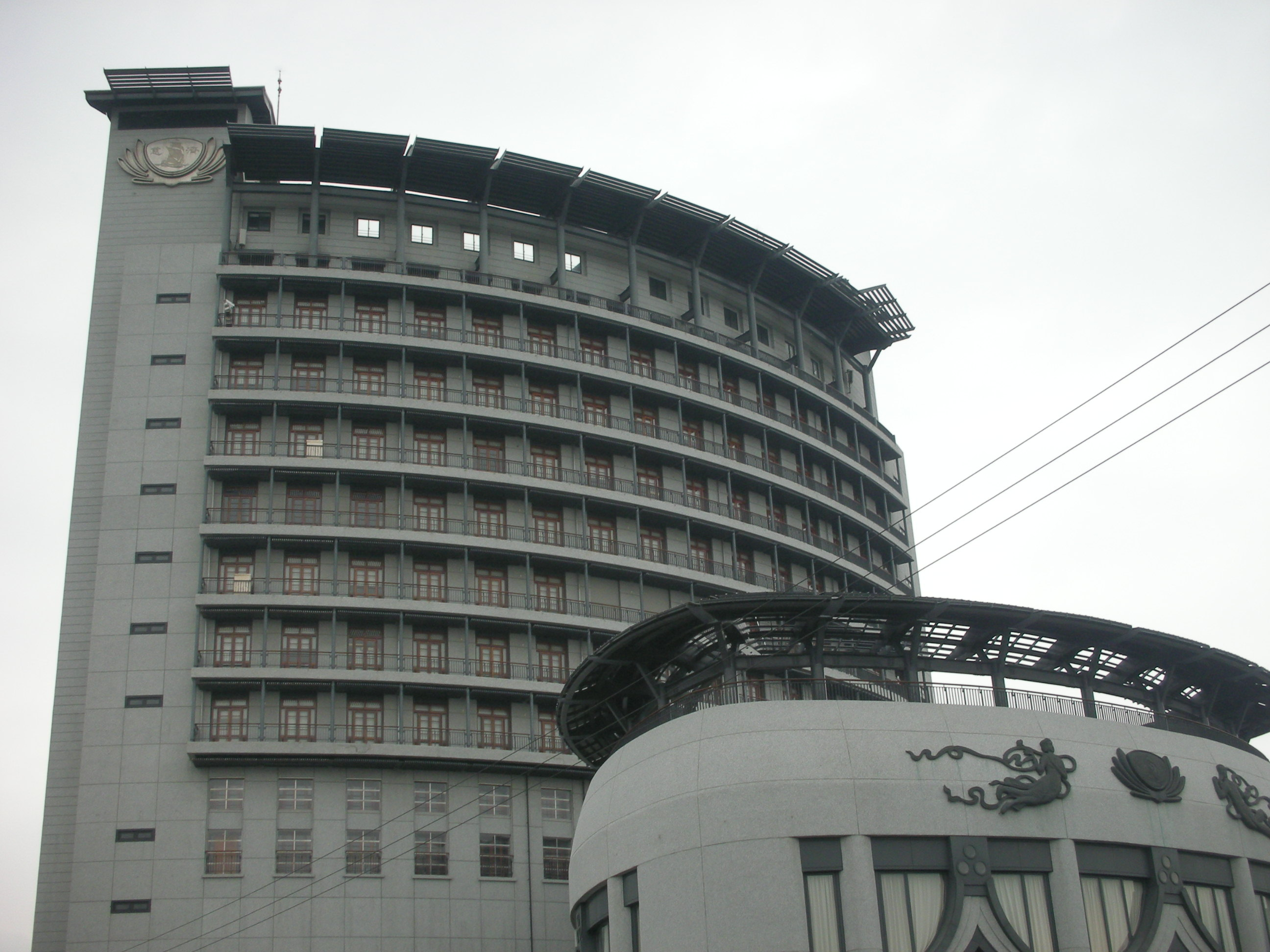
Tzu Chi Culture and Communications building

Tzu Chi is most well-known for its disaster relief efforts worldwide. In carrying out these projects, Tzu Chi has a policy that forbids public gatherings for the sole purpose of specific political, economic, and religious groups. Tzu Chi volunteers are not to discuss business, politics, or preach religion while giving aid. One of the most iconic attributes of Tzu Chi disaster relief efforts is that volunteers not only provide short term aid but also partake in long-term projects to rebuild the communities affected. Tzu Chi often builds new homes, schools, hospitals, and places of worship (including churches and mosques for non-Buddhists) for victims following a disaster.

=== People's Republic of China ===
Tzu Chi's involvement with providing aid in the People's Republic of China was difficult at first. Cheng Yen has referred to relief work in China as "Building a Bridge of Love." The initial problems with providing aid in China involved the political tensions between Taiwan and China and Communist China's disdain for religion. In Taiwan, it was difficult to convince Taiwanese to help the Chinese, and in China, it was difficult to convince government officials normally wary of religious organizations to accept Tzu Chi.

Tzu Chi's involvement in the People's Republic of China began in 1991, when it undertook relief operations after severe floods hit central and eastern China. The aid provided to China was Tzu Chi's first major effort at international relief aid, it also allowed Tzu Chi to develop its principles of delivering aid and establish relations with the People's Republic of China. Since then, the foundation has built schools, nursing homes and entire villages, including infrastructure in poor inland areas, such as Guizhou province.

Over the past twenty years, Tzu Chi expanded their humanitarian work and influence to 28 provinces, municipalities and autonomous regions in China. Projects include relief work after major disasters like the Sichuan earthquake; distribution of rice and goods to the poor; social programs like regular visits to the needy; scholarship programs to the less privileged students; medical missions like bone marrow donation and free clinics; and educational outings of environmental protection and recycling activities.

In March 2008, Tzu Chi became the first organization represented by a non-Mainland resident to be registered with the Chinese government.

In the aftermath of the 2008 Sichuan earthquake, Tzu Chi sent food, blankets and medical aid to survivors, while volunteers in China set out for the disaster zone. Tzu Chi was also one of the few organizations the Chinese government allowed to bring in aid workers from overseas to join the relief effort. With the motto "First to arrive, last to leave," the organization has continued with long-term reconstruction work in Sichuan, and by 2010, had rebuilt thirteen schools in the region.

In August 2010, Tzu Chi became the first overseas NGO to receive permission from the Ministry of Civil Affairs to set up a nationwide charity foundation. Normally, overseas organizations must register with the Ministry of Commerce as businesses. The foundation received the China Charity Award from the Ministry of Civil Affairs for its work in charity and promoting the well-being of society in 2006 and again in 2008.

=== Republic of China (Taiwan) ===
In 1996, Tzu Chi started a nationwide volunteer program where volunteers are registered according to where they live with the goal of "neighbors helping neighbors." The community volunteer initiative began as a disaster relief effort started in response to Typhoon Herb.

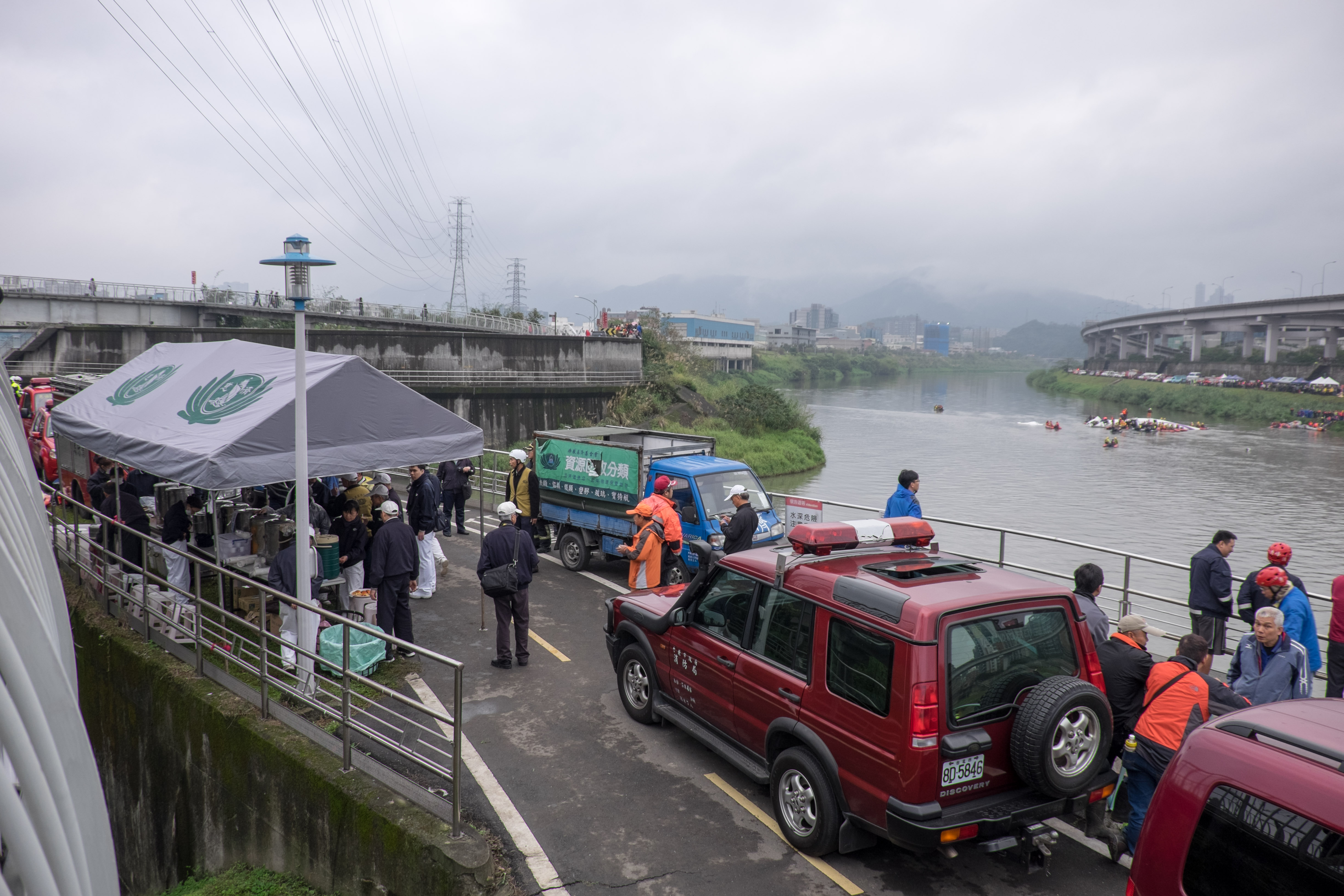
Tzu Chi tent at rescue site

Tzu Chi volunteers were one of the first responders in the Chi-Chi earthquake (known in Taiwan as the 921 earthquake) of 1999, mobilizing within 2 hours to provide thousands of sets of food and relief supplies to victims. The volunteers followed a strict system of organization where commissioners and teams of volunteers were assigned to specific townships, and teams were assigned to specific areas within the townships. This organizational structure was what allowed the volunteers to be mobilized so quickly and efficiently. The earthquake prompted Cheng Yen to start "Project Hope", a long-term project to rebuild 51 schools for those effected by the disaster. Tzu Chi raised more relief funds for the earthquake than any other religious organization in Taiwan, raising nearly sixty times as much funds for the relief effort than the next largest fundraiser, Fo Guang Shan. The 921 earthquake was credited for prompting Tzu Chi to create a disaster relief coordination center at its headquarters to organize quicker disaster response services.

Tzu Chi was also active in providing aid after Typhoon Nepartak struck Taiwan in 2016, providing relief supplies, rebuilding communities, and providing medical care through its medical support staff in Taimali, Taiwan which have been holding medical outreach free clinics in the area since 2006.

=== Outside Greater China ===
Tzu Chi has participated in numerous other relief projects around the world, including sending teams to Indonesia and Sri Lanka in the wake of the tsunami resulting from the 2004 Indian Ocean earthquake as well as to Pakistan after the 2005 earthquake in their northern mountains. The latter was done despite poor relations between the governments of the two countries.

Following the disappearance of Malaysia Airlines Flight 370 in 2014, Tzu Chi immediately sent their specially trained teams to Beijing and Malaysia to provide trauma relief and emotional support to families and others affected by the tragedy, in accordance with a 2007 agreement with Malaysia Airlines to fulfill the need for emergency response support services.

In the aftermath of Hurricane Sandy, the organization announced on 18 November 2012 a donation of $10 million in the form of $300 and $600 Visa debit cards to those affected in the New York and New Jersey area. Volunteers handed out these cards in parts of Brooklyn, Queens, and Staten Island. Tzu Chi was also active in providing aid following the 2015 Nepal earthquake. Tzu Chi was also active in relief efforts during Hurricane Harvey in 2017, the group provided aid, as well as cash gifts for those who helped the community during the disaster. In 2016, the organization distributed in the United States over $2 million in cash cards to disaster victims. As of 2015, Tzu Chi has provided disaster relief aid to over 85 countries worldwide.

During the Covid pandemic, the Tzu Chi foundation continued its disaster relief work, providing resources to families struggling with poverty. For example, after months of searching, in December 2020 the Tzu Chi found a location for a pandemic-related food distribution event, partnering with the Church of Jesus Christ of Latter-day Saints and the Echame La Mano Pura Vida Foundation to provide food, water, and other essentials. The foundation has also had pre-pandemic humanitarian work in the United States, such as their Happy Campus Program, Mobile Food Pantry Program, and educational programs.

Following the 2023 Monterey Park shooting, in the United States, Tzu Chi volunteers went to relay information in Mandarin and Cantonese to victims’ families, of whom many were Taiwanese Americans, and assist in funeral arrangements. Tzu Chi volunteers were also recruited by the Los Angeles County District Attorney’s Office to translate personal information, and link families’ needs to government resources.

== Global presence ==
Tzu Chi's headquarters is located in Xincheng Township, Hualien County, Taiwan.

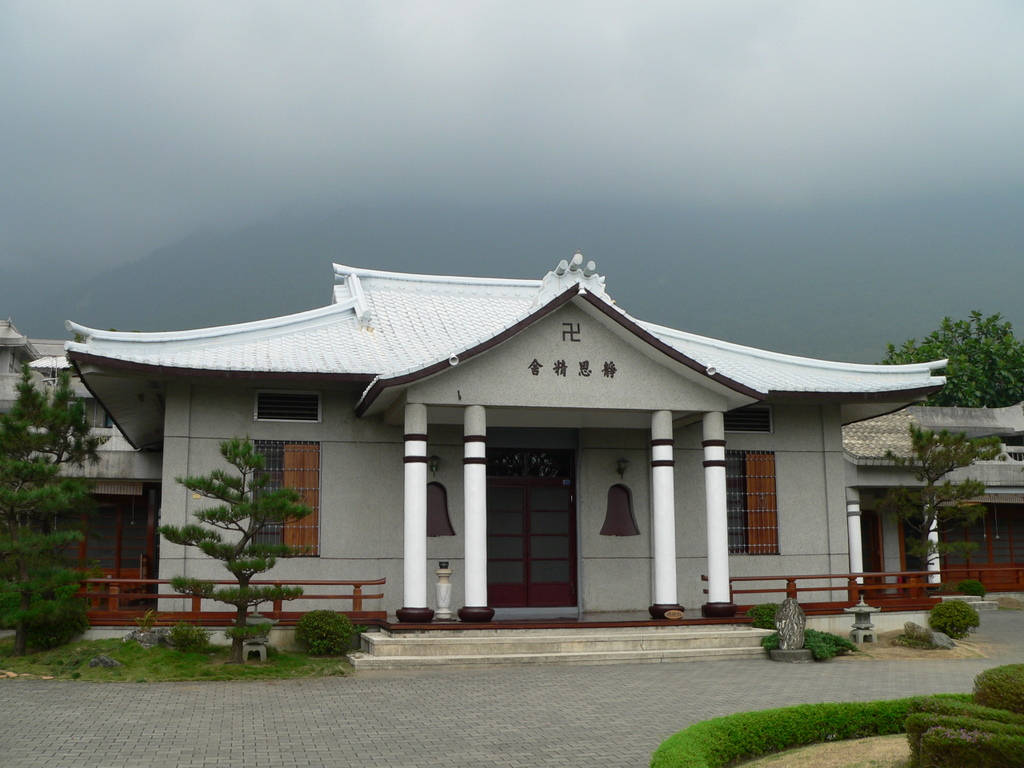
Jing Si Abode (静思精舍)

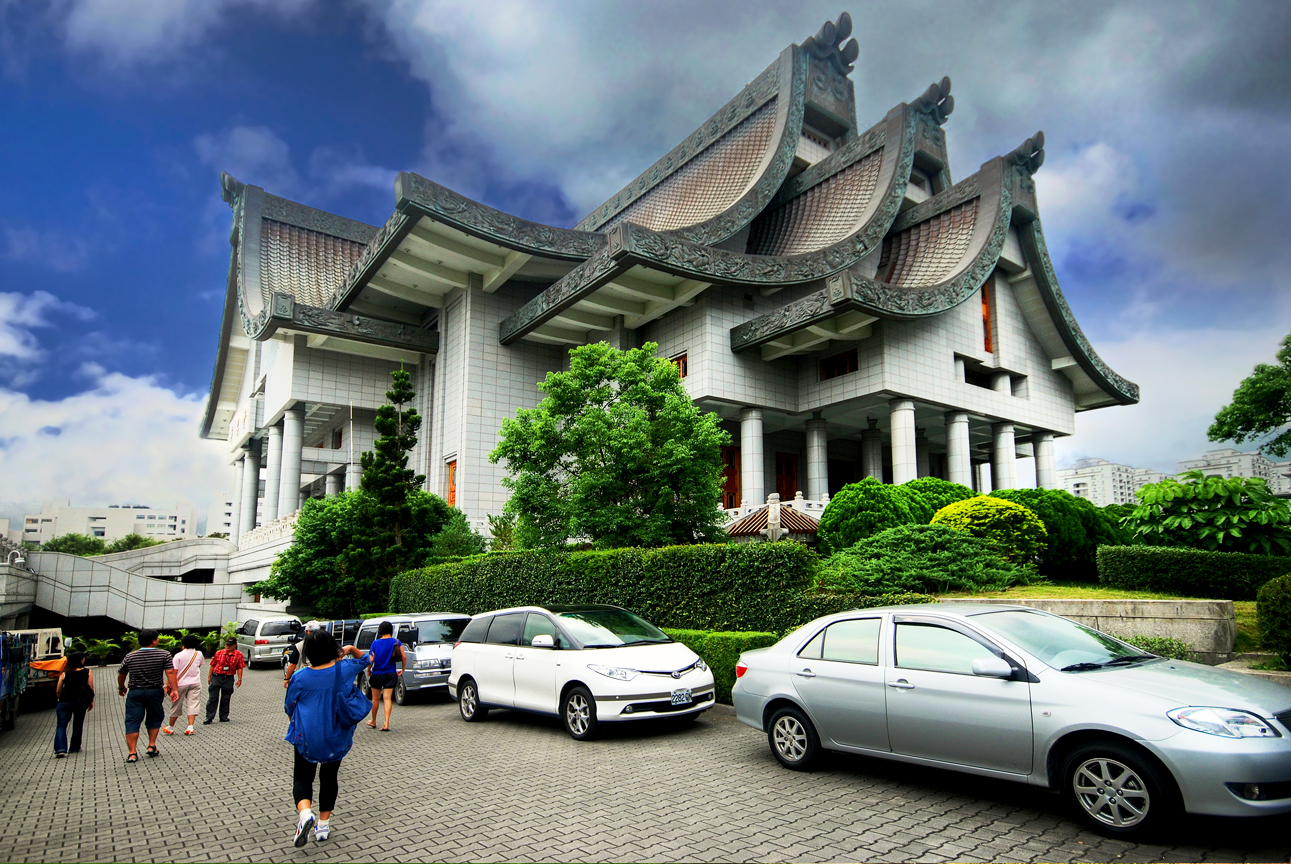
The Hall of Still Thoughts; Tzu Chi General Hospital can be seen at the right

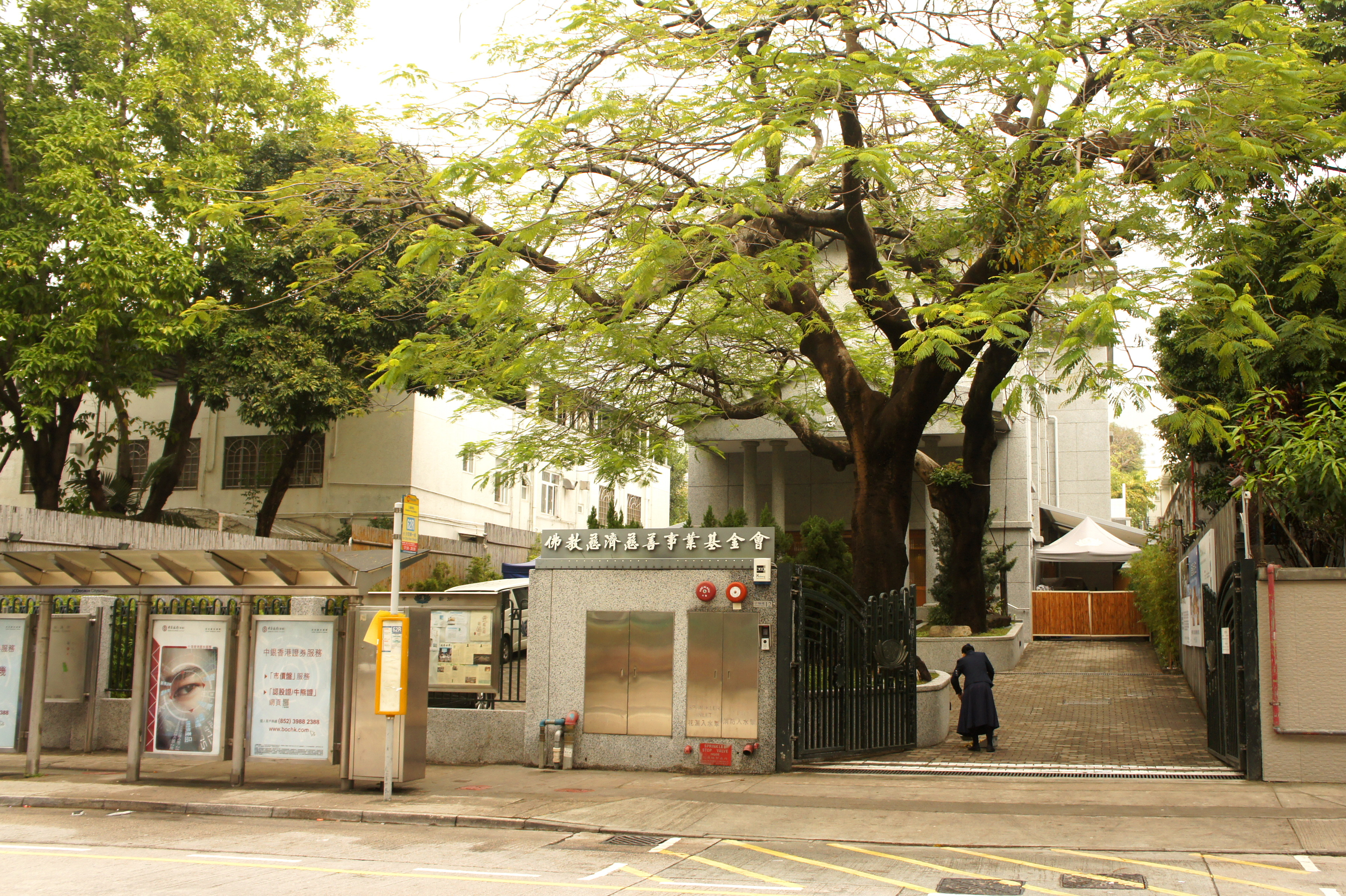
Tzu-Chi Foundation in Hong Kong

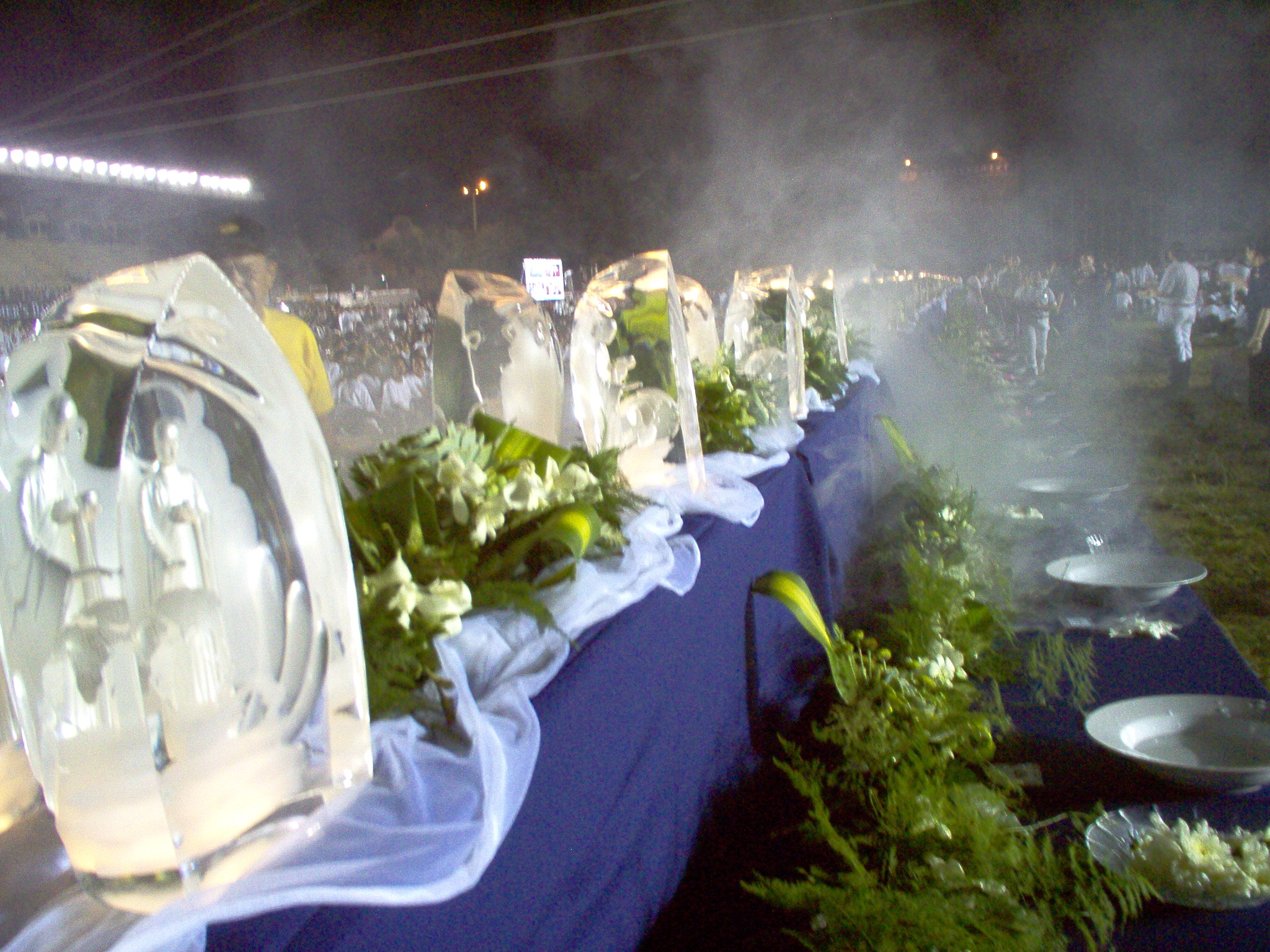
The usual set up for the Tzu Chi 3-in-1 Celebration (浴佛典禮)

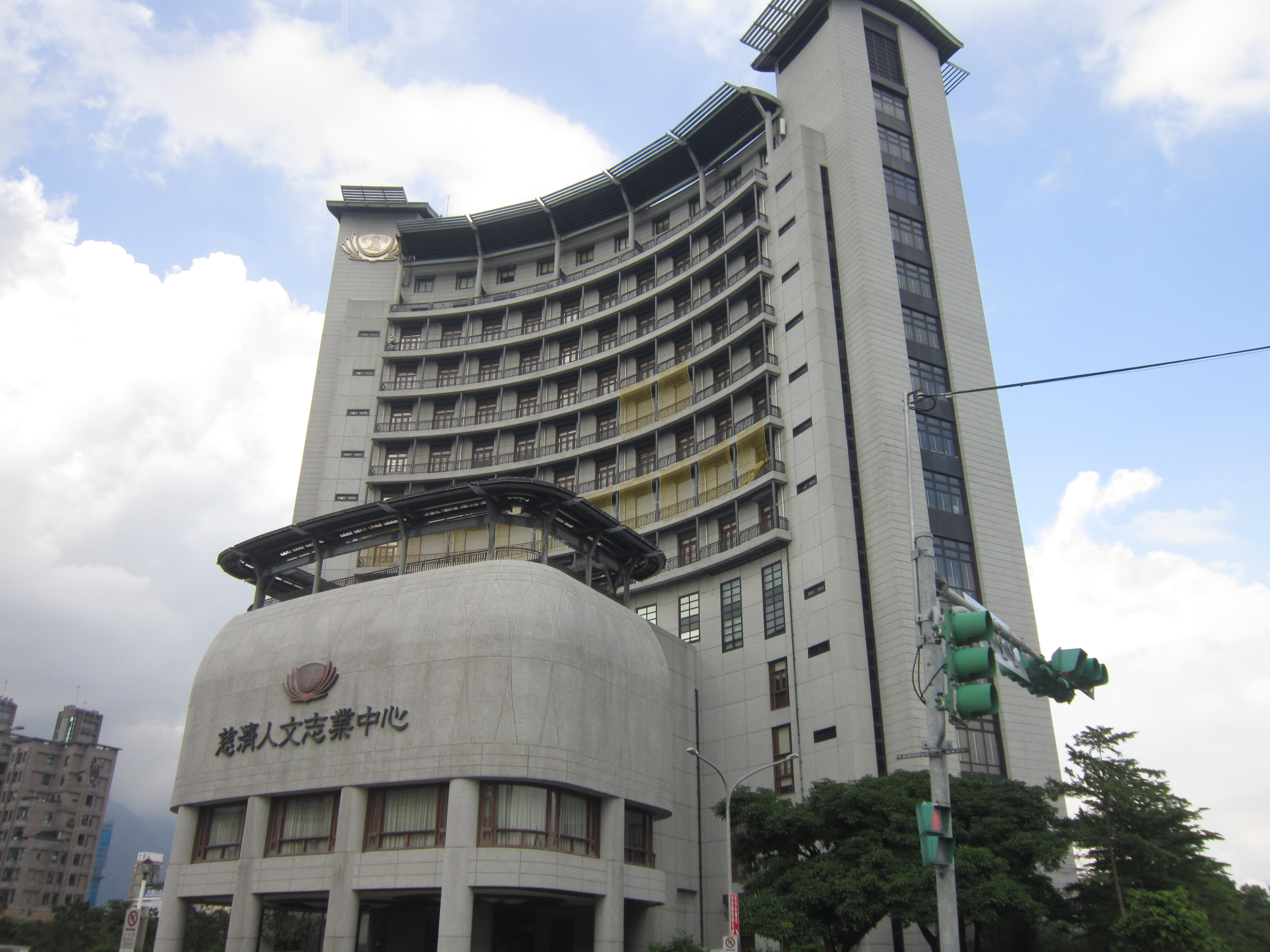
Tzu Chi Culture and Communication building

=== Portfolios ===
Tzu Chi's portfolios include case management, medical, educational and disaster relief.

The organization builds and operates many hospitals and schools, with outreach efforts that range from visits to nursing homes to providing bone marrow surgery, as well as offering items such as washing machines to struggling single mothers. The television "Da Ai" network operates with its own news and television programming. Chinese schools have also been established abroad, such as in Australia and the United States, which, apart from teaching Chinese and sign language, also guides students in ways of compassion and community service.

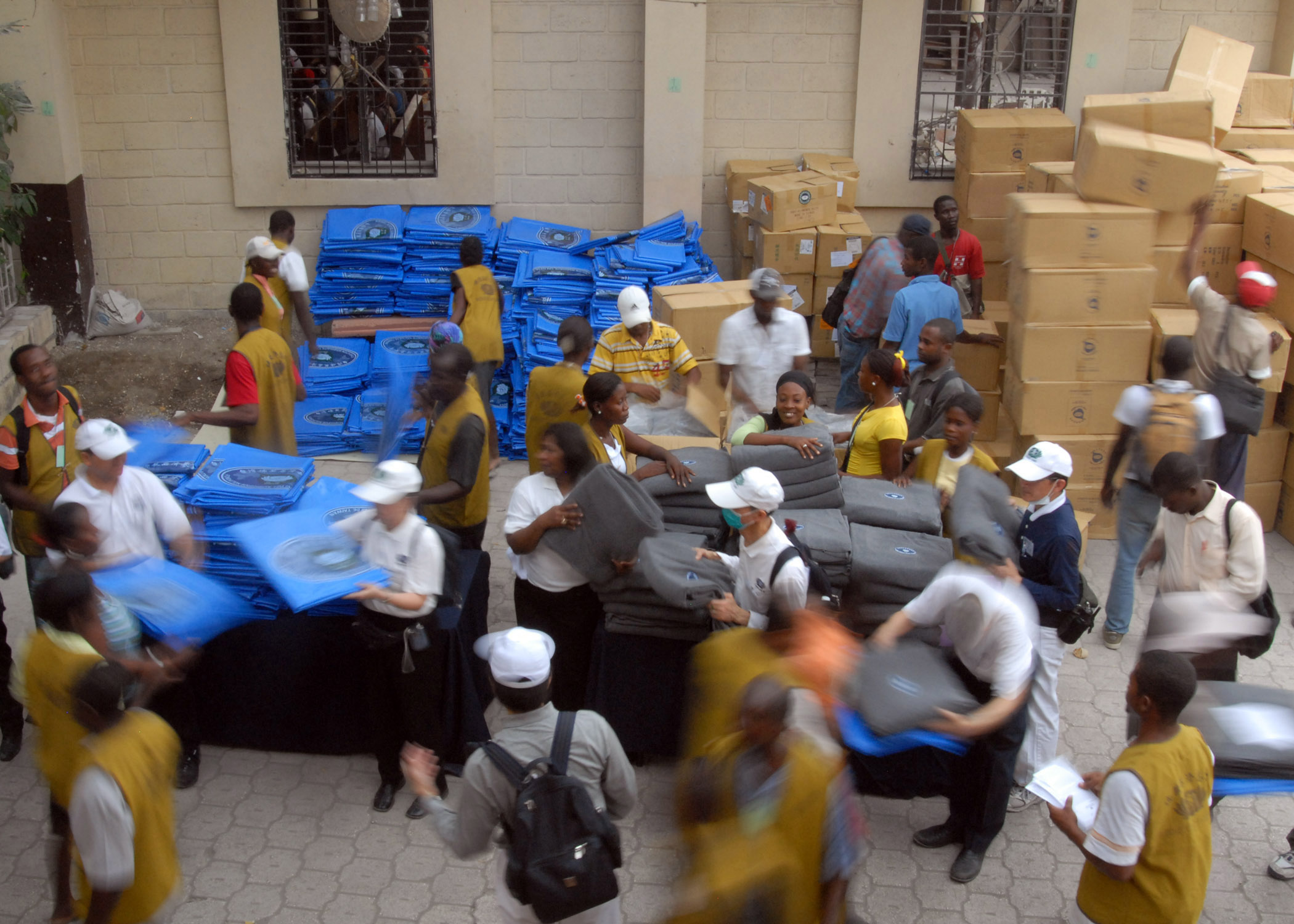
Tzu Chi volunteers distribute blankets to victims of the 2010 Haitian earthquake

=== Recycling ===
A significant fraction of funds raised by Tzu Chi revolves around environmentally friendly goals in encouraging the recycling of items such as water bottles as well as using reusable items or reusing items to reduce waste.

As of 2014, the foundation operates over 5,600 recycling stations. One of the foundation's projects is the recycling of polyethylene terephthalate (PET) plastic bottles for the production of textiles. The project, which was started in 2006, collects PET plastic bottles and recycles them into cloth. The project is handled by the Tzu Chi sponsored nonprofit Da Ai Technology Co. The products are all designed by members of the paid staff and recycled plastic bottles make up about half of the raw materials for the products. The project collects about 2,000 tons of plastic bottles each year. Tzu Chi's recycling centers have been a source of criticism however, with critics arguing that Tzu Chi's recycling efforts result in lost income for poor trash collectors.

Since 2007, the foundation has produced over 460,000 polyester blankets out of recycled plastic bottles, many of which have been distributed as part of Tzu Chi's disaster relief programs throughout the world. Other items made with the recycled resins include thermal underwear, T-shirts, hospital bed sheets, medical gowns, suitcases, stuffed animals and uniforms for Tzu Chi volunteers. While the project relies on recycled plastic bottles for the production of its products, its leaders have stated that it is still best for people to not use plastic bottles at all.

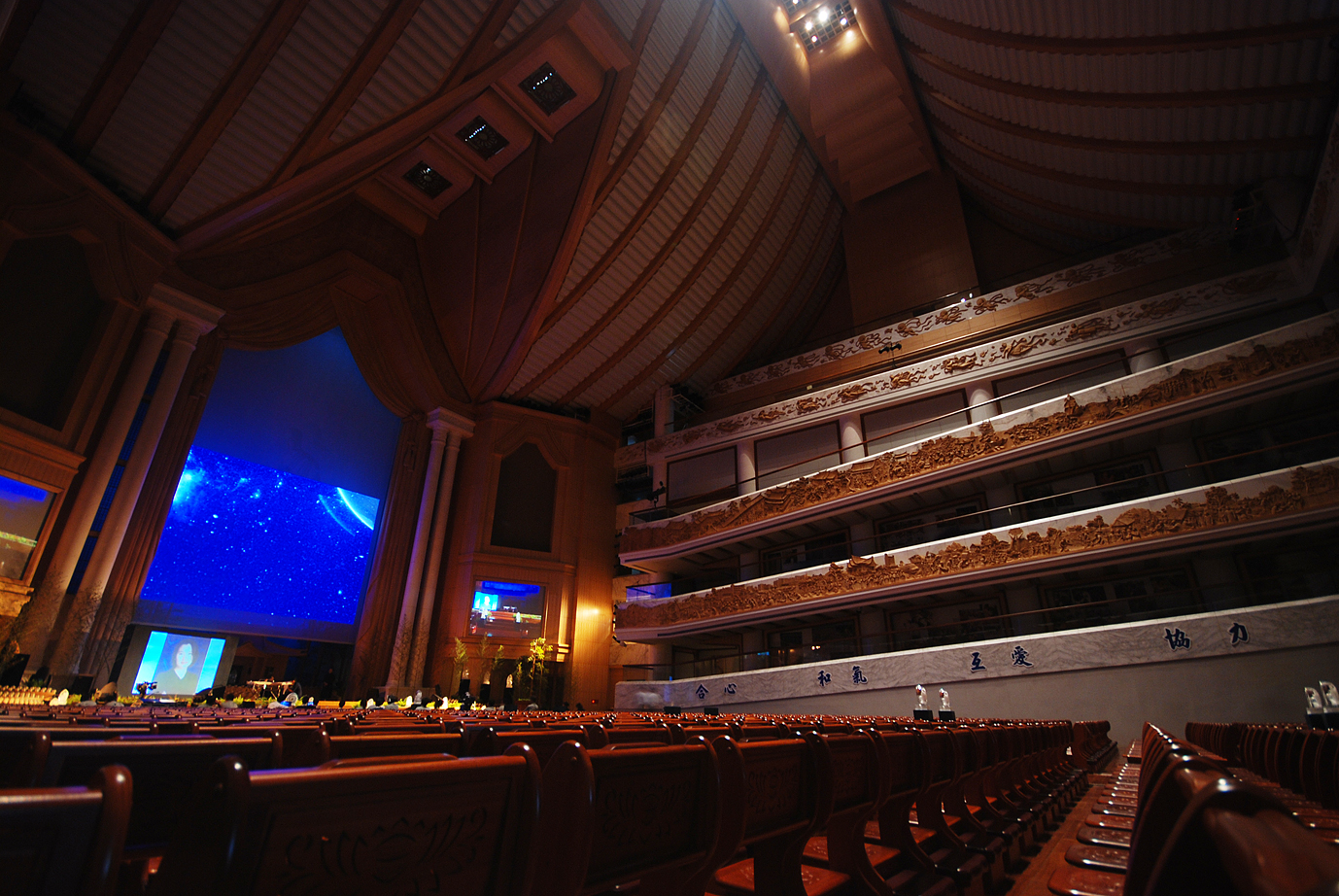
Inside the main hall of Tzu Chi Foundation

=== Dharma ===
The teachings of the Buddha and founder Cheng Yen play a core role in the workings of the organization. "Tzu Chi Day" is celebrated every year on the second Sunday of May which generally coincides with the Buddha's birthday (Vesak Day), and Mother's Day (as recognised in Taiwan). Celebrations during Tzu Chi Day include the bathing of the Buddha ceremony, the tradition's message is that it is the people that need cleansing before they become better individuals. Tzu Chi promotes many of the teachings of Buddhism, in particular the Lotus Sutra, and also has sutra adaptations through the use of sign language on the Sutra of the Infinite Meanings, which teaches that sentient existence is challenging and filled with disasters in the absence of observations of virtue, as well as the Water Repentance Sutra, which advocates and symbolizes the need to repent karmic transgressions. Despite these activities, Tzu Chi has a policy of not proselytizing religion directly at its public activities. Apart from not proselytizing, Tzu Chi's adaptation of Buddhist principles is apolitical.

In disaster regions where a particular religious faith is prominent, Tzu Chi regularly works together with local religious organizations. Tzu Chi has re-built mosques and churches in disaster zones where faith plays an important role in local society.

Tzu Chi nuns (bhikkhunis) do not rely on donations for their livelihood, something uncommon among most Buddhist orders. In earlier days, the nuns sustained themselves by farming, weaving and other handicrafts. More recently, they sustained themselves by the manufacture of electrical circuit breakers and other products.

=== International branches ===
Tzu Chi has volunteers in 68 countries and regions including USA, Canada, Australia, Thailand, Indonesia, Malaysia, Singapore, and various locations in Asia, Europe and Africa.

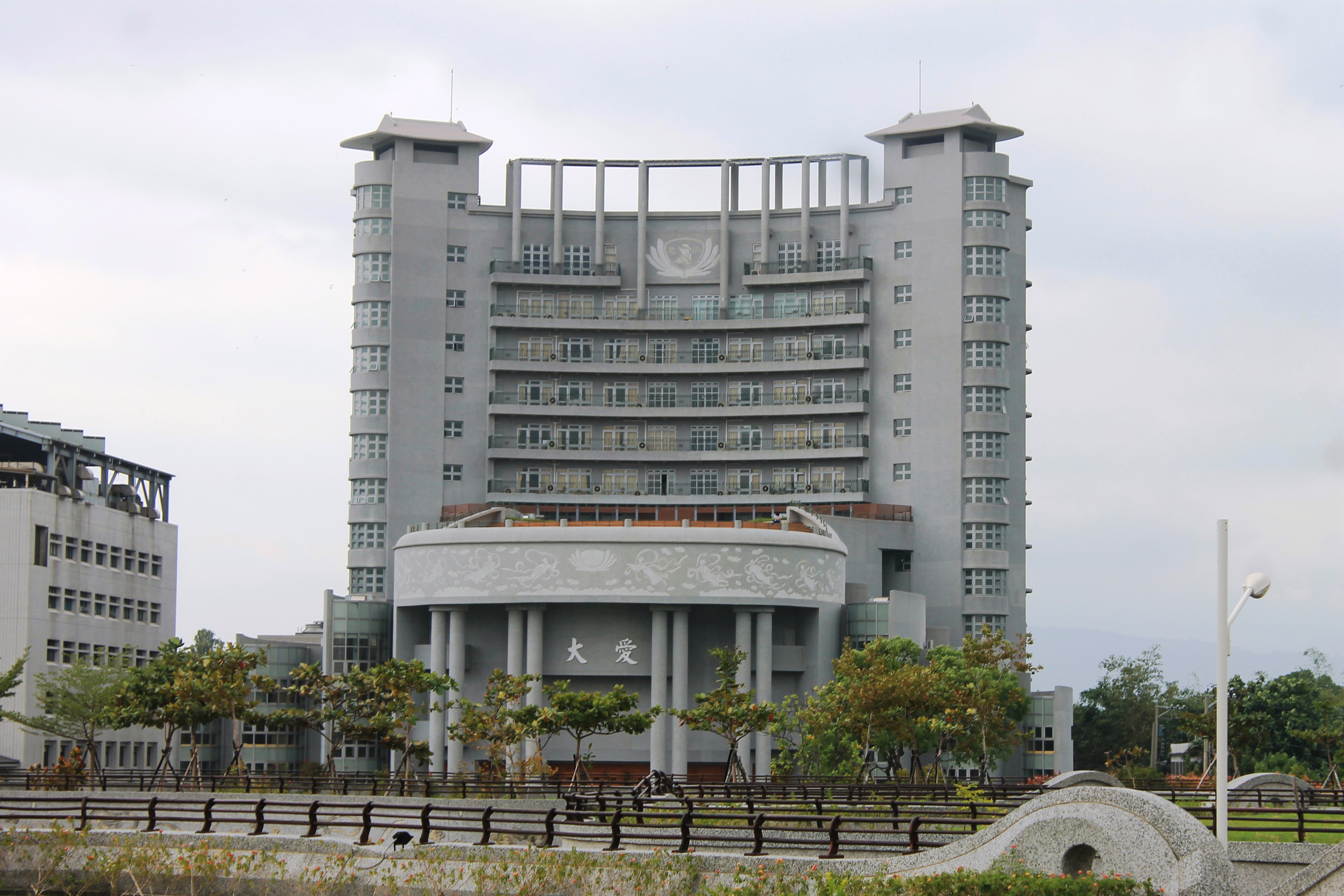
Da Ai building of Tzu Chi University, Hualien, Taiwan

=== Television and satellite network ===
On 17 August 1999, a television network was formed in Taiwan under the Tzu Chi Foundation of the Culture of Communication, Inc with the slogan "Love to make the world light up". Formally known as Da Ai Television, the network grew into a global broadcasting presence with offerings of a radio service and three television channels, including a channel in Indonesia.

=== Jing Si Books & Café ===
Jing Si Books & Café is a chain of nonprofit bookstores and cafes operated by Tzu Chi offering Tzu Chi merchandise and publications by Cheng Yen.

== Youth ==
The Tzu Chi Collegiate Association (Chinese: 慈濟大專青年聯誼會; pinyin: Cíjì Dàzhuān Qīngnián Liányìhuì; abbreviated 慈青; Cíqīng) is the foundation's college youth organization, and was officially established in Taiwan on 31 May 1992. With chapters at universities worldwide, its goal is to allow university students to be involved with Tzu Chi's activities. Tzu Ching volunteers are given the opportunity to participate in large-scale events such as disaster relief and international NGO conferences such as the annual UN Youth Assembly. Cheng Yen encourages the Tzu Ching volunteers to actively communicate with each other, with the goals of learning and improving. Each year an international Tzu Ching officer training retreat camp is held at the foundation headquarters in Hualien.

Tzu Shao (慈少) is the Tzu Chi branch for youths under the age of 18. Young volunteers in this group do community services such as helping out at free clinics, soup kitchens, and nursing homes.

Within the Indonesian branch of Tzu Chi, the role of Tzu Ching (慈青) extends beyond the university level. Instead, youth volunteers can start applying at the age of 16 through the Tzu Chi website.

== Year-end Blessings Ceremonies ==
Each year, Tzu Chi conducts a Year-End Blessings Ceremony attended by Tzu Chi workers, volunteers and members in January or February, where Cheng Yen distributes blessings in the form of red packets that embosses a coin in Taiwanese currency (Note: The coin symbolizes the fifty cents the thirty housewives saved at the founding of Tzu Chi) together with auspicious words for the coming year.
