= Daisuke Ando =

Japanese footballer

Personal information
- Date of birth: 18 July 1991 (age 35)
- Place of birth: Shizuoka, Shizuoka, Japan
- Height: 1.87 m (6 ft 2 in)
- Position: Forward

Youth career
- 2007–2009: Fujieda Meisei High School

College career
Years	Team	Apps	(Gls)
2010–2014	Aichi Gakuin University		

Senior career*
Years	Team	Apps	(Gls)
2014–2015	Alcyone Shida Futsal		
2015–2016	Arminia Ludwigshafen	32	(14)
2016–2017	SC Hauenstein	12	(5)
2017	Arminia Ludwigshafen	9	(2)
2017–2018	Wormatia Worms	28	(1)
2018	Wormatia Worms II	2	(0)
2018	1. CfR Pforzheim	11	(1)
2019	Fujieda MYFC	6	(1)
2020	TuS Mechtersheim	3	(1)
- * Club domestic league appearances and goals as of 17:04, 22 June 2021 (UTC)

Daisuke Ando (安東 大介, Ando Daisuke; born 18 July 1991) is a Japanese footballer.

== Career statistics ==
As of 22 June 2021

Club	Season	League			National Cup		League Cup		Other		Total	
Club	Season	Division	Apps	Goals	Apps	Goals	Apps	Goals	Apps	Goals	Apps	Goals
Arminia Ludwigshafen	2015–16	Oberliga Rheinland-Pfalz/Saar	32	14	0	0	1 (Note: Appearances in the Southwestern Cup)	0	0	0	33	14
SC Hauenstein	2016–17	Oberliga Rheinland-Pfalz/Saar	12	5	1 (Note: Appearances in the DFB-Pokal)	0	0	0	0	0	13	5
Arminia Ludwigshafen	2017–18	Oberliga Rheinland-Pfalz/Saar	9	2	0	0	0	0	0	0	9	2
Wormatia Worms	2017–18	Regionalliga Südwest	28	1	0	0	2	1	0	0	30	2
Wormatia Worms II	2017–18	Landesliga Ost	2	0	0	0	0	0	0	0	2	0
1. CfR Pforzheim	2018–19	Oberliga Baden-Württemberg	11	1	0	0	2 (Note: Appearances in the Baden Cup)	0	0	0	13	1
Fujieda MYFC	2019	J3 League	6	1	0	0	0	0	0	0	6	1
TuS Mechtersheim	2019–20	Oberliga Rheinland-Pfalz/Saar	3	1	0	0	0	0	0	0	3	1
Career total			103	25	1	0	5	1	0	0	109	26
