= Dan Howbert =

Japanese footballer

Personal information
- Full name: Dan Howbert
- Date of birth: July 29, 1987 (age 39)
- Place of birth: Kanagawa, Japan
- Height: 1.85 m (6 ft 1 in)
- Position: Forward

Youth career
- Azamino FC
- 2000–2002: Yokohama F. Marinos
- 2003–2005: Tatara Gakuen High School

College career
Years	Team	Apps	(Gls)
2006–2009	Aichi Gakuin University		

Senior career*
Years	Team	Apps	(Gls)
2010–2011	Kyoto Sanga FC	11	(0)
2012	YSCC Yokohama	0	(0)
Total		11	(0)
Medal record
Kyoto Sanga FC
Runner-up	Emperor's Cup	2011
- * Club domestic league appearances and goals

Dan Howbert (ハウバート・ダン, Haubaato Dan; born July 29, 1987) is a Japanese former footballer.

== Career ==
Howbert was born to a Japanese mother and a Liberian father. He opted to choose Japanese citizenship in 2009.
