= Eastern China flood of 1991 =

Natural disaster in China

- Simplified Chinese: 一九九一年华东水灾
- Traditional Chinese: 一九九一年華東水災
- Literal meaning: 1991 Huadong floods
Transcriptions
Standard Mandarin
- Hanyu Pinyin: Yījiǔjiǔyī Huádōng Shuǐzāi

In the summer of 1991, continuous, heavy rainfall caused a flood in eastern China as rivers overflowed, leading to the Chinese government requesting international aid.

== Background ==
Large amounts of rainfall beginning on 18 May quickly led areas of eastern China to begin overflowing with water; however, flooding reports in the area had begun to be officially addressed around late June. Specifically, the Huai, Chu, and Yangtze rivers are credited with the main flooding that resulted in the Anhui, Jiangsu, and Henan provinces taking the most damage. The Chinese government initially sent out soldiers and troops to help with evacuation and flood relief efforts, but with the number of homes and acres of crops destroyed increasing steadily, the Chinese government turned to other countries, requesting for aid in flood relief.

On September 3, 1991, the UN Department of Human Affairs (now known as the United Nations Office for the Coordination of Humanitarian Affairs) announced that the death toll was 556 in the Anhui province, 260 in the Jiangsu province, and 94 in the Henan province. In late January of the next year, The New York Times reported that the death toll was approximately 3,000.
