= Linyi University =

University in Linyi, China

- 临沂大学
- Type: Public
- Established: 1941
- President: Han Yanming
- Faculty: 2,000
- Students: around 34,500
- Location: Linyi, Shandong, China
- Website: Linyi University

Linyi University (LYU, simplified Chinese: 临沂大学; traditional Chinese: 臨沂大學; pinyin: Línyí Dàxué) is a public university based in Lanshan district of Linyi, Shandong province, China.

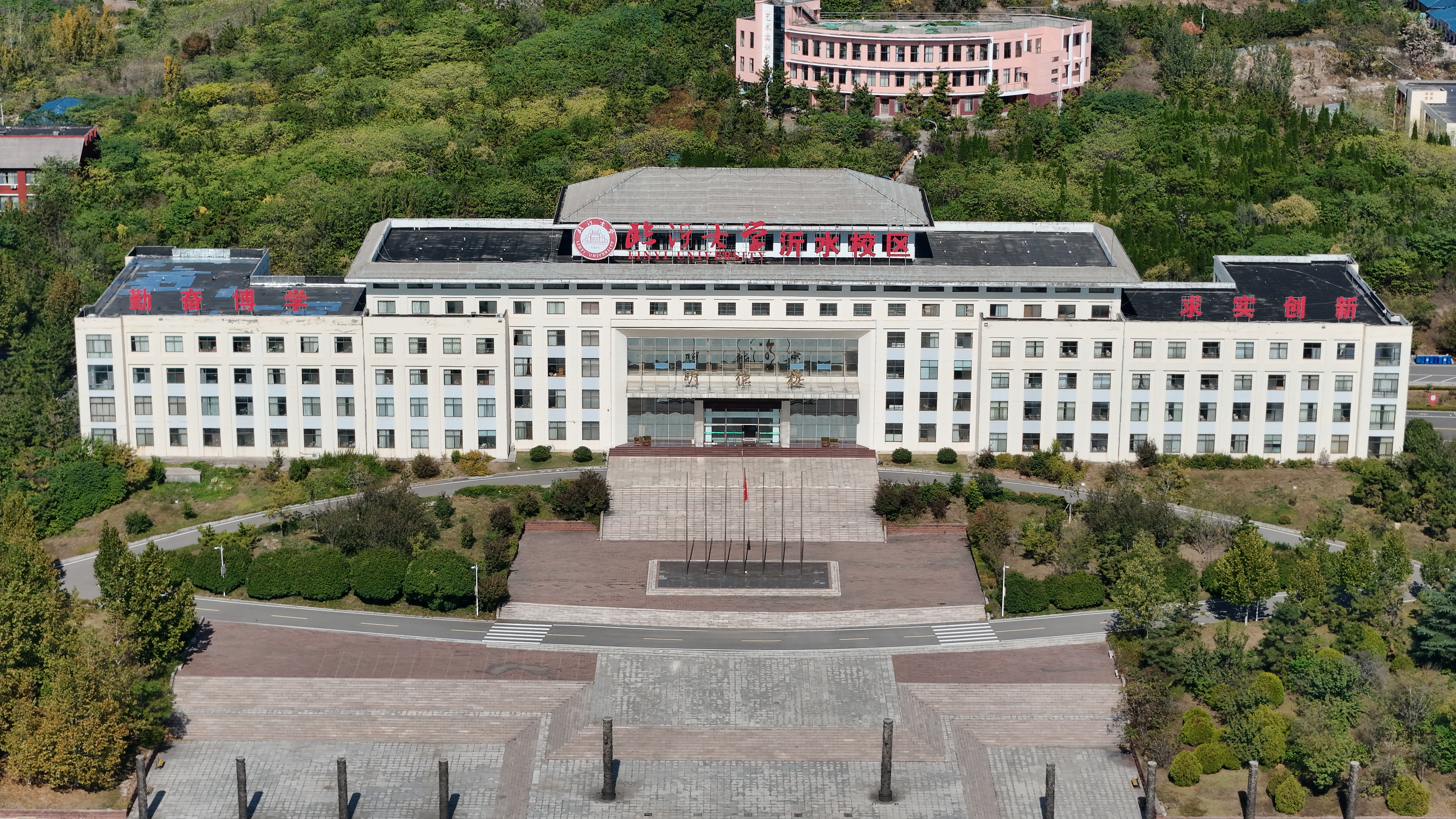
Mingde Building, Yishui Campus, Linyi University

It offers studies in 62 different undergraduate degrees, organized among nine major disciplines: Economics, Law, Education, Literature, History, Science, Engineering, Agriculture and Management.

== History ==
The predecessor school of Linyi University, Seaside High School of the Military and Political College (军政干部学院滨海中学), was founded in 1941. It was one of the first universities in Shandong, which was renamed Linyi University in 1958. Yet the institution was transformed into a teachers school just one year later. Through the following decades, it kept the profile of an institution for teacher education and was known as Linyi Normal University (临沂师范学院) after 1999. The college was awarded with name change in 2010 by the Ministry of Education, People's Republic of China.

== Faculty and Student ==
Linyi University has a faculty and staff of over 2,900, including 1,157 teachers with doctoral degrees. The university currently has 14 nationally recognized talents, including two recipients of the National Science Fund for Distinguished Young Scholars, and 32 provincial and ministerial-level talents such as Taishan Scholars. It also counts two National Outstanding Teachers among its faculty.

The university enrolls nearly 50,000 full-time students and more than 37,000 continuing education learners.

== International Cooperation ==
Linyi University has established partnerships with over 100 universities in 26 countries and regions. It offers several Sino-foreign joint undergraduate programs and operates a cooperative education institute and international research centers. The university is also a member of multiple national and regional education alliances and maintains a strategic partnership with the Chinese Service Center for Scholarly Exchange. A Confucius Institute has been established in cooperation with the University of Conakry in Guinea.
