= Satoru Hoshino =

Japanese footballer

Personal information
- Full name: Satoru Hoshino
- Date of birth: February 4, 1989 (age 37)
- Place of birth: Gumma, Japan
- Height: 1.72 m (5 ft 7 1/2 in)
- Position: Defender

Team information
- Current team: FC Machida Zelvia
- Number: 22

Youth career
- 2007–2010: Chukyo University FC

Senior career*
Years	Team	Apps	(Gls)
2011–2013	Thespakusatsu Gunma	14	(1)
2014–	FC Machida Zelvia	58	(4)
- * Club domestic league appearances and goals as of 23 February 2017

Satoru Hoshino (星野 悟, born February 4, 1989) is a Japanese football player.

== Club statistics ==
Updated to 23 February 2017.

Club performance			League		Cup		Total	
Season	Club	League	Apps	Goals	Apps	Goals	Apps	Goals
Japan			League		Emperor's Cup		Total	
2011	Thespakusatsu Gunma	J2 League	4	0	0	0	4	0
2012	Thespakusatsu Gunma	J2 League	6	0	1	0	7	0
2013	Thespakusatsu Gunma	J2 League	4	1	1	0	5	1
2014	Machida Zelvia	J3 League	29	3	-		29	3
2015	Machida Zelvia	J3 League	24	1	2	0	26	1
2016	Machida Zelvia	J2 League	5	0	0	0	5	0
Total			72	5	4	0	76	5
