= Tzu Chi University of Science and Technology =

University in Hualien, Taiwan

- 慈濟科技大學
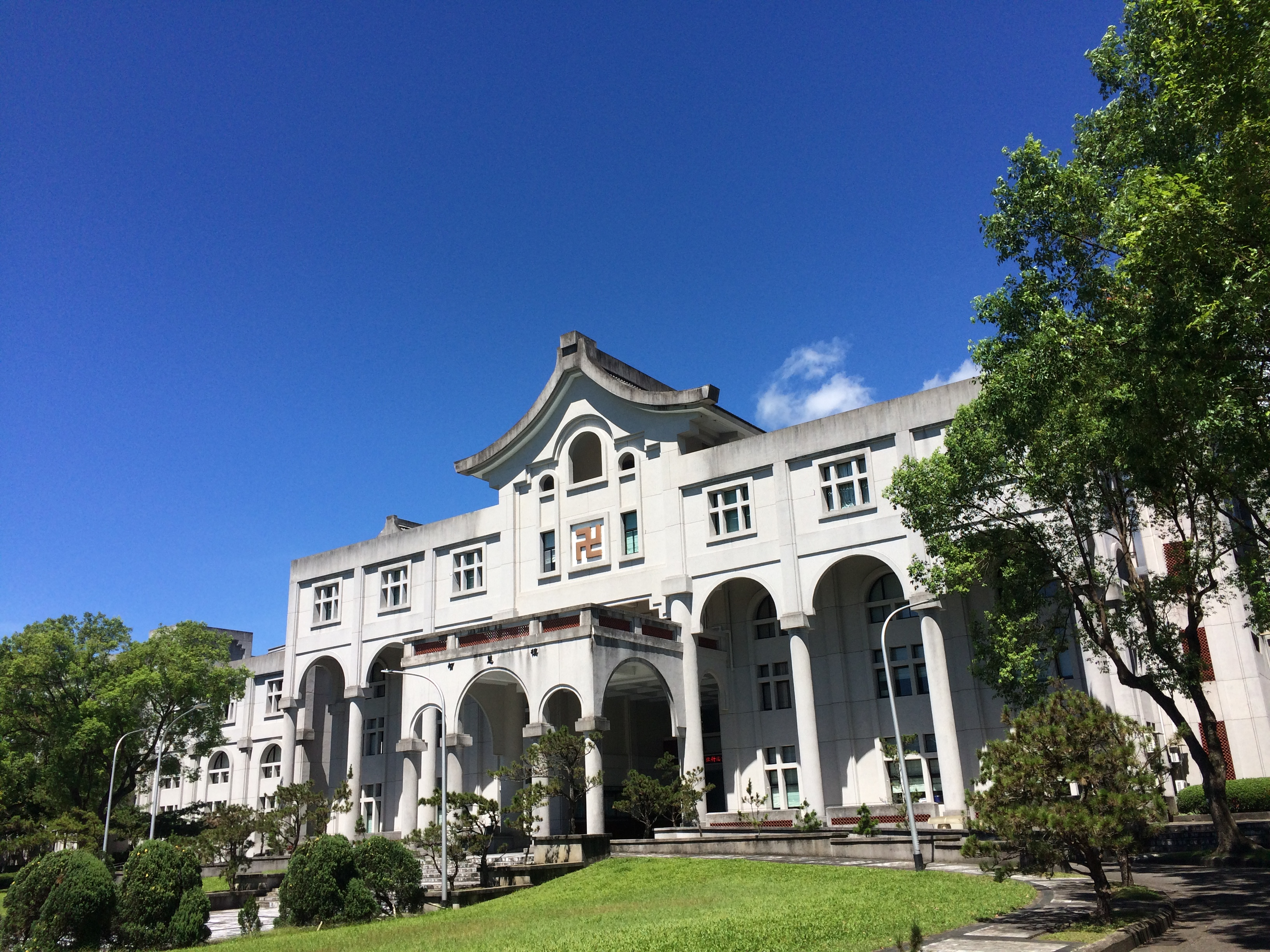
- Established: September 17, 1989
- Religious affiliation: Buddhist (Tzu Chi)
- Location: Hualien City, Hualien County, Taiwan; 23.9972°N 121.5644°E

Tzu Chi University of Science and Technology
- Traditional Chinese: 慈濟科技大學
Transcriptions
Standard Mandarin
- Hanyu Pinyin: Cíjì Keji Daxué

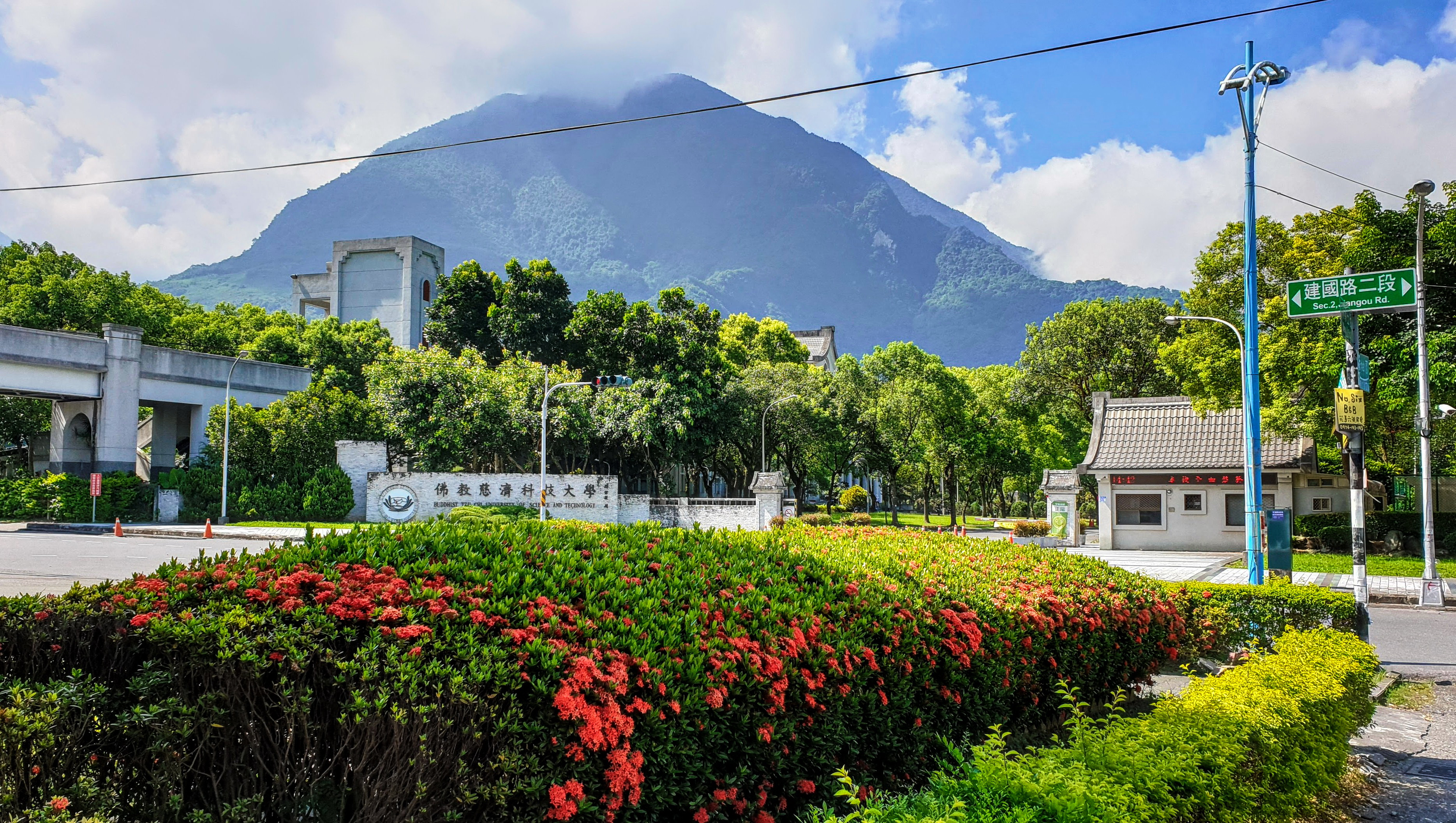
Tzu Chi University of Science and Technology

Tzu Chi University of Science and Technology (TCUST; Chinese: 慈濟科技大學) is a private university in Hualien City, Hualien County, Taiwan.

== History ==
Tzu Chi University of Science and Technology was established by Tzu Chi Buddhist Compassion Relief Foundation in 1989. It has departments in nursing, radiological technology, health management, information technology, and marketing and distribution management.

The university is located in Hualien City, along the east coast of Taiwan.

== Faculties ==
- Department of Marketing and Distribution Management
- Department of Health Administration
- Department of Information Technology and Management
- Department of Nursing
- Department of Medical Imaging and Radiological Sciences
- Department of Long-term Care
- Graduate Institute of Long-term Care

== See also ==
- List of universities in Taiwan
