= Kayo Hoshino =

Japanese volleyball player (born 1972)

Personal information
- Full name: Kayo Hoshino
- Born: 12 September 1972 (age 54); Ginowan, Okinawa, Japan
- Height: 1.77 m (5 ft 9 1/2 in)
- Weight: 69 kg (152 lb)
- Spike: 305 cm (120 in)
- Block: 287 cm (113 in)

Volleyball information
- Position: Outside hitter
- Number: 14

Career
Years	Teams
1991–2000	NEC Red Rockets

National team
Japan

Kayo Hoshino (星野 賀代, Hoshino Kayo) (born 12 September 1972) is a Japanese former volleyball player who competed in the 1996 Summer Olympics in Atlanta. She played as an outside hitter.

In 1996, Hoshino was eliminated with the Japanese team in the preliminary round of the Olympic tournament. Hoshino was brought on as a substitute in four games during the team's matches against Ukraine (three games) and the United States (one game), scoring no points.

== Club volleyball ==
Hoshino played for the NEC Red Rockets from 1991 to 2000.
