= Arminia Ludwigshafen =

German football club

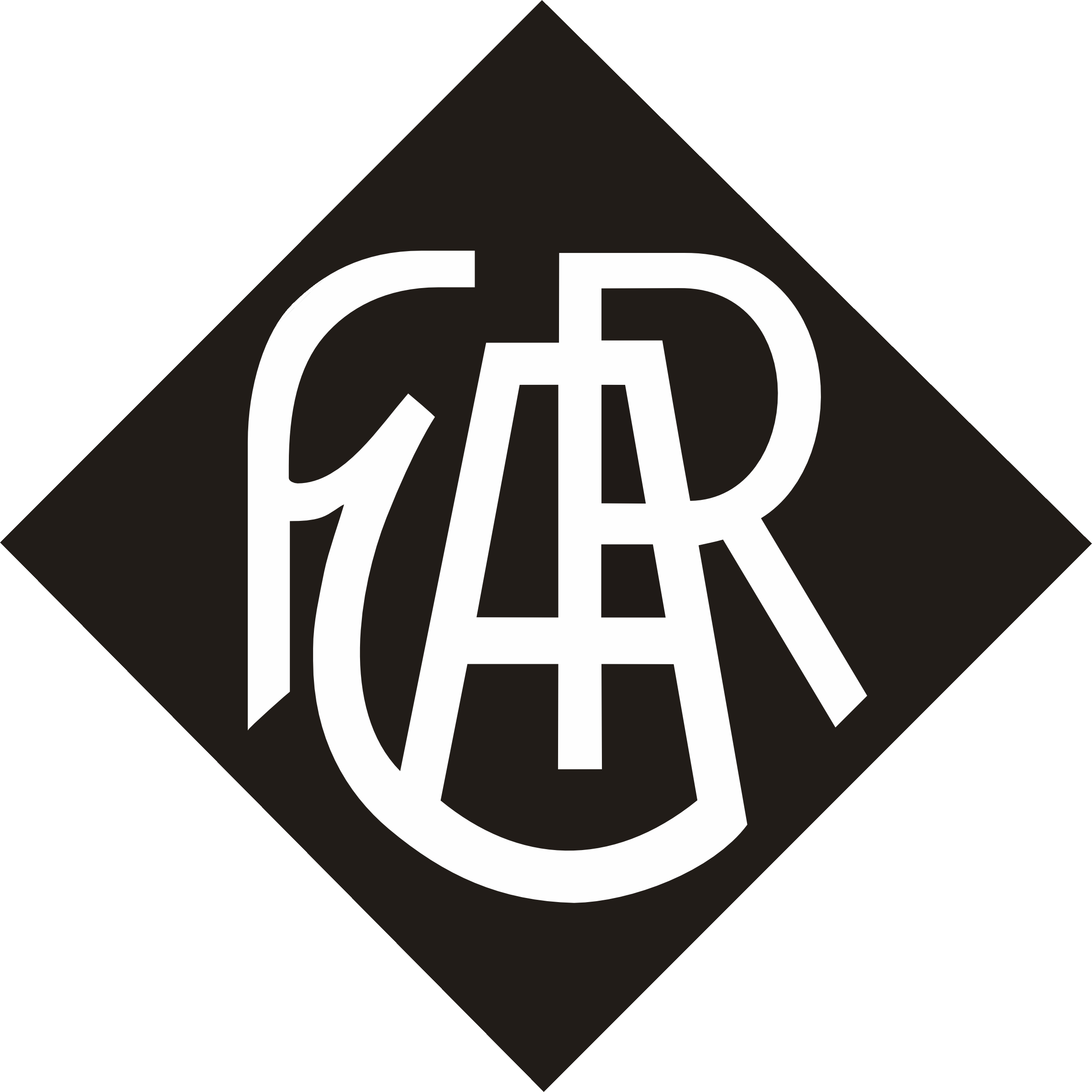
- Full name: Fußballclub Arminia 03 e.V.
- Founded: 1903
- Ground: Bezirkssportanlage Rheingönheim
- Capacity: 2,000
- League: Verbandsliga Südwest (VI)
- 2025–26: Oberliga Rheinland-Pfalz/Saar (V), 15th of 18 (relegated)
| Home colours | Away colours |

Arminia Ludwigshafen is a German association football club from the Rheingönheim of the city of Ludwigshafen am Rhein, Rhineland-Palatinate.

== History ==
The club was founded 1 September 1903 as 1. FC Arminia Rheingönheim and enjoyed some success in local level competition prior to the outbreak of World War I. Under the Nazis it was forced in to a merger with TSG Rheingönheim as part of a process of political consolidation that eliminated worker's clubs like 1. FC, as well as faith-based clubs, as being ideologically unacceptable to the regime. The club was reestablished as VfL Rheingönheim after World War II before once again becoming FC Arminia Rheingönheim on 22 October 1949. In 1969, the association adopted the name of the city of Ludwigshafen.

FC first advanced to the Amateurliga Südwest (III) in 1966 where they would compete for nine seasons with their best result coming as a fourth-place finish in 1969–70. In 1988, after several years in the Bezirksliga Vorderpfalz, Arminia slipped to the Kreisliga and then bounced back and forth between these two levels of play for several seasons. A string of three consecutive promotions saw the club return to the Verbandsliga Südwest (VI) in 2005, and in 2011, they won their way into the Oberliga Südwest (V) for the first time, a league renamed to Oberliga Rheinland-Pfalz/Saar in 2012.

== Honours ==
The club's honours:

=== League ===
- Verbandsliga Südwest (VI)
  - Champions: 2011
- Landesliga Südwest-Ost (VII)
  - Runners-up: 2005
- Bezirksliga Vorderpfalz (VII)
  - Champions: 2004

=== Cup ===
- South West Cup
  - Runners-up: 2013

== Recent seasons ==
The recent season-by-season performance of the club:

| Season | Division | Tier | Position |
|---|---|---|---|
| 2003–04 | Bezirksliga Vorderpfalz | VII | 1st ↑ |
| 2004–05 | Landesliga Südwest-Ost | VI | 2nd ↑ |
| 2005–06 | Verbandsliga Südwest | V | 12th |
| 2006–07 | Verbandsliga Südwest | V | 10th |
| 2007–08 | Verbandsliga Südwest | V | 12th |
| 2008–09 | Verbandsliga Südwest | VI | 7th |
| 2009–10 | Verbandsliga Südwest | VI | 7th |
| 2010–11 | Verbandsliga Südwest | VI | 1st ↑ |
| 2011–12 | Oberliga Südwest | V | 4th |
| 2012–13 | Oberliga Rheinland-Pfalz/Saar | V | 6th |
| 2013–14 | Oberliga Rheinland-Pfalz/Saar | V | 4th |
| 2014–15 | Oberliga Rheinland-Pfalz/Saar | V | 11th |
| 2015–16 | Oberliga Rheinland-Pfalz/Saar | V | 12th |
| 2016–17 | Oberliga Rheinland-Pfalz/Saar | V | |

- With the introduction of the Regionalligas in 1994 and the 3. Liga in 2008 as the new third tier, below the 2. Bundesliga, all leagues below dropped one tier. In 2012 the Oberliga Südwest was renamed Oberliga Rheinland-Pfalz/Saar.

| ↑ Promoted | ↓ Relegated |
