= Kazuya Tsutsui =

Japanese baseball player

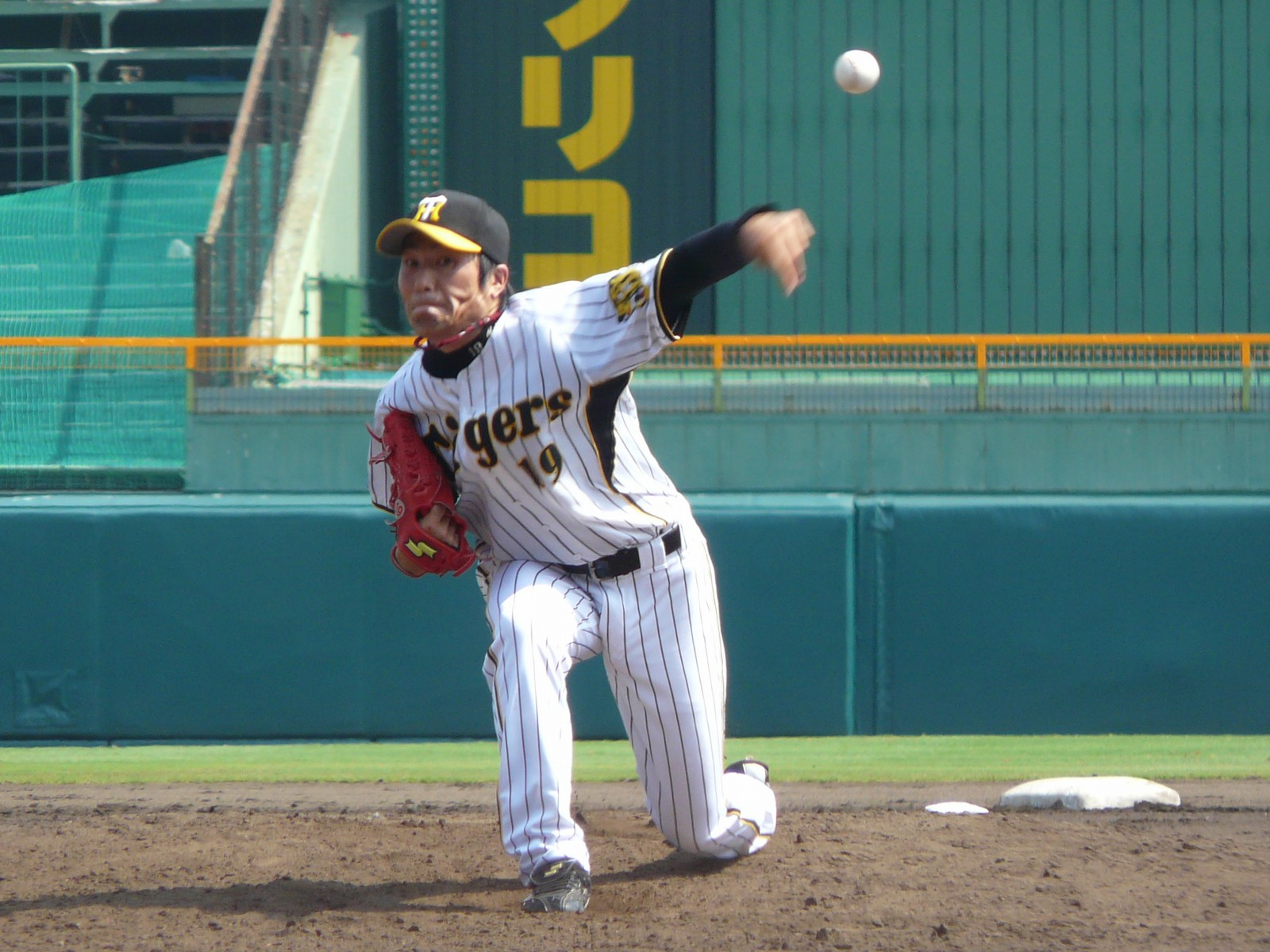
- Tsutsui with the Hanshin Tigers
- Pitcher
- Born: October 5, 1981 (age 44); Iyo, Ehime, Japan
- Batted: Right Threw: Left

NPB debut
- October 7, 2004, for the Hanshin Tigers

Last NPB appearance
- July 3, 2016, for the Hanshin Tigers

NPB statistics
- Win–loss record: 8–6
- Earned run average: 3.87
- Strikeouts: 215

Teams
- Hanshin Tigers (2004–2005, 2007–2016)

Kazuya Tsutsui (筒井 和也, Tsutsui Kazuya; born October 5, 1981) is a Japanese former professional baseball pitcher for the Hanshin Tigers in Japan's Nippon Professional Baseball. He played from 2004 to 2005 and from 2007 to 2016.
