= Kayoko Hoshino =

Japanese ceramicist (born 1949)

Kayoko Hoshino (星野 佳代子, Hoshino Kayoko, born 1949, Kyushu, Japan) is a Japanese ceramicist. Hoshino first developed an interest in ceramics while studying European history in Kyoto, the ceramics capital of Japan. Her work draws inspiration from nature. She says of her process, “I often go for a walk in the mountains around this area as a break between working sessions, and I often feel a longing to express the natural expansiveness and monumentality of the landscape in my work.”

== Works ==
Cutout 11-2, 2011. Collection of the Metropolitan Museum of Art (2015.442.3).

Untitled, 2006. Collection of the Museum of Fine Arts, Boston (2012.637).

== Artistic Process ==
Hoshino mixes red and white clay together by kneading them until she notices the clay creating a uniquely organic form. “Sometimes in the moment when I am kneading I notice that the shape is beautiful, with lovely movement," she says. Upon reaching this moment, she utilizes a wire tool to texturize the surface along the clay body’s contours and to hollow out the piece to accentuate its natural form.
