= Shingo Hoshino =

Japanese footballer

Personal information
- Full name: Shingo Hoshino
- Date of birth: May 2, 1978 (age 48)
- Place of birth: Fukuoka, Japan
- Height: 1.77 m (5 ft 9 1/2 in)
- Position: Defender

Youth career
- 1997–2000: Aichi Gakuin University

Senior career*
Years	Team	Apps	(Gls)
2001–2008	Ehime FC	184	(11)
Total		184	(11)
- * Club domestic league appearances and goals

Shingo Hoshino (星野 真悟, Hoshino Shingo; born May 2, 1978) is a former Japanese football player. Hoshino previously played for Ehime FC in the J2 League.

== Club statistics ==
Club performance			League		Cup		Total	
Season	Club	League	Apps	Goals	Apps	Goals	Apps	Goals
Japan			League		Emperor's Cup		Total	
2001	Ehime FC	Football League	13	1	1	0	14	1
2002	Ehime FC	Football League	15	0	2	0	17	0
2003	Ehime FC	Football League	20	1	0	0	20	1
2004	Ehime FC	Football League	12	4	2	0	14	4
2005	Ehime FC	Football League	28	2	3	1	31	3
2006	Ehime FC	J2 League	40	1	1	0	41	1
2007	Ehime FC	J2 League	38	1	4	1	42	2
2008	Ehime FC	J2 League	18	1	0	0	18	1
Country	Japan		184	11	13	2	197	13
Total			184	11	13	2	197	13
