= List of diplomatic missions in the United States =

Diplomatic relations between world states and the United States United States Countries that have diplomatic relations with the United States Countries that lack diplomatic relations with the United States Disputed territories Antarctica

This is a list of diplomatic missions in the United States. At present, 177 nations maintain diplomatic missions to the United States in the capital, Washington, D.C. Being the seat of the Organization of American States, the city also hosts missions of its member-states, separate from their respective embassies to the United States.

Eight nations also attribute their missions at the United Nations in New York City as their official embassies to the United States. However, only those offices in New York City that serve as an official diplomatic mission to the United States are listed here. For a complete list of diplomatic missions to the United Nations, see List of current permanent representatives to the United Nations.

Only diplomatic missions operated by a foreign country are listed here. Honorary consulates, typically private offices designated to provide limited services on behalf of a foreign country, are not listed.

== Embassies in Washington, D.C. ==
The following 175 countries maintain embassies in Washington, D.C. as their primary diplomatic missions to the United States. Entries marked with an asterisk (*) have chanceries (embassy buildings) located on or near a portion of Massachusetts Avenue known as Embassy Row.

1. Albania
2. Algeria
3. Angola
4. Antigua and Barbuda
5. Argentina
6. Armenia*
7. Australia*
8. Austria
9. Azerbaijan*
10. Bahamas*
11. Bahrain
12. Bangladesh
13. Barbados
14. Belarus
15. Belgium
16. Belize*
17. Benin
18. Bolivia*
19. Bosnia and Herzegovina
20. Botswana
21. Brazil*
22. Brunei
23. Bulgaria*
24. Burkina Faso*
25. Burundi
26. Cambodia
27. Cameroon*
28. Canada
29. Cape Verde*
30. Central African Republic*
31. Chad
32. Chile*
33. China
34. Colombia
35. Congo-Brazzaville
36. Congo-Kinshasa
37. Costa Rica
38. Croatia*
39. Cuba
40. Cyprus*
41. Czech Republic
42. Denmark*
43. Djibouti
44. Dominica
45. Dominican Republic
46. Ecuador
47. Egypt
48. El Salvador
49. Equatorial Guinea
50. Eritrea
51. Estonia*
52. Eswatini
53. Ethiopia
54. Fiji
55. Finland*
56. France
57. Gabon
58. Gambia
59. Georgia*
60. Germany
61. Ghana
62. Greece*
63. Grenada
64. Guatemala*
65. Guinea
66. Guyana
67. Haiti*
68. Holy See*
69. Honduras
70. Hungary
71. Iceland*
72. India*
73. Indonesia*
74. Iraq*
75. Ireland*
76. Israel
77. Italy*
78. Ivory Coast*
79. Jamaica
80. Japan*
81. Jordan
82. Kazakhstan
83. Kenya
84. Kosovo
85. Kuwait
86. Kyrgyzstan*
87. Laos
88. Latvia*
89. Lebanon
90. Lesotho*
91. Liberia
92. Libya
93. Liechtenstein
94. Lithuania
95. Luxembourg*
96. Madagascar*
97. Malawi*
98. Malaysia
99. Maldives
100. Mali
101. Malta
102. Marshall Islands*
103. Mauritania
104. Mauritius
105. Mexico
106. Micronesia
107. Moldova
108. Monaco
109. Mongolia
110. Montenegro
111. Morocco
112. Mozambique
113. Myanmar
114. Namibia
115. Nepal
116. Netherlands
117. New Zealand*
118. Nicaragua
119. Niger*
120. Nigeria
121. North Macedonia
122. Norway*
123. Oman
124. Pakistan
125. Palau
126. Panama
127. Papua New Guinea*
128. Paraguay*
129. Peru*
130. Philippines*
131. Poland
132. Portugal*
133. Qatar
134. Romania*
135. Russia
136. Rwanda
137. Saint Kitts and Nevis
138. Saint Lucia
139. Saint Vincent and the Grenadines
140. Saudi Arabia
141. Senegal
142. Serbia
143. Sierra Leone
144. Singapore
145. Slovakia
146. Slovenia
147. Somalia
148. South Africa*
149. South Korea*
150. South Sudan
151. Spain
152. Sri Lanka
153. Sudan*
154. Suriname
155. Sweden
156. Switzerland
157. Syria
158. Tajikistan
159. Tanzania
160. Thailand
161. Timor-Leste*
162. Togo*
163. Trinidad and Tobago*
164. Tunisia*
165. Turkey*
166. Turkmenistan*
167. Uganda
168. Ukraine
169. United Arab Emirates
170. United Kingdom*
171. Uruguay
172. Uzbekistan*
173. Venezuela
174. Vietnam*
175. Yemen
176. Zambia*
177. Zimbabwe

== Permanent Missions to the Organization of American States (OAS) in Washington, D.C. ==
The following member-states maintain permanent missions to the Organization of American States. Member-states not listed here have their ambassadors to the United States concurrently accredited to the organization

1. Argentina
2. Bolivia
3. Brazil
4. Canada
5. Chile
6. Colombia
7. Costa Rica
8. Dominican Republic
9. Ecuador
10. El Salvador
11. Honduras
12. Guatemala
13. Mexico
14. Panama
15. Paraguay
16. Peru
17. Spain
18. United States
19. Uruguay
20. Venezuela

== Other missions/delegations to the United States in Washington, D.C. ==
The following countries or entities have missions in Washington, D.C., though they may not have full diplomatic relations with the United States government.

=== International Organizations ===
- African Union – General Delegation
- Arab League – Mission
- European Union – Delegation

=== States with no relations ===
Interests sections are provided by protecting powers.

- Iran – Iranian Interests Section, Embassy of Pakistan

=== Governments with limited recognition ===
The United States does not formally recognize the following states.

- Northern Cyprus – Representative Office
- Sahrawi Arab Democratic Republic – Representative Office
- Taiwan – Economic & Cultural Representative Office
- Somaliland – Somaliland Mission USA (located in Alexandria, Virginia)

=== Territories ===
- Bermuda (United Kingdom) – Representative Office
- Catalonia (Spain) – Delegation
- Gibraltar (United Kingdom) – Representative Office
- Greenland (Kingdom of Denmark) – Representative Office
- Hong Kong (China) – Economic & Trade Office
- Iraqi Kurdistan (Iraq) – Representative Office
- Quebec (Canada) – Representative Office
- Scotland (United Kingdom) - Government office
- Wales (United Kingdom) - Government office

=== Other entities ===
- National Unity Government of Myanmar – Liaison Office
- Sovereign Military Order of Malta – Liaison Office
- Central Tibetan Administration – Office of Tibet

== Missions in New York City ==
New York City, the largest city in the United States, is home to the General Assembly of the United Nations, and all 195 member and observer states send permanent delegations. Nine diplomatic missions in New York City listed below are also formally accredited as each country's official embassy to the United States. There are 110 missions in the city. All are consulates-general unless otherwise noted.

1. Albania
2. Algeria
3. Angola
4. Antigua and Barbuda
5. Argentina
6. Armenia
7. Australia
8. Austria
9. Bahamas
10. Bahrain
11. Bangladesh
12. Barbados
13. Belgium
14. Bhutan
15. Bolivia
16. Brazil
17. Bulgaria
18. Burkina Faso
19. Canada
20. Chile
21. China
22. Colombia
23. Costa Rica
24. Croatia
25. Cyprus
26. Czech Republic
27. Denmark
28. Dominica
29. Dominican Republic
30. Ecuador
31. Egypt
32. El Salvador
33. Finland
34. France
35. Gabon (Consulate)
36. Georgia
37. Germany
38. Ghana
39. Greece
40. Grenada
41. Guatemala
42. Guyana
43. Haiti
44. Honduras
45. Hong Kong, China (Economic and Trade Office)
46. Hungary
47. India
48. Indonesia
49. Ireland
50. Israel
51. Italy
52. Ivory Coast
53. Jamaica
54. Japan
55. Kazakhstan
56. Kenya
57. Kosovo
58. Kuwait
59. Lebanon
60. Lithuania
61. Luxembourg
62. Malaysia
63. Mexico
64. Monaco
65. Montenegro
66. Morocco
67. Nepal
68. Netherlands
69. New Zealand
70. Nicaragua
71. Nigeria
72. Northern Cyprus (Representative Office)
73. North Macedonia
74. Norway
75. Pakistan
76. Panama
77. Paraguay
78. Peru
79. Philippines
80. Poland
81. Portugal
82. Qatar
83. Romania
84. Russia
85. Saint Kitts and Nevis
86. Saint Lucia
87. Saint Vincent and the Grenadines
88. Saudi Arabia
89. Senegal
90. Serbia
91. Singapore (Consulate)
92. Slovakia
93. Somalia
94. South Africa
95. South Korea
96. Spain
97. Sri Lanka
98. Sweden
99. Switzerland
100. Taiwan (Economic & Cultural Office)
101. Thailand
102. Trinidad and Tobago
103. Turkey
104. Ukraine
105. United Arab Emirates
106. United Kingdom
107. Uruguay
108. Uzbekistan
109. Vietnam

== Cities with ten or more consular missions ==
The following major cities are host to career consular missions; all of whom are consulates-general unless indicated otherwise.

=== Los Angeles, California ===
Los Angeles, the second-largest city in the United States, is home to 63 consular missions, more than any other city on the West Coast and any U.S. city except Washington, D.C. and New York City. Many of these consulates are located along Wilshire Boulevard.

1. Argentina
2. Armenia
3. Australia
4. Austria
5. Azerbaijan
6. Bahamas
7. Bangladesh
8. Belgium
9. Belize
10. Bolivia
11. Brazil
12. Bulgaria
13. Canada
14. Chile
15. China
16. Colombia
17. Costa Rica
18. Croatia
19. Czechia
20. Dominican Republic
21. Ecuador (Consulate)
22. Egypt
23. El Salvador
24. Finland
25. France
26. Germany
27. Greece
28. Guatemala
29. Honduras
30. Hungary
31. India
32. Indonesia
33. Iraq
34. Ireland
35. Israel
36. Italy
37. Japan
38. Kenya
39. Kuwait
40. Lebanon
41. Lithuania
42. Malaysia
43. Mexico
44. Myanmar
45. New Zealand
46. Pakistan
47. Panama
48. Paraguay
49. Peru
50. Philippines (article)
51. Poland
52. Qatar
53. Romania
54. Saint Kitts and Nevis
55. Saudi Arabia
56. South Africa
57. South Korea
58. Spain
59. Sri Lanka
60. Taiwan (Economic & Cultural Office)
61. Thailand
62. Turkey
63. United Arab Emirates
64. United Kingdom

=== Chicago, Illinois ===
Chicago, the third largest city in the United States and the largest in the midwestern region of the country, is home to 50 missions, the fourth-most after Washington, D.C., New York and Los Angeles.

1. Argentina
2. Australia
3. Bosnia and Herzegovina
4. Brazil
5. Bulgaria
6. Canada
7. Chile
8. China
9. Colombia
10. Croatia
11. Czechia
12. Denmark
13. Dominican Republic
14. Ecuador
15. Egypt
16. El Salvador
17. France
18. Germany
19. Greece
20. Guatemala
21. Haiti
22. Honduras
23. Hungary
24. India
25. Indonesia
26. Ireland
27. Israel
28. Italy
29. Japan
30. Kyrgyzstan
31. Lithuania
32. Mexico
33. Moldova
34. Mongolia
35. Netherlands
36. North Macedonia
37. Pakistan
38. Peru
39. Philippines
40. Poland
41. Romania
42. Serbia
43. South Korea
44. Spain
45. Switzerland
46. Taiwan (Economic & Cultural Office)
47. Thailand
48. Turkey
49. Ukraine
50. United Kingdom

=== Miami, Florida ===
Miami is home to 47 missions. Due to its location, many Latin American and Caribbean countries maintain consulates there.

1. Antigua and Barbuda
2. Argentina
3. Bahamas
4. Bangladesh
5. Barbados
6. Bolivia
7. Brazil
8. Canada
9. Chile
10. Colombia
11. Costa Rica
12. Czechia
13. Dominican Republic
14. Ecuador (Consulate)
15. El Salvador (Note: Although officially titled as a consulate-general in Miami, it is physically located in the adjacent city of Doral, which forms part of the Miami-Dade County.)
16. France
17. Germany
18. Grenada
19. Guatemala
20. Haiti
21. Honduras
22. Hungary (Vice-consulate)
23. Ireland
24. Israel
25. Italy
26. Jamaica
27. Japan
28. Mexico
29. Morocco
30. Netherlands
31. Nicaragua
32. Panama
33. Paraguay
34. Peru
35. Romania
36. Saint Lucia (Note: Although officially titled as a consulate-general in Miami, it is physically located in the adjacent city of Coral Gables, which forms part of the Miami-Dade County.)
37. Sierra Leone
38. Spain
39. Suriname
40. Taiwan (Economic & Cultural Office)
41. Trinidad and Tobago
42. Turkey
43. United Arab Emirates
44. United Kingdom
45. Uruguay

=== Houston, Texas ===
Houston is the fourth largest city in the United States and is home to 48 missions.

1. Angola
2. Argentina
3. Australia
4. Bolivia
5. Brazil
6. Chile
7. Colombia
8. Costa Rica
9. Denmark
10. Dominican Republic
11. Ecuador
12. Egypt
13. El Salvador
14. Equatorial Guinea(article)
15. Finland
16. France
17. Germany
18. Greece (Consulate)
19. Guatemala
20. Honduras
21. Hungary (Vice-consulate)
22. India
23. Indonesia (article)
24. Iraq
25. Israel
26. Italy
27. Japan (article)
28. Kazakhstan
29. Kuwait
30. Mexico
31. Pakistan
32. Panama
33. Peru
34. Philippines (article)
35. Poland
36. Qatar
37. Russia(article)
38. Saudi Arabia
39. South Korea
40. Spain
41. Sweden(article)
42. Taiwan (Economic & Cultural Office)
43. Turkey
44. Ukraine
45. United Arab Emirates
46. United Kingdom
47. Vietnam

=== San Francisco, California ===
San Francisco is home to 45 missions.

1. Algeria
2. Australia
3. Austria (Consulate)
4. Brazil
5. Canada
6. Chile
7. China
8. Colombia
9. El Salvador
10. European Union (Delegation Office)
11. France
12. Georgia
13. Germany
14. Greece
15. Guatemala
16. Honduras
17. Hong Kong, China (Economic and Trade Office)
18. India
19. Indonesia
20. Ireland
21. Israel
22. Italy
23. Japan
24. Kazakhstan
25. Luxembourg
26. Mexico
27. Mongolia
28. Nepal
29. Netherlands
30. Norway
31. Peru
32. Philippines(article)
33. Portugal
34. Singapore
35. South Korea
36. Spain
37. Sweden(article)
38. Switzerland
39. Taiwan (Economic & Cultural Office)
40. Tonga (Note: Although officially titled as a consulate-general in San Francisco, it is physically located in the nearby city of Burlingame, which forms part of the San Francisco Bay area.)
41. Ukraine
42. United Kingdom
43. Uruguay
44. Vietnam

=== Atlanta, Georgia ===
Atlanta is home to 26 missions.

1. Argentina
2. Bahamas
3. Belgium
4. Brazil
5. Canada
6. Colombia
7. Costa Rica
8. Ecuador
9. France
10. Germany
11. Greece (Consulate)
12. Guatemala
13. Haiti
14. Honduras
15. India
16. Ireland
17. Israel
18. Japan(article)
19. Mexico
20. Netherlands
21. Nigeria
22. Peru
23. South Korea
24. Switzerland
25. Taiwan (Economic & Cultural Office)
26. United Kingdom

=== Boston, Massachusetts ===
The Boston area of New England is home to 26 foreign missions.

1. Brazil
2. Canada
3. Cape Verde (Consulate General)
4. Colombia (Consulate General)
5. Dominican Republic
6. El Salvador
7. France
8. Germany
9. Greece
10. Haiti
11. Honduras
12. India
13. Ireland (Consulate General)
14. Israel
15. Italy
16. Japan
17. Mexico
18. Peru (Consulate General)
19. Portugal
20. South Korea (located in Newton)
21. Spain
22. Switzerland (Consulate; located in Cambridge)
23. Taiwan (Economic & Cultural Office)
24. Turkey
25. United Arab Emirates
26. United Kingdom (located in Cambridge)

=== Seattle, Washington ===
Seattle is home to 12 missions.

1. Canada
2. El Salvador
3. Guatemala
4. Honduras
5. India
6. Japan
7. Mexico (Consulate)
8. Philippines
9. South Korea
10. Taiwan (Economic & Cultural Office)
11. United Kingdom (Government office)
12. Uzbekistan

== Other cities with consular missions ==
Other cities have few consulates, which are often from Mexico, El Salvador, Guatemala, Canada, Japan, Honduras, or Peru.

=== Aurora, Colorado ===
1. El Salvador
2. Honduras

=== Anchorage, Alaska ===
1. Japan (Consular office)
2. South Korea (Consulate)

=== Austin, Texas ===
1. Ireland
2. Mexico

=== Charlotte, North Carolina ===
1. El Salvador
2. Honduras

=== Cleveland, Ohio ===
1. Slovenia

=== Columbus, Ohio ===
1. Guatemala
2. El Salvador (Consulate-General)

=== Dallas, Texas ===
1. Canada
2. El Salvador
3. Guatemala (Consulate)
4. Honduras
5. Mexico(article)
6. Nepal
7. Peru
8. South Korea (Consulate)

=== Del Rio, Texas ===
1. Guatemala (Consulate)
2. Mexico (Consulate)

=== Des Moines, Iowa ===
1. Kosovo (Consulate)

=== Denver, Colorado ===
1. Canada
2. Guatemala
3. Japan
4. Mexico
5. Peru
6. Taiwan (Economic & Cultural Office)
7. United Kingdom (Government office)

=== Detroit, Michigan ===
1. Canada
2. Iraq
3. Italy (Consulate)
4. Japan(article)
5. Lebanon (Note: Although officially titled as a consulate-general in Detroit, it is physically located in the adjacent city of Southfield, which forms part of Metro Detroit.)
6. Mexico (Consulate)
7. North Macedonia (Consulate)

=== Duluth, Georgia ===
1. El Salvador (Consulate-General)

=== El Paso, Texas ===
1. El Salvador
2. Mexico

=== Elizabeth, New Jersey ===
1. El Salvador

=== Fresno, California ===
1. El Salvador
2. Mexico (Consulate)

=== Hartford, Connecticut ===
1. Brazil
2. Peru (Consulate General)

=== Honolulu, Hawaii ===
1. Australia
2. Japan (article)
3. Marshall Islands
4. Micronesia
5. New Zealand
6. Philippines (article)
7. South Korea
8. Taiwan (Economic & Cultural Office)

=== Irving, Texas ===
1. Honduras

=== Lake Worth Beach, Florida ===
1. Guatemala (Consulate)

=== Las Vegas, Nevada ===
1. El Salvador
2. Guatemala
3. Mexico (Consulate)

=== Long Island City, New York ===
1. Ecuador

=== Mayagüez, Puerto Rico ===
1. Dominican Republic

=== McAllen, Texas ===
1. El Salvador
2. Guatemala (Consulate)
3. Honduras
4. Mexico (Consulate)

=== Minneapolis, Minnesota ===
1. Canada
2. Ecuador (Consulate)
3. United Kingdom (Government office)

=== Nashville, Tennessee ===
1. El Salvador (Consulate-General)
2. Japan (Consulate-General)
3. Guatemala (Consulate-General)

=== Newark, New Jersey ===
1. Colombia (Consulate General)
2. Ecuador
3. Portugal (Consulate General)

=== New Bedford, Massachusetts ===
1. Portugal (Consulate)

=== New Haven, Connecticut ===
1. Ecuador

=== New Orleans, Louisiana ===
1. Dominican Republic
2. France
3. Honduras
4. Mexico (Consulate)
5. Panama

=== Oklahoma City, Oklahoma ===
1. Guatemala
2. Mexico (Consulate)

=== Omaha, Nebraska ===
1. El Salvador (Consulate-General)
2. Mexico (Consulate)
3. Guatemala

=== Orlando, Florida ===
1. Brazil
2. Colombia (Consulate)
3. Dominican Republic
4. Haiti (Consulate)
5. Mexico (Consulate)
6. Peru

=== Pago Pago, American Samoa ===
1. Samoa

=== Palo Alto, California ===
1. Denmark (Consulate-General)

=== Paterson, New Jersey ===
1. Dominican Republic
2. Peru

=== Philadelphia, Pennsylvania ===
1. Dominican Republic
2. Guatemala
3. Italy
4. Mexico (Consulate)
5. Panama
6. South Korea (Consulate)

=== Phoenix, Arizona ===
1. Ecuador (Consulate General)
2. Guatemala (Consulate General)
3. Honduras (Consulate General)
4. Mexico (Consulate General)
5. Peru (Consulate General)
6. Taiwan (Economic & Cultural Office)

=== Pittsburgh, Pennsylvania ===
1. Honduras (Consulate General)

=== Plainview, New York ===
1. El Salvador

=== Portland, Oregon ===
1. Japan (Consular office)
2. Marshall Islands
3. Micronesia
4. Mexico (Consulate)

=== Providence, Rhode Island ===
1. Guatemala
2. Portugal (Consulate)

=== Raleigh, North Carolina ===
1. Guatemala
2. Mexico

=== Riverhead, New York ===
1. Guatemala (Consulate)

=== Rockville, Maryland ===
1. Guatemala

=== Sacramento, California ===
1. Moldova
2. Mexico

=== Saint Paul, Minnesota ===
1. El Salvador
2. Mexico (Consulate)

=== Saipan, Northern Mariana Islands ===
1. Japan (Consular Office)
2. Palau

=== Salt Lake City, Utah ===
1. El Salvador
2. Mexico (Consulate)
3. Peru

=== San Antonio, Texas ===
1. El Salvador
2. Mexico

=== San Bernardino, California ===
1. El Salvador (Consulate General)
2. Guatemala (Consulate)
3. Mexico (Consulate)

=== San Diego, California ===
1. Mexico (Consulate-General)
2. United Kingdom (UK Government Office)

=== San Juan, Puerto Rico ===
1. Colombia
2. Dominican Republic
3. Mexico
4. Spain

=== Silver Spring, Maryland ===
1. El Salvador

=== Springdale, Arkansas ===
1. El Salvador
2. Marshall Islands

=== Tampa, Florida ===
1. Greece
2. Honduras
3. Panama

=== Tamuning, Guam ===
1. Japan
2. Micronesia
3. Palau
4. Philippines
5. South Korea (Consulate)
6. Taiwan (Economic & Cultural Office)

=== Tucson, Arizona ===
1. El Salvador
2. Guatemala (Consulate)
3. Mexico

=== Woodbridge, Virginia ===
1. El Salvador

=== Cities with Mexican consulates only (18) ===
Due to the large number of Mexican immigrants in the United States, Mexico has 52 consular missions in the United States, more than any sending country has with any other host country. Many of these are smaller cities in the southwestern United States, including a number of border towns.

1. Albuquerque, New Mexico (Consulate)
2. (Mexico) Boise, Idaho (Consulate)
3. (Mexico) Brownsville, Texas (Consulate)
4. (Mexico) Calexico, California (Consulate)
5. (Mexico) Douglas, Arizona (Consulate)
6. (Mexico) Eagle Pass, Texas (Consulate)
7. (Mexico) Indianapolis, Indiana (Consulate)
8. (Mexico) Kansas City, Missouri (Consulate)
9. (Mexico) Laredo, Texas (Consulate-General)
10. (Mexico) Little Rock, Arkansas (Consulate)
11. (Mexico) Milwaukee, Wisconsin (Consulate)
12. (Mexico) New Brunswick, New Jersey (Consulate)
13. (Mexico) Nogales, Arizona (Consulate-General)
14. (Mexico) Oxnard, California (Consulate)
15. (Mexico) Presidio, Texas (Consulate)
16. (Mexico) San Jose, California (Consulate-General)
17. (Mexico) Santa Ana, California (Consulate)
18. (Mexico) Yuma, Arizona (Consulate)

== Countries without formal diplomatic missions to the United States ==
Several countries do not have formal diplomatic missions accredited to the United States. Consular duties for each country—except Afghanistan, Kiribati, and non-UN members—are instead managed by their respective diplomatic missions to the United Nations in New York.

=== States with relations ===
Resident in New York unless otherwise stated.

- Afghanistan (Resident in Ottawa)
- Andorra
- Comoros
- Guinea-Bissau
- Kiribati
- Nauru
- San Marino
- São Tomé and Príncipe
- Seychelles
- Solomon Islands
- Tuvalu
- Vanuatu

=== States with no relations ===
- Bhutan
- Iran (Interests Section in the Pakistani Embassy, Washington, DC)
- North Korea
- Palestine (UN observer, not recognized by US)

=== States with limited recognition ===
The United States does not recognize the following states.

- Abkhazia
- South Ossetia
- Transnistria

=== Non-Independent Territories ===
- Cook Islands
- Niue

== Closed missions ==
Host city	Sending country	Mission	Year closed	Ref.
Washington, D.C.	Afghanistan (Note: Closed in the wake of the takeover of Afghanistan by the Taliban)	Embassy (Note: Resident in Ottawa, Ontario, Canada)	2022	
Washington, D.C.	East Germany	Embassy (Note: The East German embassy was closed upon the reunification of Germany in 1990.)	1990	
Washington, D.C.	Guinea-Bissau	Embassy	2007	
Washington, D.C.	Iran	Embassy	1980	
Washington, D.C.	PLO	General Delegation	2018	
Washington, D.C.	São Tomé and Príncipe	Embassy	Unknown	
Washington, D.C.	South Vietnam (Note: The South Vietnamese embassy was closed upon the fall of Saigon in April 1975, thus marking the end of the Vietnam War and the start of a transition period to the formal reunification of Vietnam.)	Embassy	1975	
Washington, D.C.	Taiwan	Embassy	1979	
Anchorage	Mexico	Consulate	2015	
Atlanta	Australia	Consulate-General	2012	
Baltimore	Argentina	Consulate	1990	
Baltimore	Colombia	Consulate	1987	
Baltimore	Cuba	Consulate	1961	
Boston	Cuba	Consulate-General	1961	
Buffalo, NY	Canada	Consulate	2012	
Chicago	Austria	Consulate	2013	
Chicago	Cuba	Consulate	1961	
Chicago	Iran	Consulate-General	1980	
Chicago	Sweden	Consulate-General	1993	
Chicago	Uruguay	Consulate-General	2021	
Chicago	Venezuela	Consulate-General	2021	
Cincinnati	Cuba	Consulate	1957	
Cleveland	Italy	Consulate	1980	
Cleveland	United Kingdom	Consulate	1999	
Corpus Christi	Mexico	Consulate	2002	
Dallas	United Kingdom	Consulate	2005	
Denver	France	Consulate	1969	
Denver	India	Consulate	2003	
Detroit	Colombia	Consulate	1994	
Detroit	Cuba	Consulate	1958	
Detroit	Polish People's Republic	Consulate-General	1958	
Fort Lauderdale	Colombia	Consulate	1988	
Galveston	Cuba	Consulate	1960	
Honolulu	Cuba	Consulate	1932	
Honolulu	France	Consulate-General	1996	
Houston	China	Consulate-General	2020	
Houston	Cuba	Consulate	1960	
Houston	Iran	Consulate-General	1980	
Houston	Norway	Consulate-General	2023	
Houston	Nicaragua	Consulate-General	2024	
Houston	Switzerland	Consulate-General	2006	
Jacksonville	Cuba	Consulate	1960	
Kansas City	Cuba	Consulate	1957	
Kansas City	Japan	Consulate-General	2004	
Key West	Cuba	Consulate	1961	
Los Angeles	Afghanistan	Consulate-General	2022	
Los Angeles	Angola	Consulate-General	2018	
Los Angeles	Cuba	Consulate-General	1961	
Los Angeles	Ethiopia	Consulate-General	2021	
Los Angeles	Nicaragua	Consulate-General	2024	
Los Angeles	Slovakia	Consulate-General	2013	
Los Angeles	Sweden	Consulate-General	2009	
Los Angeles	Switzerland	Consulate-General	2018	
Los Angeles	Uruguay	Consulate-General	2021	
Miami	Belgium	Consulate	2007	
Miami	Cuba	Consulate-General	1961	
Miami	Egypt	Consulate-General	2015	
Miami	Lebanon	Consulate-General	Unknown	
Miami	Norway	Consulate-General	2003	
Miami	South Korea	Consulate-General	1999	
Miami	Venezuela	Consulate-General	2012	
Midland	Mexico	Consulate	2002	
Minneapolis	Norway	Consulate-General	2008	
Minneapolis	Sweden	Consulate-General	1989	
Mobile	Cuba	Consulate	1961	
New Orleans	Colombia	Consulate-General	2002	
New Orleans	Cuba	Consulate General	1961	
New Orleans	Greece	Consulate	Unknown	
New Orleans	Italy	Consulate-General	1997	
New Orleans	Japan	Consulate-General	2008	
New Orleans	Nicaragua	Consulate-General	2024	
New Orleans	Philippines	Consulate-General	1985	
New Orleans	Spain	Consulate-General	2009	
New Orleans	Venezuela	Consulate-General	2023	
New York City	Afghanistan	Consulate-General	2022	
New York City	Belarus	Consulate-General	2021	
New York City	Benin	Consulate-General	2019	
New York City	Cuba	Consulate-General	1961	
New York City	Iran	Consulate-General	1980	
New York City	Slovenia	Consulate-General	2012	
New York City	Suriname	Consulate-General	1984	
New York City	Venezuela	Consulate-General	2023	
Newark	Italy	Consulate	2014	
Norfolk	Cuba	Consulate	1961	
Orlando	United Kingdom	Consulate	2014	
Philadelphia	Canada	Consulate-General	2012	
Philadelphia	Colombia	Consulate	1987	
Philadelphia	Cuba	Consulate-General	1961	
Philadelphia	Dominican Republic	Consulate-General	2006	
Philadelphia	Israel	Consulate-General	2016	
Philadelphia	Portugal	Consulate-General	2010	
Philadelphia	United Kingdom	Consulate-General	1998	
Philadelphia	Venezuela	Consulate-General	2010	
Pittsburgh	Polish People's Republic	Consulate	1950	
Saint Louis	Cuba	Consulate	1960	
Saint Paul	Ethiopia	Consulate-General	2021	
Saipan, Northern Mariana Islands	Philippines	Consulate-General	2012	
San Francisco	Cuba	Consulate-General	1961	
San Francisco	Egypt	Consulate-General	2014	
San Francisco	Iran	Consulate-General	1980	
San Francisco	Nigeria	Consulate-General	1989	
San Francisco	Russia	Consulate-General	2017	
San Francisco	Venezuela	Consulate-General	2023	
San Juan, Puerto Rico	Cuba	Consulate-General	1960	
San Juan, Puerto Rico	France	Consulate	1996	
San Juan, Puerto Rico	Panama	Consulate-General	Unknown	
San Juan, Puerto Rico	United Kingdom	Consulate	2005	
San Juan, Puerto Rico	Venezuela	Consulate-General	2023	
Santa Ana	El Salvador	Consulate	2011	
Savannah	Cuba	Consulate	1961	
Seattle	Colombia	Consulate	1922	
Seattle	Germany	Consulate	2000	
Seattle	Russia	Consulate-General	2018	
Tacoma	Empire of Japan	Consulate	1901	
Tampa	Colombia	Consulate	1990	
Tampa	Cuba	Consulate-General	1960	

== See also ==
- Foreign policy of the United States
- List of diplomatic missions of the United States
- Ambassadors of the United States
- List of ambassadors to the United States
- Visa requirements for United States citizens
- Timeline of United States diplomatic relations
