= Taipei Economic and Cultural Office, San Francisco =

Political representative office in California

Taipei Economic and Cultural Office in San Francisco 駐舊金山臺北經濟文化辦事處
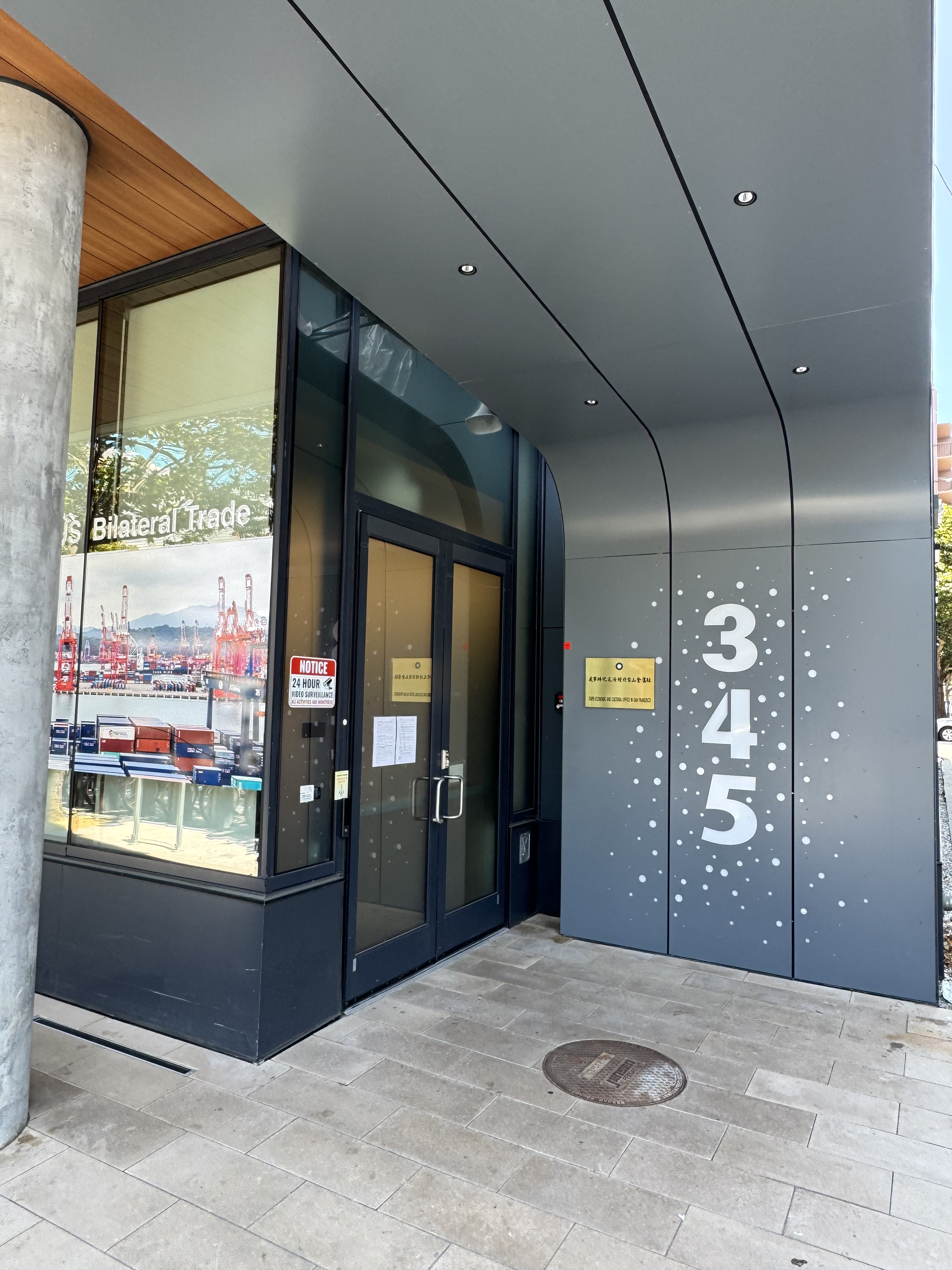
- 345 4th Street where the office is located

Agency overview
- Formed: 1 March 1979 (as the San Francisco Office of the Coordination Council for North American Affairs)
- Headquarters: 345 4th Street, San Francisco, California
- Agency executive: David C.H. Wu, Director-General
- Website: Official website

Taipei Economic and Cultural Office in San Francisco (TECO-San Francisco, Chinese: 駐舊金山臺北經濟文化辦事處; pinyin: Zhù Jiùjīnshān Táiběi jīngjì wénhuà bànshì chǔ) represents the interests of Taiwan in the western United States, functioning as a de facto consulate. The mission is located in the SoMa in San Francisco. It also oversees Cultural Centers in Chinatown, San Francisco and Milpitas, California. The mission serves Northern California, Nevada and Utah.

== Background ==
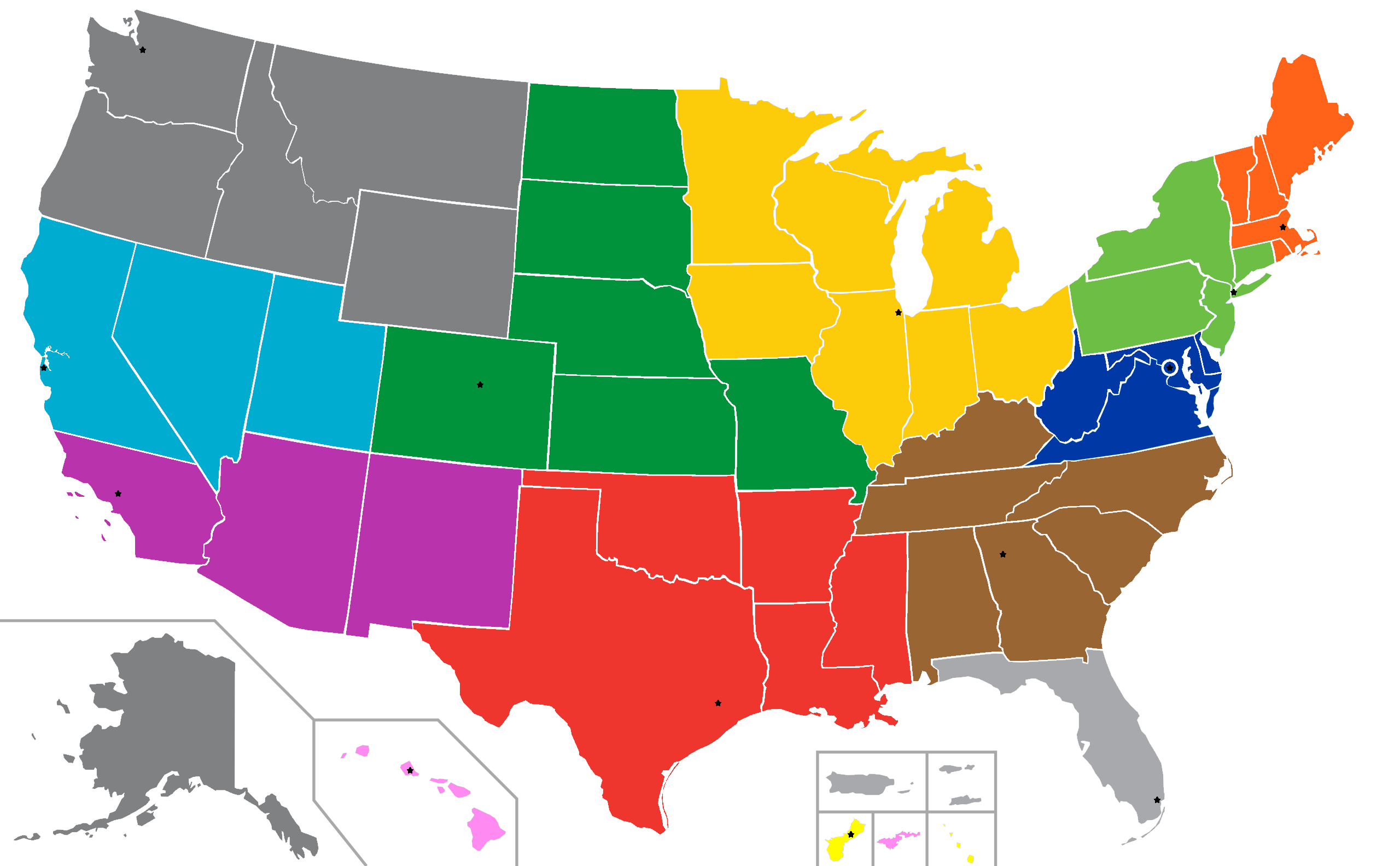
Consular district of TECO San Francisco

Following the signing of the Joint Communiqué on the Establishment of Diplomatic Relations between the United States and the People's Republic of China which resulted in the United States terminating diplomatic relations with the Republic of China, the Consulate General of the Republic of China in San Francisco was closed on 28 February 1979. On 1 March 1979, the Coordination Council for North American Affairs of the Ministry of Foreign Affairs of the Republic of China established the San Francisco Office of the Coordination Council for North American Affairs. It was finally renamed the Taipei Economic and Cultural Office in San Francisco on 10 October 1996.

Since August 2020, the office is headed by a director-general, currently Ming-Chi Scott Lai, who previously served as director-general of Taipei Economic and Cultural Office in Boston.

In 2023, Taiwan purchased a brand new seven-story building at 345 4th Street for $52.8 million. After renovations had completed on 17 October 2024, the office with its consular, economic, education and tourism division were all relocated to the fully owned, brand new building.

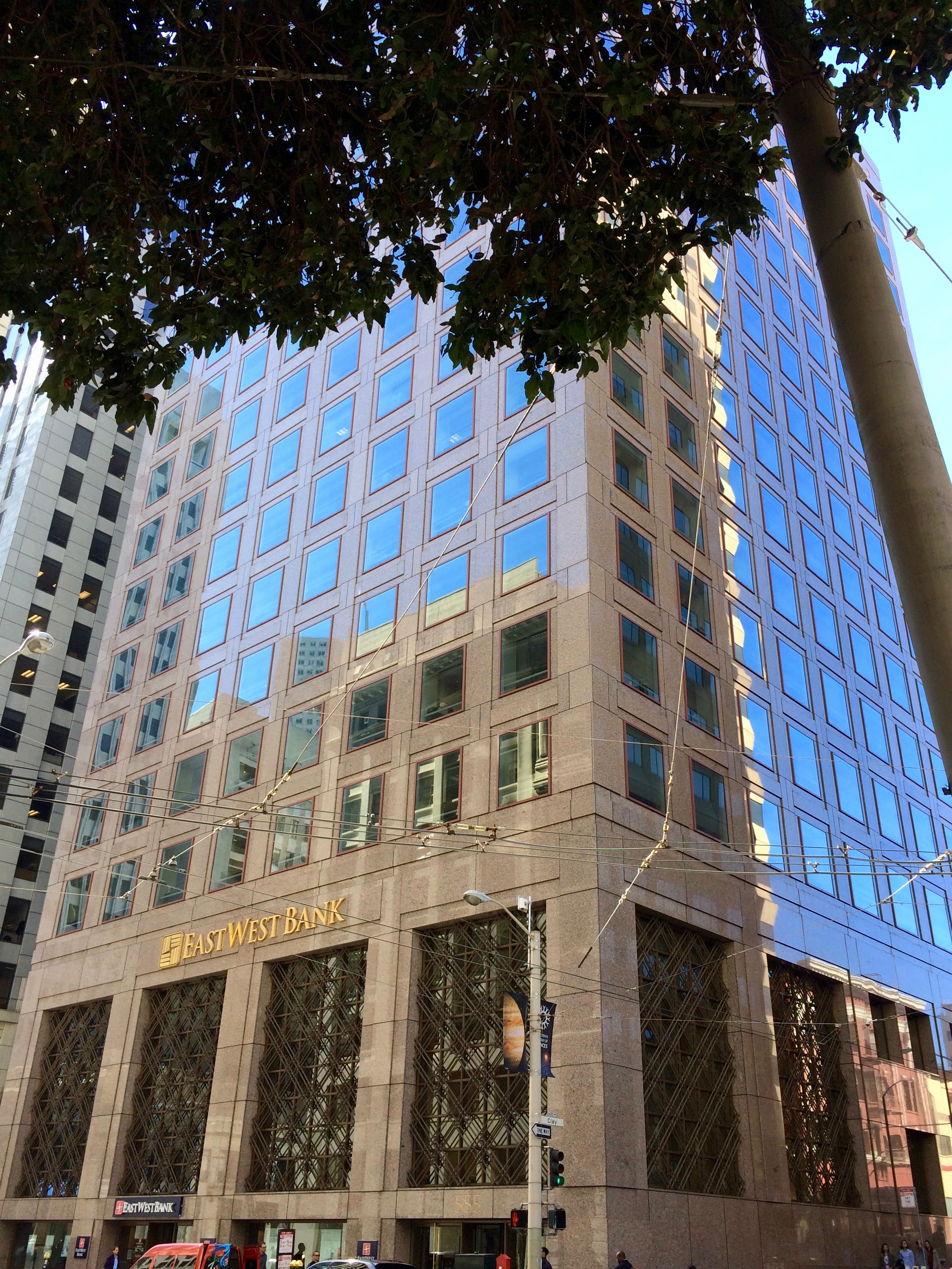
East West Bank building at 555 Montgomery Street where the office was previously located

== See also ==
- Taipei Economic and Cultural Representative Office in the United States
- Diplomatic missions of the Republic of China
