= Consulate General of the Philippines, Hagåtña =

Diplomatic mission of the Philippines in Hagåtña, Guam, United States

Consulate General of the Philippines, Hagåtña Konsuladong Panlahat ng Pilipinas sa Agana Konsulådu Henerat Filipinas, Guåhan

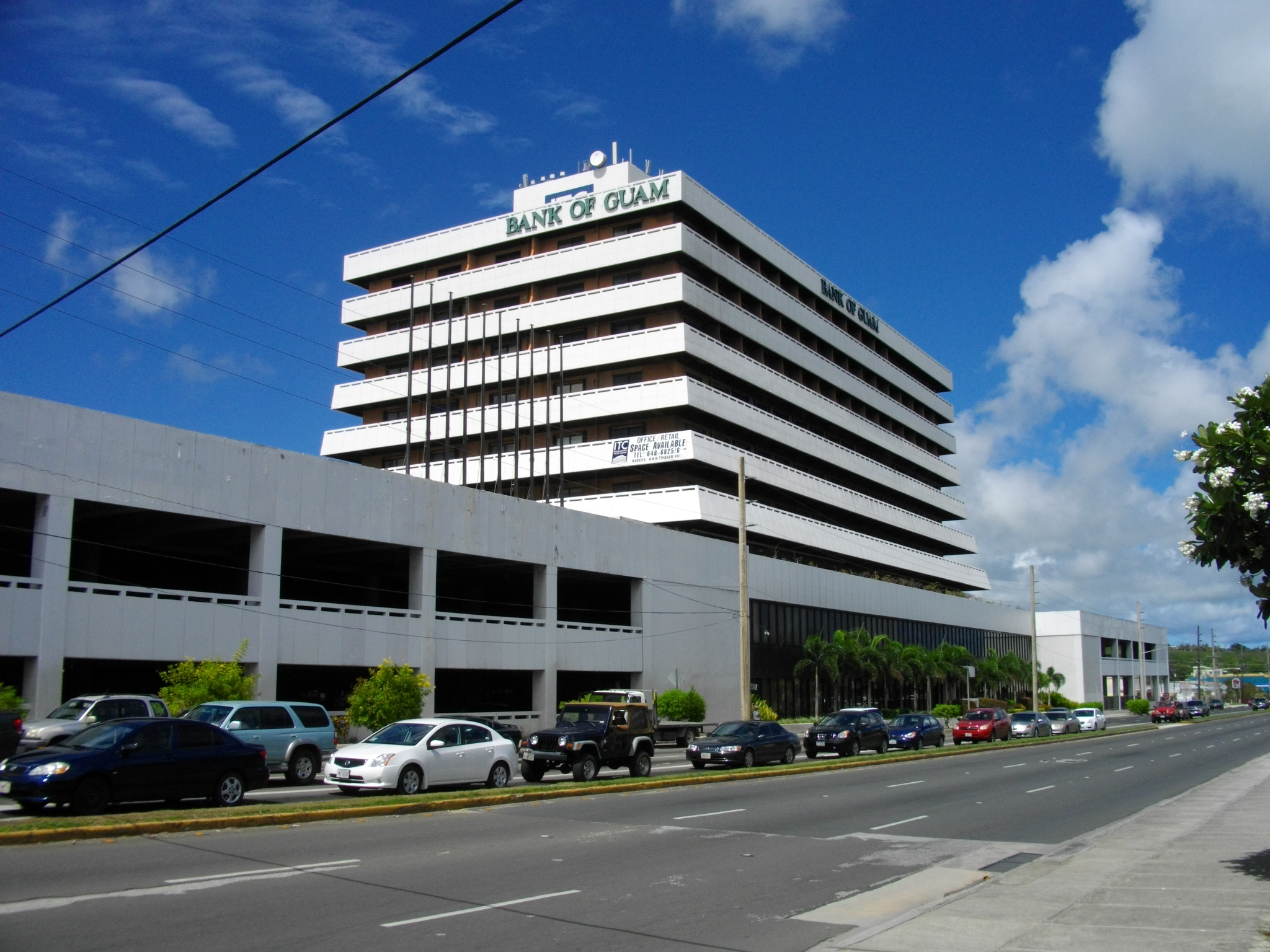
- Location: Guam
- Address: 590 South Marine Corps Drive, Suite 601A, Tamuning
- Coordinates: 13°29′12.3″N 144°46′58.9″E
- Consul General: Rosario P. Lemque
- Website: aganapcg.dfa.gov.ph

The Consulate General of the Philippines in Hagåtña (officially the Consulate General of the Philippines in Agana) is a diplomatic mission of the Republic of the Philippines in the United States, representing the country's interests on the island of Guam. Opened in 1952, it is located on the sixth floor of the Guam International Trade Center, located east of the territorial capital Hagåtña (Agana) along Guam Highway 1 (Marine Corps Drive) in the adjacent village of Tamuning.

== History ==
The Philippine diplomatic presence on Guam dates back to 1945, before the Philippines achieved independence from the United States. In 1945, the government of the then-Commonwealth of the Philippines established an honorary consulate on Guam, led by Eduardo Xauduro as honorary consul.

Following Philippine independence, the honorary consulate on Guam was placed under the ultimate jurisdiction of the Philippine Consulate General in Honolulu, which in addition to Guam also covered the Northern Mariana Islands. This was then replaced with the opening of a career consulate on August 3, 1952, with President Elpidio Quirino appointing Bartolome A. Umayam as the first career consul to the territory a few months before. The mission was upgraded to a consulate general in 1964.

During the run-up to the People Power Revolution in 1986, consul Ben Hur Ong, the mission's second-in-command, declared that he would recognize the election of Corazon Aquino as president despite his boss, consul-general Carlos Martinez, announcing just a few minutes before that the mission would wait for more information before deciding on whom it would recognize as the legitimate Philippine president.

The Northern Mariana Islands was separated from the Guam mission's jurisdiction with the opening of the Philippine Consulate General in Saipan in 1989. However, following a massive expansion of the Philippines' diplomatic presence abroad during the presidency of Gloria Macapagal Arroyo, in 2010 Senator Franklin Drilon called for a review of the Philippines' diplomatic presence worldwide. This would lead to the closure of ten posts under Arroyo's successor, Benigno Aquino III, and ultimately to the closure of the consulate in Saipan by October 2012, which returned the Northern Mariana Islands to the jurisdiction of the Guam consulate. The same closure also led to the Philippine Embassy in Koror, Palau closing, which in turn also brought Palau, the Marshall Islands and the Federated States of Micronesia to the consular jurisdiction of the consulate. Jurisdiction over the three countries was later transferred to the Philippine Embassy in Tokyo in 2023, although they are still within the Hagåtña mission's consular jurisdiction and the consulate regularly organizes consular missions there.

== Chancery ==
The Consulate-General's chancery has moved several times throughout its history. It was first located at the Amistad Building from its opening until 1959, when it relocated to the Arriola Building. In 1962, the chancery relocated to the Bohm Building.

On September 1, 1963, the chancery relocated to the Corn Building, developed by Chinese industrialist Charles L. Corn, in the Anigua neighborhood of western Hagåtña. It remained there until 1972, when it relocated to the second floor of the GCIC Building on West Soledad Avenue. The chancery ultimately left Hagåtña for Tamuning in 1978, when it relocated to its current location at the Guam International Trade Center.

The consulate-general was forced to temporarily relocate out of the Guam International Trade Center in 2023 after Typhoon Mawar (Betty) caused significant water damage to the chancery, leading to a temporary chancery opening at the Micronesia Mall on June 16, 2023. Operations at the Guam International Trade Center resumed on July 17, 2023.

== Staff and activities ==
The Philippine Consulate General in Hagåtña is headed by Consul General Rosario P. Lemque, who assumed her position on May 21, 2023. Prior to her appointment as consul general, Lemque, a career diplomat, previously served as the executive director for European affairs at the Department of Foreign Affairs.

With over a quarter of Guam's population being of Filipino descent and a long history of shared relations between Filipinos and native Chamorros, many of the consulate's activities revolve around the growing economic, trade and cultural relations between the Philippines and Guam. It has given support to activities such as promoting Filipino culture among young Filipinos resident in the territory, showcasing art produced by Filipino American artists, and facilitating the visits of Philippine business delegations looking to do business in Guam. It also organizes regular consular visits to areas under its jurisdiction, especially in Saipan.

In 2014, the consulate facilitated the construction of a controversial monument to Apolinario Mabini in Asan, where he was exiled to after refusing to swear allegiance to the United States after the defeat of Filipino forces in the Philippine–American War. Although the monument came at no cost to the local government, local protesters complained that Mabini did not have strong ties to the village, with some even expressing that a monument to local residents fighting the Japanese during World War II, or any Chamorro historical figure, should be built instead. The monument's unveiling was postponed, and was subsequently damaged by a man throwing eggs at it, but in May 2015 the monument was destroyed and finally removed as a result of Typhoon Dolphin. The monument and the subsequent controversy that followed its construction ultimately led to the mayor of Asan-Maina, Joana Margaret Blas, losing reelection the following year.

== See also ==
- List of diplomatic missions of the Philippines
- List of diplomatic missions in the United States
