= Taipei Economic and Cultural Office, Los Angeles =

Political representative office in Los Angeles, California

Taipei Economic and Cultural Office in Los Angeles 駐洛杉磯臺北經濟文化辦事處
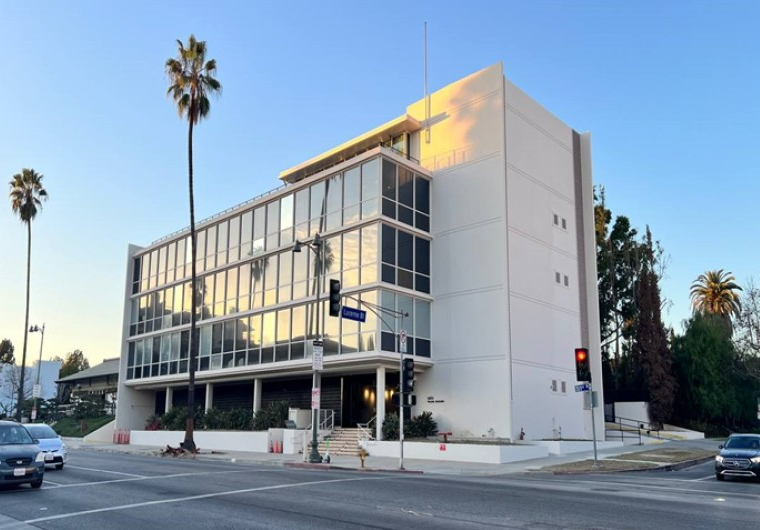

Agency overview
- Formed: 1 March 1979 (as the Los Angeles Office of the Coordination Council for North American Affairs)
- Headquarters: 4401 Wilshire Boulevard, Los Angeles, California
- Agency executive: Jason Ma, Director-General
- Website: Official website

Taipei Economic and Cultural Office in Los Angeles (TECO-Los Angeles, Chinese: 駐洛杉磯臺北經濟文化辦事處; pinyin: Zhù Luòshānjī Táiběi jīngjì wénhuà bànshì chù) represents the interests of Taiwan in the western United States, functioning as a de facto consulate. The mission is located in Wilshire Boulevard in Los Angeles. It also oversees a Cultural Center in El Monte, California. The mission serves Southern California, Arizona and New Mexico.

== Background ==
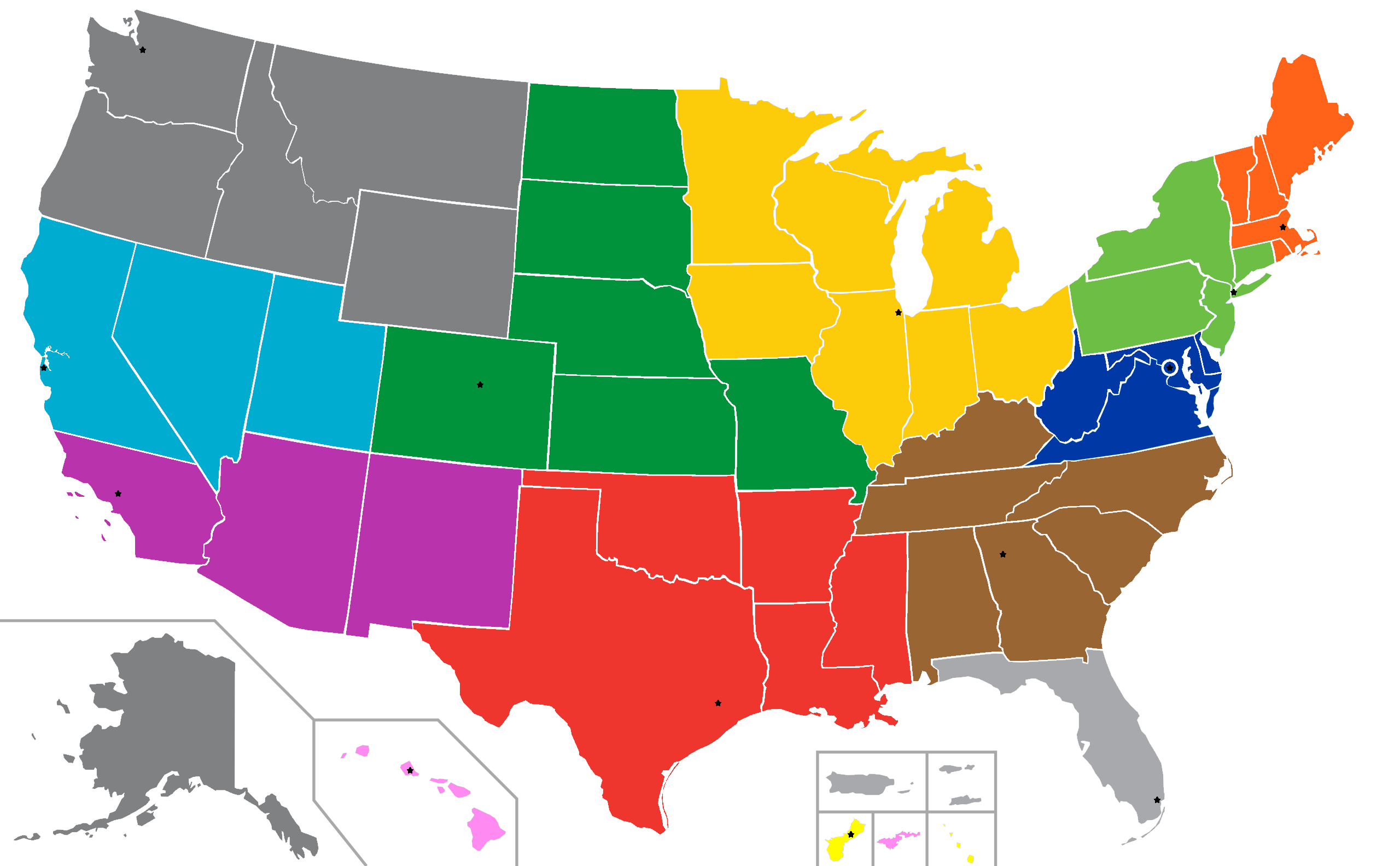
Consular district of TECO Los Angeles

Following the signing of the Joint Communiqué on the Establishment of Diplomatic Relations between the United States and the People's Republic of China which resulted in the United States terminating diplomatic relations with the Republic of China, the Consulate General of the Republic of China in Los Angeles was closed on 28 February 1979. On 1 March 1979, the Coordination Council for North American Affairs of the Ministry of Foreign Affairs of the Republic of China established the Los Angeles Office of the Coordination Council for North American Affairs. On 10 October 1994, it was renamed the Taipei Economic and Cultural Office in Los Angeles.

Prior to 2025, the office was located in Koreatown, Los Angeles, at 3731 Wilshire Boulevard. In January 21, 2025, the office was relocated to 4401 Wilshire Boulevard.

== See also ==
- Taipei Economic and Cultural Representative Office in the United States
- Diplomatic missions of the Republic of China
