= List of diplomatic missions in New Jersey =

This is a list of diplomatic missions in the U.S. state of New Jersey. A number of foreign governments have established diplomatic and trade representation through resident consulates, honorary consulates, and other types of establishments.

For other diplomatic missions in the United States, see List of diplomatic missions in the United States.

== Consulates and Consulates General ==
All resident consulates in New Jersey are located in the northeastern region of the state.

- Colombia, 550 Broad Street, Newark
- Dominican Republic, 140 Market St 6th floor, Paterson
- Ecuador, 400 Market Street, Newark
- El Salvador, 40 Parker Road, Elizabeth
- India, Suite 1080, 2035 Lincoln Hwy, Edison Township
- Mexico, 390 George Street, New Brunswick
- North Macedonia, 100 Challenger Road, Ridgefield Park
- Peru, 100 Hamilton Plaza, Paterson
- Portugal, 1 Riverfront Plaza, Newark

== Honorary consulates ==
- Finland (Newark)
- France (Princeton)
- Republic of Georgia (Jersey City)
- Haiti (Trenton)
- Italy (Clifton)
- Kyrgyzstan (South Plainfield)
- Spain (Newark)
- Sri Lanka (Newark)

== Missions/Representative Offices ==
- Canada Trade Office (Princeton)
