= Taipei Economic and Cultural Representative Office, Washington, D.C. =

Interests representative of Taiwan in the United States

Taipei Economic and Cultural Representative Office in the United States
- 駐美國臺北經濟文化代表處
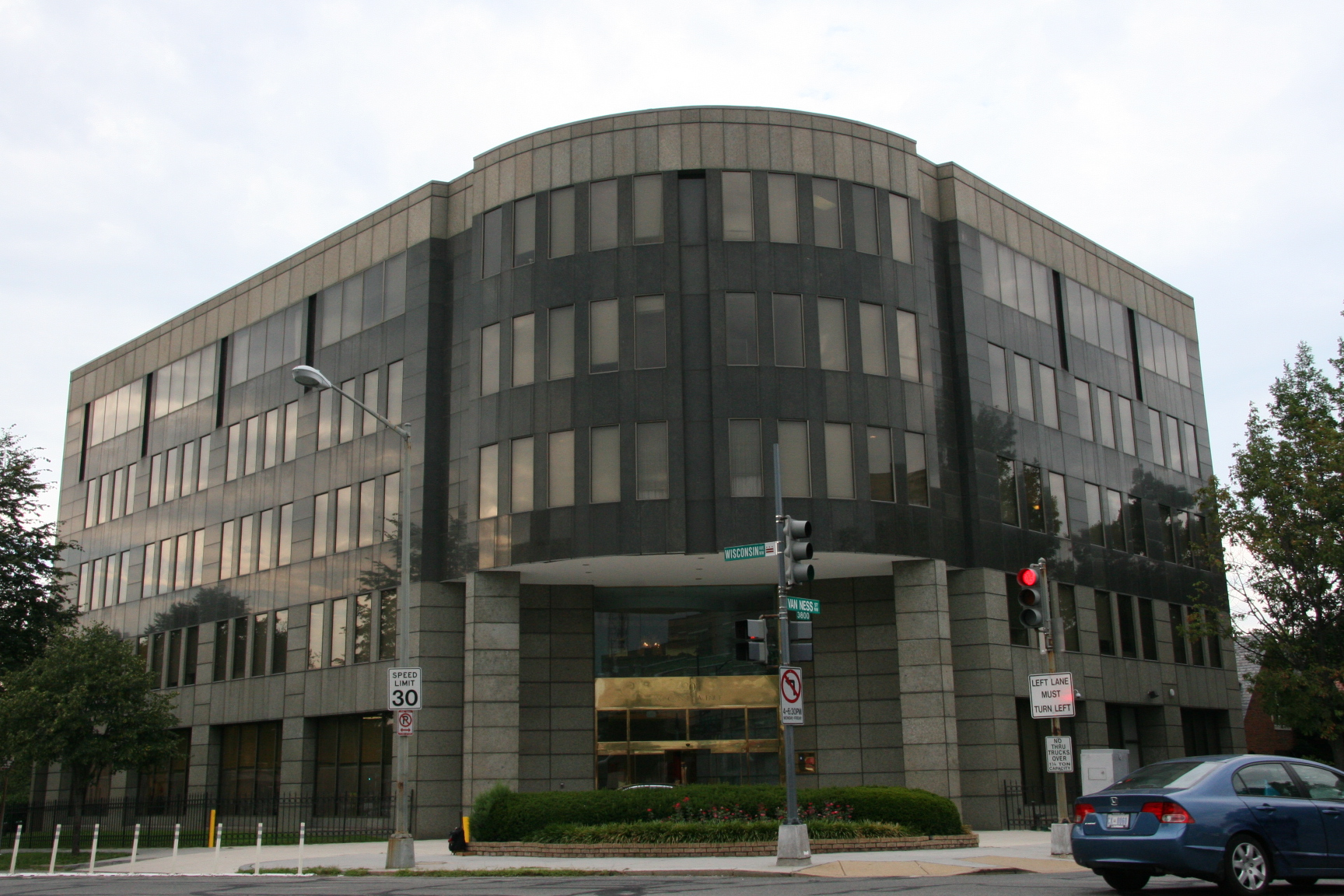
- Representative Office in Washington, D.C.

Agency overview
- Jurisdiction: United States; Cuba; Bahamas; Grenada; Antigua and Barbuda; Trinidad and Tobago; Dominica; Nicaragua
- Headquarters: Washington, D.C., United States
- Agency executive: Alexander Yui, Representative
- Parent agency: Ministry of Foreign Affairs, Republic of China
- Website: Taipei Economic and Cultural Representative Office in the United States

The Taipei Economic and Cultural Representative Office in the United States (Chinese: 駐美國臺北經濟文化代表處) is the representative office of Taiwan in the United States in the absence of formal diplomatic relations, functioning as a de facto embassy. Its counterpart in Taiwan is the American Institute in Taipei.

== History ==
Period	Name	Chinese
Jan 1, 1912 — May 17, 1935	Legation of the Republic of China in the United States of America	中華民國駐美利堅國公使館
May 17, 1935 — Dec 31, 1978	Embassy of the Republic of China in the United States of America	中華民國駐美利堅合眾國大使館
March 1, 1979 — Oct 10, 1994	Coordination Council for North American Affairs, Office in the United States	北美事務協調委員會駐美國辦事處
Oct 10, 1994 — present	Taipei Economic and Cultural Representative Office in the United States	駐美國臺北經濟文化代表處

Prior to 1979, the Republic of China (with government on Taiwan since 1949) was represented in Washington, D.C. by its embassy, occupying the building now used by the Haitian embassy. After the transfer of recognition to the People's Republic of China, the government of the Republic of China was no longer recognized by the United States, and therefore no longer entitled to use the former embassy, with its diplomatic mission replaced by a non-diplomatic-titled representative office. The mission serves as the office of the Coordination Council for North American Affairs (CCNAA) in Washington, D.C., established in March 1979 as the counterpart to the American Institute in Taiwan, after the United States established diplomatic relations with the People's Republic of China. The council was renamed Taiwan Council for U.S. Affairs in 2019.

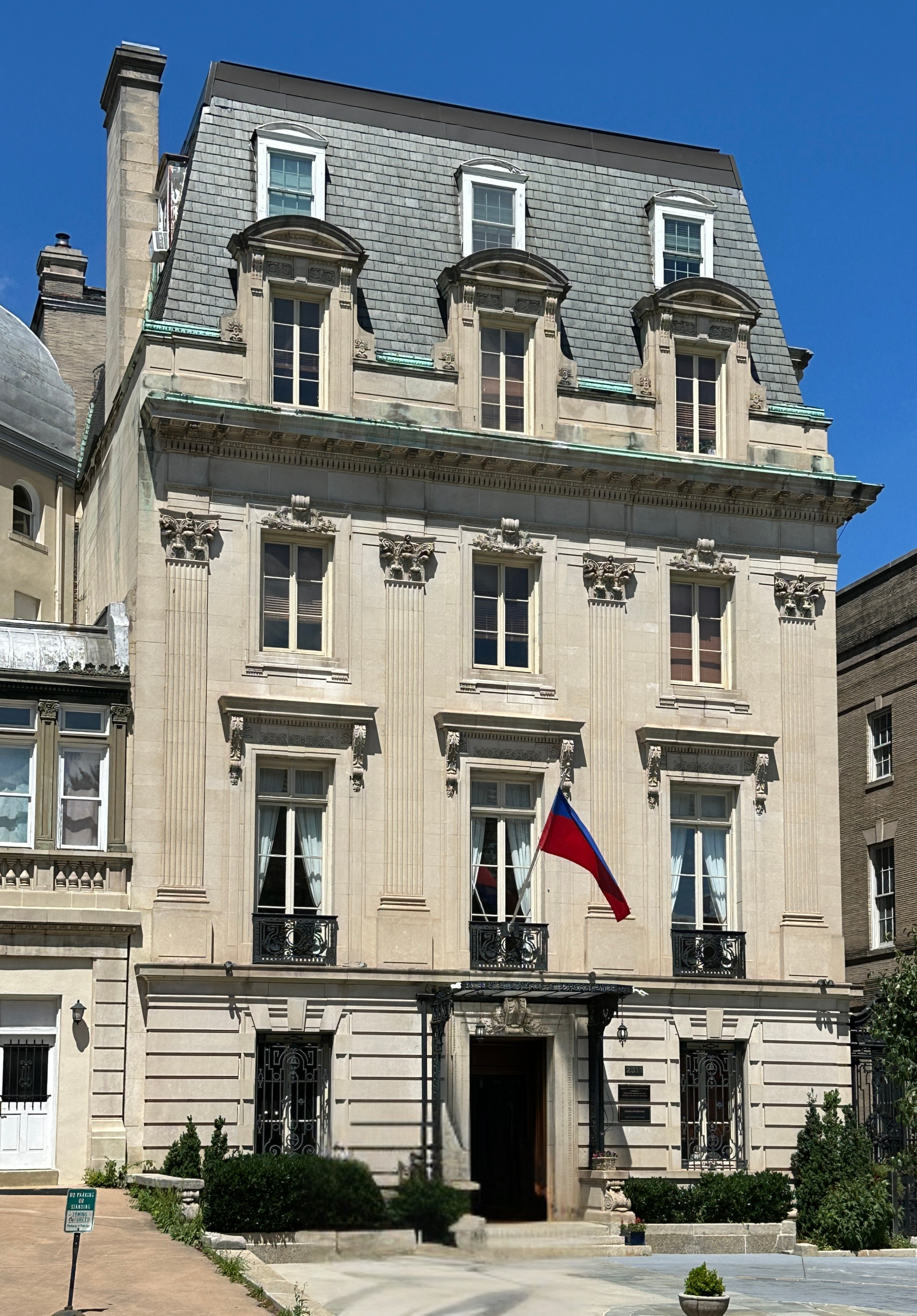
The ROC embassy in the US from 1944 to 1978, on Embassy Row (now the Embassy of Haiti)

In 1994, as a result of the Clinton Administration's Taiwan Policy Review, the name of the CCNAA office in Washington, D.C. (which functioned as an embassy) was changed to Taipei Economic and Cultural Representative Office (TECRO). Similarly, the names of the twelve other CCNAA offices (which functioned as consulates) were changed to Taipei Economic and Cultural Office (TECO).

In September 2020, the US Ambassador to the United Nations Kelly Craft met with Amb. James K.J. Lee, Director-General of the Taipei Economic and Cultural Office in New York, who was secretary-general in Taiwan's Ministry of Foreign Affairs until July, for lunch in New York City in what was the first meeting between a top Taiwan official and a United States ambassador to the United Nations. Craft said she and Lee discussed ways the US can help Taiwan become more engaged within the U.N.

== List of Representatives ==
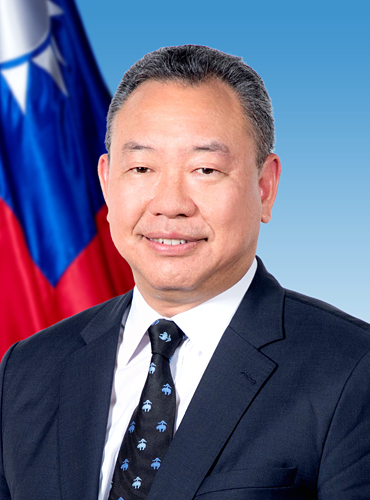
Alexander Yui, ROC representative to the United States.

=== Representatives (CCNAA) ===
- James Shen (1 January 1979 – 9 May 1979)
- Konsin Shah, 1979–81
- Cai Weipin, 1981–82
- Fredrick Chien (19 November 1982 – 20 July 1988)
- Ting Mao-shih, 1988–94

=== Representatives ===
- Benjamin Lu, 1994–96
- Jason Hu, 1996–97
- Stephen S. F. Chen (1997–2000)
- Chen Chien-jen (30 June 2000 – 20 May 2004)
- David Lee (25 July 2004 – 10 April 2007)
- Joseph Wu (10 April 2007 – 26 July 2008)
- Jason Yuan (4 August 2008 – 27 September 2012)
- King Pu-tsung (27 September 2012 – 24 March 2014)
- Shen Lyu-shun (1 April 2014 – 5 June 2016)
- Stanley Kao (5 June 2016 – 24 July 2020)
- Hsiao Bi-khim (24 July 2020 – 30 November 2023)
- Alexander Yui (12 December 2023 – present)

== Consular districts by missions ==
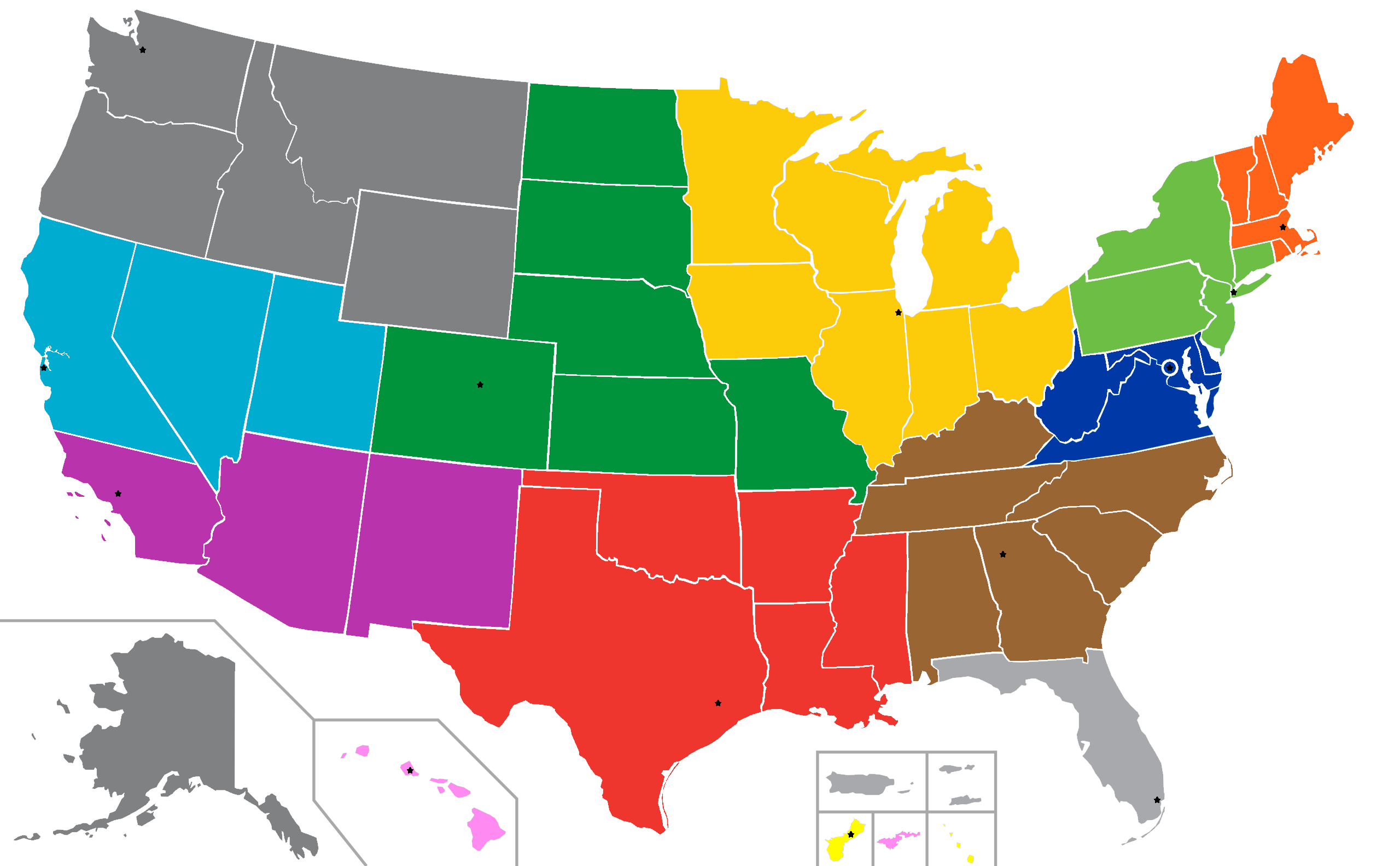

Mission	Consular district
Taipei Economic and Cultural Representative Office in the United States	Washington, D.C., Maryland, Virginia, West Virginia and Delaware
Taipei Economic and Cultural Office in Boston	Massachusetts, Maine, New Hampshire, Rhode Island and Vermont
Taipei Economic and Cultural Office in New York	New York, New Jersey, Pennsylvania and Connecticut
Taipei Economic and Cultural Office in Miami	Florida, Puerto Rico, U.S. Virgin Islands, Bermuda, Bahamas, Turks and Caicos Islands and the Dominican Republic
Taipei Economic and Cultural Office in Atlanta	Georgia, Kentucky, Tennessee, Alabama, North Carolina and South Carolina
Taipei Economic and Cultural Office in Chicago	Illinois, Indiana, Iowa, Michigan, Minnesota, Ohio and Wisconsin
Taipei Economic and Cultural Office in Houston	Texas, Arkansas, Louisiana, Mississippi, and Oklahoma
Taipei Economic and Cultural Office in Denver (relocated from TECO in Kansas City, Missouri since 17 April 2015)	Colorado, Kansas, Missouri, Nebraska, North Dakota and South Dakota
Taipei Economic and Cultural Office in Los Angeles	Southern California, Arizona and New Mexico
Taipei Economic and Cultural Office in San Francisco	Northern California (north of Visalia), Nevada and Utah
Taipei Economic and Cultural Office in Seattle	Washington, Oregon, Idaho, Montana, Wyoming and Alaska
Taipei Economic and Cultural Office in Honolulu	Hawaii, American Samoa and Palmyra Atoll
Taipei Economic and Cultural Office in Guam (merged into consular jurisdiction of Embassy in Palau, from 31 August 2017 to 2020. Restored consular post in Guam since summer 2020.)	Guam and the Commonwealth of Northern Mariana Islands (CNMI)

== Representation in U.S. Congress ==
Including:

- Law firm Alston & Bird with former Senator Bob Dole as registered lobbyist, with a $25,000 monthly retainer; two decades of representation by Dole as of 2016. He died in 2021.
- Richard A. Gephardt, former Congressman, a $25,000-a-month contract; 2016.
- Thomas A. Daschle, former Senator, a $25,000-a-month contract; since 2015.

== See also ==
- List of diplomatic missions of Taiwan
- Diplomatic missions in the United States
- Taipei Economic and Cultural Representative Office
- Twin Oaks Estate
