= Stephen S. F. Chen =

Taiwanese politician

- 陳錫蕃

ROC Representative to the United States
- In office 1997–2000
- Preceded by: Jason Hu
- Succeeded by: Chen Chien-jen

Deputy Secretary-General to the President of the Republic of China
- In office 16 July 1996 – 16 October 1997 Serving with Hwang Jeng-shyong
- President: Lee Teng-hui
- Secretary-General: Huang Kun-huei
- Preceded by: Raymond Tai
- Succeeded by: Hwang Jeng-shyong

Vice Minister of Foreign Affairs of the Republic of China
- In office 1993–1996
- Minister: Fredrick Chien

Personal details
- Born: 11 February 1934 (age 92) Nanjing, Jiangsu, Republic of China
- Party: Kuomintang
- Education: Chiang Kai-shek College; University of Santo Tomas (BA, MA)
- Occupation: Diplomat

Stephen S. F. Chen (Chinese: 陳錫蕃; pinyin: Chén Xīfán) is a Taiwanese former politician and diplomat.

== Early life ==
Chen was born in Nanjing. During the Sino-Japanese War, he and his family followed the national government to Chongqing. At the end of the Second World War, the family moved back to Nanjing. With the coming of the Chinese Civil War, he went to live with the family of his elder sister in Manila, Philippines where he attended Chiang Kai Shek High School now Chiang Kai Shek College.

== Career ==
In 1960, Chen entered the Ministry of Foreign Affairs of the Republic of China. He served in Rio de Janeiro, Brazil; Argentina; and Bolivia. He was consul general in Atlanta from 1973 to 1979, when the United States ceased to recognize the Republic of China. From 1997 to 2000, Chen was director of the Taipei Economic and Cultural Representative Office in Washington, D.C., representing the interests of the Republic of China in the United States as a de facto ambassador.
