= Rapprochement =

French term for re-establishment of friendly relations

In international relations, a rapprochement, which comes from the French word rapprocher ("to bring together"), is a re-establishment of cordial relations between two countries. This may be done due to a mutual antagonist, as the German Empire was seen by both France and the British Empire at the time of their signing of the Entente Cordiale. It has also been done, particularly in the cold war between the Soviet Union and the United States, in an effort to reduce tensions and the likelihood of war.

In the political scene of an individual country, rapprochement means the bringing together of diverse political factions as, for example, during metapolitefsi in Greece.

The word is also used in a personal sense: when friends or family members who are in conflict or have become estranged reestablish a friendlier relationship, they achieve a rapprochement.

== Historical examples ==
=== The Great Rapprochement ===
Relations between the United States and the United Kingdom warmed significantly in the period leading up to World War I. After multiple border and influence disputes in the 19th century, particularly that of the Anglo-American border dispute in Venezuela, interests in the western hemisphere aligned. Public opinion in the United Kingdom supported the United States in the Spanish–American War, though previously they were skeptical of American domination of the Caribbean. Rather than intervene, the British government remained neutral. Likewise, the government of the United States refused to aid the Boers in the Boer War, and instead sold limited amounts of war materials to the United Kingdom. The roots of this rapprochement were both not only strategic, but cultural; many notable political figures including President Theodore Roosevelt supported the United Kingdom on the basis of supporting "Anglo-Saxon" culture.

=== Entente Cordiale ===
The Entente Cordiale was a series of diplomatic agreements between the United Kingdom and France in 1904 that saw the warming of relations and simplification of overseas borders. In particular, the original cause for the negotiations was the disputed north African colonies of both colonial powers. Diplomats agreed to colonial concessions in order to prevent colonial conflict between the two; it would eventually grow to be a military alliance acting as a counterweight to the Triple Alliance that would see conflict in World War I. Rather than a formal agreement to military aid, the Entente Cordiale grew with the various diplomatic crises leading up to World War I. The effects of rapprochement could be seen with Franco-British unity in the Moroccan Crisis against the German Empire.

=== Chinese–American rapprochement ===
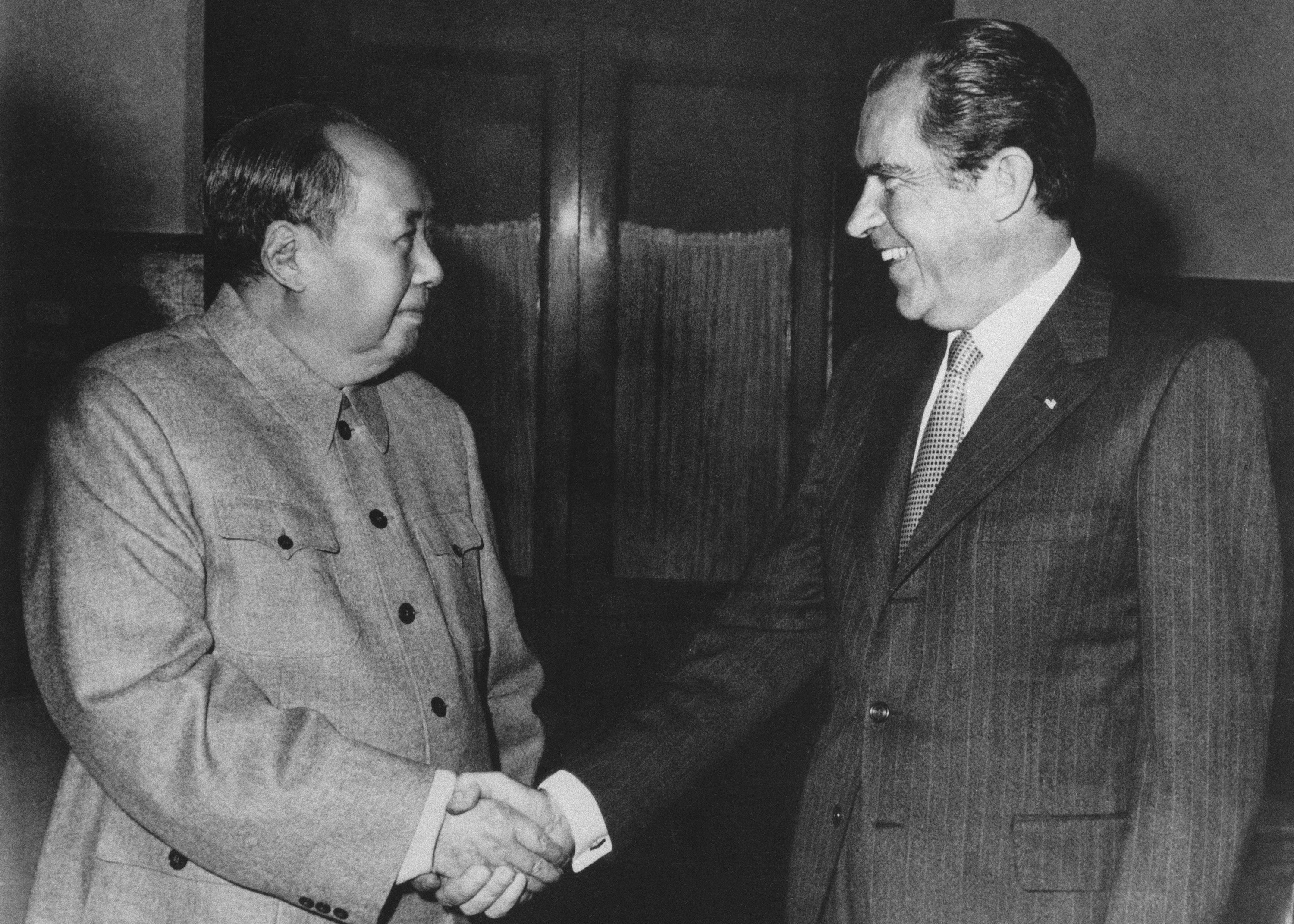
General Secretary Mao Zedong (left) shakes hands with President Richard Nixon (right) during the latter's visit to China in 1972.

The mending of relations between the United States under Richard Nixon and the People's Republic of China from 1972 onward can be considered to be rapprochement. In a 1979 reversal of previous diplomatic policy, the Joint Communiqué on the Establishment of Diplomatic Relations ended the official recognition of the Republic of China and caused the American withdrawal of troops from Taiwan. It was the culmination of a warming of relations, effectively recognizing the People's Republic of China (as opposed to the Republic of China) as the sole government of China and led to a transformation of the bilateral relationship in the modern era.

=== Détente ===
The period known as détente, or "relaxation", between the United States and the Soviet Union during the 1970s was a time of rapprochement. Treaties limiting the scope and number of strategic weapons, including SALT I, were signed. This was partially in response to construction of missile defense systems, which would allow a nation to launch a first strike and shoot down retaliation. As such, agreements were signed to reduce the feasibility of a first strike - while further agreements sought to reduce strategic weapons systems, rather than cap them. This led to more cordial relations overall between the two superpowers.

== Methods and causes ==
Rapprochement often begins with a joint policy, treaty or statement, such as with the SALT I treaty or the Joint Communiqué on the Establishment of Diplomatic Relations. Often, the rapprochement occurs specifically in an attempt to counter another power, like with Chinese-American rapprochement targeted towards the Soviet Union. Likewise, France and the United Kingdom sought to counter the German Empire.

== See also ==
- The Great Rapprochement
- Entente Cordiale
- Joint Communiqué on the Establishment of Diplomatic Relations
- Détente
