= Alexander Yui =

Taiwanese diplomat

- 俞大㵢
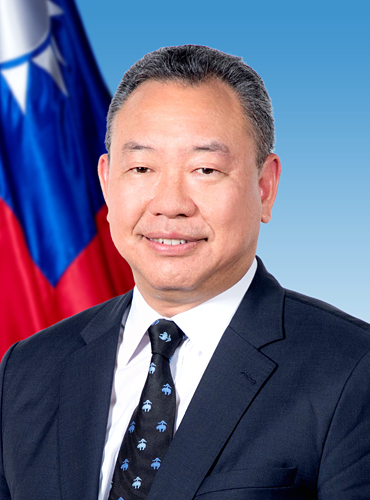

16th Taiwanese Representative to the United States
- Incumbent
- Assumed office 12 December 2023
- President: Tsai Ing-wen; Lai Ching-te
- Preceded by: Hsiao Bi-khim

12th Taiwanese Representative to the European Union and Belgium
- In office September 2023 – 12 December 2023
- President: Tsai Ing-wen
- Preceded by: Remus Chen
- Succeeded by: Roy Lee

Vice Minister of Foreign Affairs
- In office June 2021 – September 2023
- Minister: Joseph Wu
- Preceded by: Miguel Tsao
- Succeeded by: Remus Chen

14th Taiwanese Ambassador to Paraguay
- In office October 2015 – April 2018
- President: Ma Ying-jeou; Tsai Ing-wen
- Preceded by: José María Liu
- Succeeded by: Chou Lin

Personal details
- Education: Texas A&M University (BA, MA)
- Occupation: Diplomat

Alexander Yui Tah-ray (Chinese: 俞大㵢; pinyin: Yú Dàléi) is a Taiwanese diplomat who has served as Taiwan's representative to the United States since December 2023. A career diplomat with more than three decades of service, he previously served as Taiwan's ambassador to Paraguay from 2015 to 2018, director-general of the Department of Latin American and Caribbean Affairs from 2018 to 2021, vice minister of foreign affairs from 2021 to 2023, and representative to the European Union and Belgium in 2023.

== Early life and education ==
Yui was born into a family of diplomats and attended high school in Panama.

He attended Texas A&M University, receiving a bachelor's degree in political science and modern languages in 1986 and a master's degree in Spanish literature in 1988.

Yui later completed the Senior Executive Fellows program at the Harvard Kennedy School in 2002 and executive programs at the Wharton School of the University of Pennsylvania and the London School of Economics in 2010. He was also a diplomacy fellow at the Brookings Institution in 2010.

== Diplomatic career ==
=== Early career ===
Yui began working in the Department of Central and South American Affairs of Taiwan's Ministry of Foreign Affairs (MOFA) in 1989. He returned to the department from 1992 to 1995 after a period away from the ministry.

From 1995 to 1999, he served as an executive assistant at the Taipei Economic and Cultural Office in New York. He subsequently served as a section chief in the Department of Central and South American Affairs from 1999 to 2002, while concurrently serving as an interpreter for Taiwan's president and other senior government officials.

From 2003 to 2009, Yui was posted to Taiwan's embassy in El Salvador, where he served successively as first secretary, senior first secretary and political counselor. From 2009 to 2011, he was a counselor on home assignment in the Department of Central and South American Affairs. During this period, he spent part of 2010 as a diplomacy fellow at the Brookings Institution.

Yui became deputy director-general of the Department of Central and South American Affairs in 2011, serving until 2012.

=== Geneva ===
From 2012 to 2015, Yui served as chief of mission and director-general of the Taipei Cultural and Economic Delegation in Geneva, Switzerland.

=== Ambassador to Paraguay ===
Yui became Taiwan's ambassador to Paraguay in October 2015.

During his tenure, President Tsai Ing-wen visited Paraguay in June 2016 on her first overseas trip after taking office. Yui joined Tsai, Taiwanese Foreign Minister David Lee, National Security Council Secretary-General Joseph Wu, Paraguayan Foreign Minister Eladio Loizaga and other officials at the inauguration of a new Taiwanese embassy building in Asunción.

Yui remained ambassador until April 2018.

=== Ministry of Foreign Affairs ===
After returning to Taiwan, Yui served as director-general of MOFA's Department of Latin American and Caribbean Affairs from 2018 to 2021.

In that position, Yui was responsible for Taiwan's diplomatic and political relations with Latin American and Caribbean countries and represented the ministry in discussions concerning Taiwan's remaining diplomatic allies in the region.

In June 2021, Yui was appointed vice minister of foreign affairs under Foreign Minister Joseph Wu. He served as vice minister until September 2023.

=== Representative to the European Union and Belgium ===
In 2023, Yui was appointed Taiwan's representative to the European Union and Belgium. He took up the position in September 2023.

His tenure in Brussels was brief. In November 2023, the Taiwanese government selected him to become its representative to the United States following the resignation of Hsiao Bi-khim.

=== Representative to the United States ===
Yui assumed office as Taiwan's representative to the United States on 12 December 2023, succeeding Hsiao, who had returned to Taiwan to become Lai Ching-te's running mate in the 2024 Taiwanese presidential election.

In a January 2024 interview with the Associated Press, Yui said the incoming Lai administration intended to maintain the existing cross-strait status quo and was not seeking either formal Taiwanese independence or unification with the People's Republic of China. He also emphasized Taiwan's desire to strengthen its unofficial relationship with the United States while maintaining regional stability.

As representative, Yui has participated in diplomatic, economic and security-related exchanges between Taiwan and the United States. His tenure has included engagement with members of the United States Congress, U.S. government officials, universities and policy organizations.

In February 2026, Yui signed the U.S.–Taiwan Agreement on Reciprocal Trade on behalf of the Taipei Economic and Cultural Representative Office in the United States (TECRO). American Institute in Taiwan Washington Office managing director Ingrid D. Larson signed on behalf of AIT. The signing was witnessed by U.S. and Taiwanese economic officials, including U.S. Trade Representative Jamieson Greer.

==== Workplace allegations ====
In 2026, allegations concerning Yui's management of Taiwan's representative office in Washington and his interactions with staff circulated in Taiwanese media and online. In April, Yui acknowledged criticism of his management style, saying that he regretted causing difficulties for staff and that he would work to improve his management and communication. He disputed other allegations, describing some reports as fabricated, and called for an investigation.

== Personal life ==
Yui is fluent in Spanish and English and is conversational in French. His father was also a diplomat.

== See also ==
- Foreign relations of Taiwan
- Taiwan–United States relations
- Taiwan–Paraguay relations
- Taipei Economic and Cultural Representative Office in the United States

== Early life and education ==
Yui was born to a family of diplomats. He attended high school in Panama. He then went to the United States and enrolled at Texas A&M University, where he earned a bachelor's degree in political science and foreign languages in 1986 and a master's degree in Spanish literature in 1988.

In 2002, Yui was a senior fellow at the Harvard Kennedy School. In 2010, he studied business at the Wharton School of the University of Pennsylvania and at the London School of Economics.

== Diplomatic career ==
Yui served as the Representative of Taiwan to the European Union and Belgium in 2023. He was designated as the Taiwanese representative to the United States in November 2023 after the resignation of Hsiao Bi-khim. He had also served several diplomat offices including the vice minister of the Ministry of Foreign Affairs, Taiwanese ambassador to Paraguay, director of the Taiwanese Representative Office in the Latin America and the Caribbean.

In December 2023, Yui succeeded Hsiao Bi-khim as the Taiwanese representative to the United States.

== Personal life ==
Yui is fluent in Spanish and English, and conversational in French. He speaks English with a Panamanian accent. His father was also a diplomat.
