= Taipei Economic and Cultural Office, Honolulu =

Political representative office in Honolulu, Hawaii

Taipei Economic and Cultural Office in Honolulu 駐檀香山臺北經濟文化辦事處
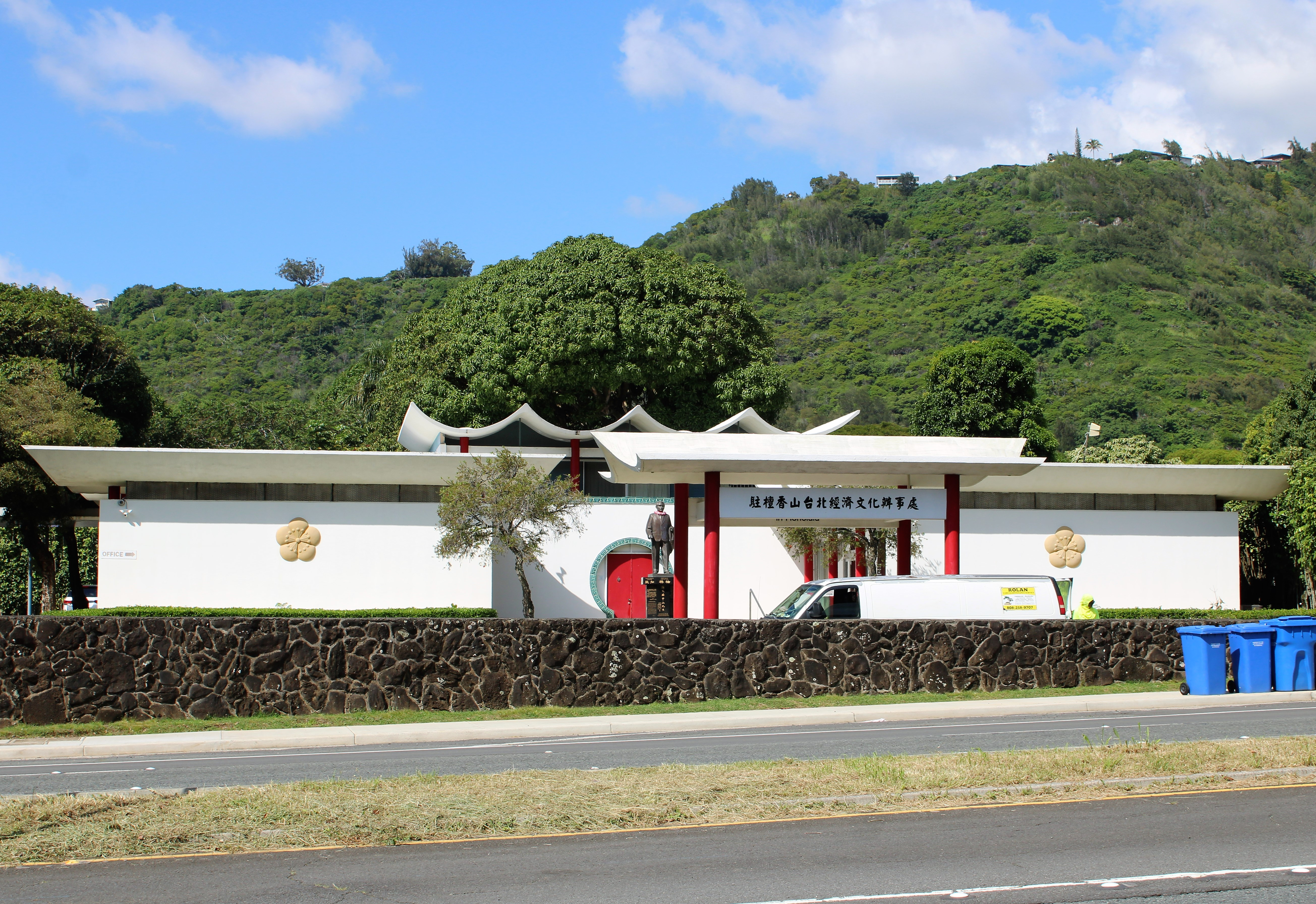

Agency overview
- Formed: 1 March 1979 (as the Honolulu Office of the North American Affairs Coordinating Committee)
- Headquarters: 2746 Pali Highway, Honolulu, Hawaii
- Agency executive: Jerry S. Chang, Director-General
- Website: Official website

Taipei Economic and Cultural Office in Honolulu (TECO-Honolulu, Chinese: 駐檀香山臺北經濟文化辦事處; pinyin: Zhù Tánxiāngshān Táiběi jīngjì wénhuà bànshì chù) represents the interests of Taiwan in the United States Pacific Islands region, functioning as a de facto consulate. The mission is located in Pali Highway in Honolulu. The mission serves Hawaii, American Samoa and Palmyra Atoll.

== Background ==
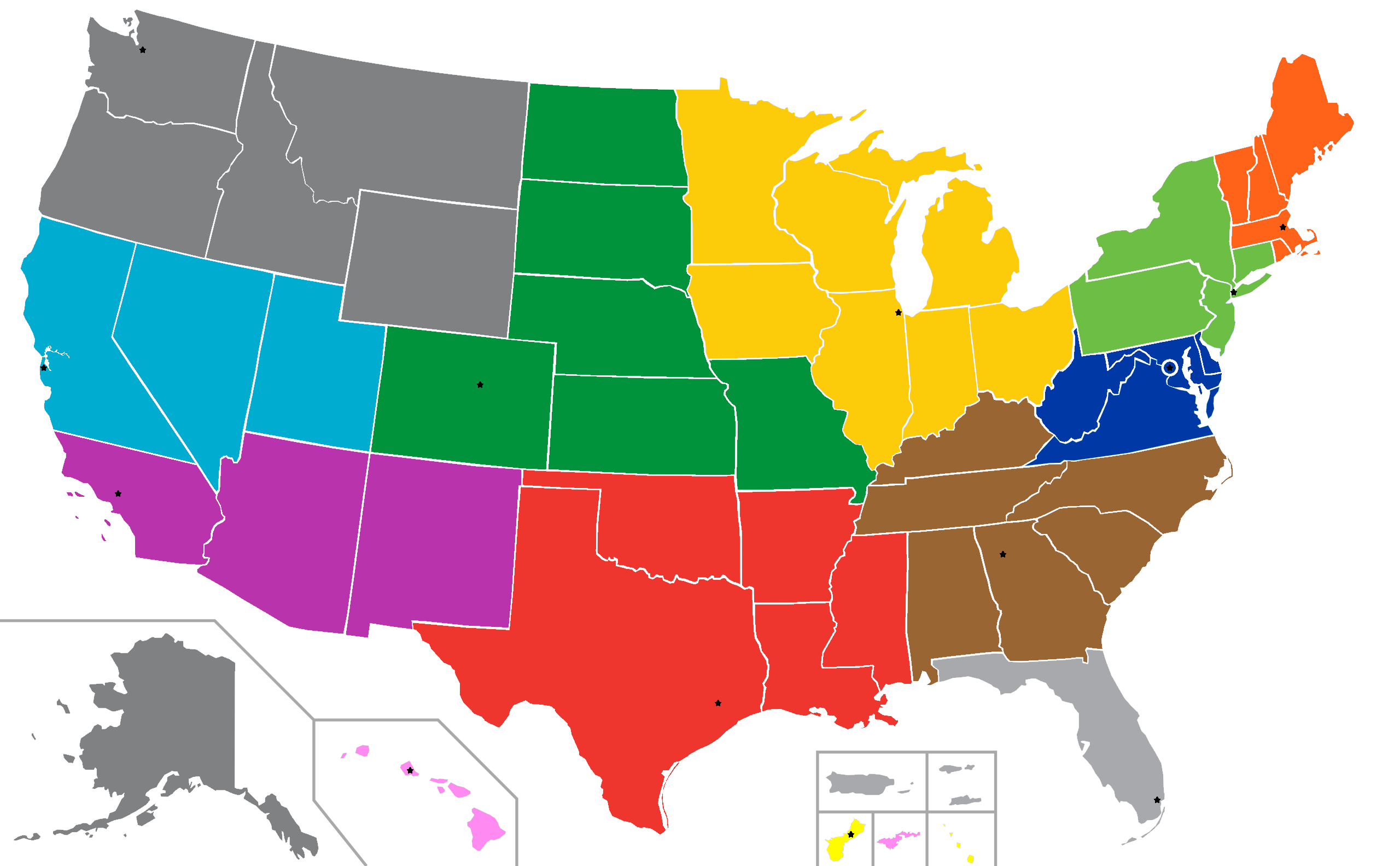
Consular district of TECO Honolulu

Following the signing of the Joint Communiqué on the Establishment of Diplomatic Relations between the United States and the People's Republic of China which resulted in the United States terminating diplomatic relations with the Republic of China, the Consulate General of the Republic of China in Honolulu was closed on 28 February 1979. On 1 March 1979, the Coordination Council for North American Affairs of the Ministry of Foreign Affairs of the Republic of China established the Honolulu Office of the North American Affairs Coordinating Committee and continued to operate from the original location. On 10 October 1994, it was finally renamed the Taipei Economic and Cultural Office in Honolulu.

External videos
- The building of the Republic of China Consulate General in Honolulu in the 1960s.

== See also ==
- Taipei Economic and Cultural Representative Office in the United States
- Diplomatic missions of the Republic of China
