= Consulate General of the Philippines, Honolulu =

Diplomatic mission of the Philippines in Honolulu, United States

Consulate General of the Philippines, Honolulu Konsulado Panlahat ng Pilipinas sa Honolulu Wahi Noho o ke Kanikela o ʻĀina Pilipino ma Honolulu

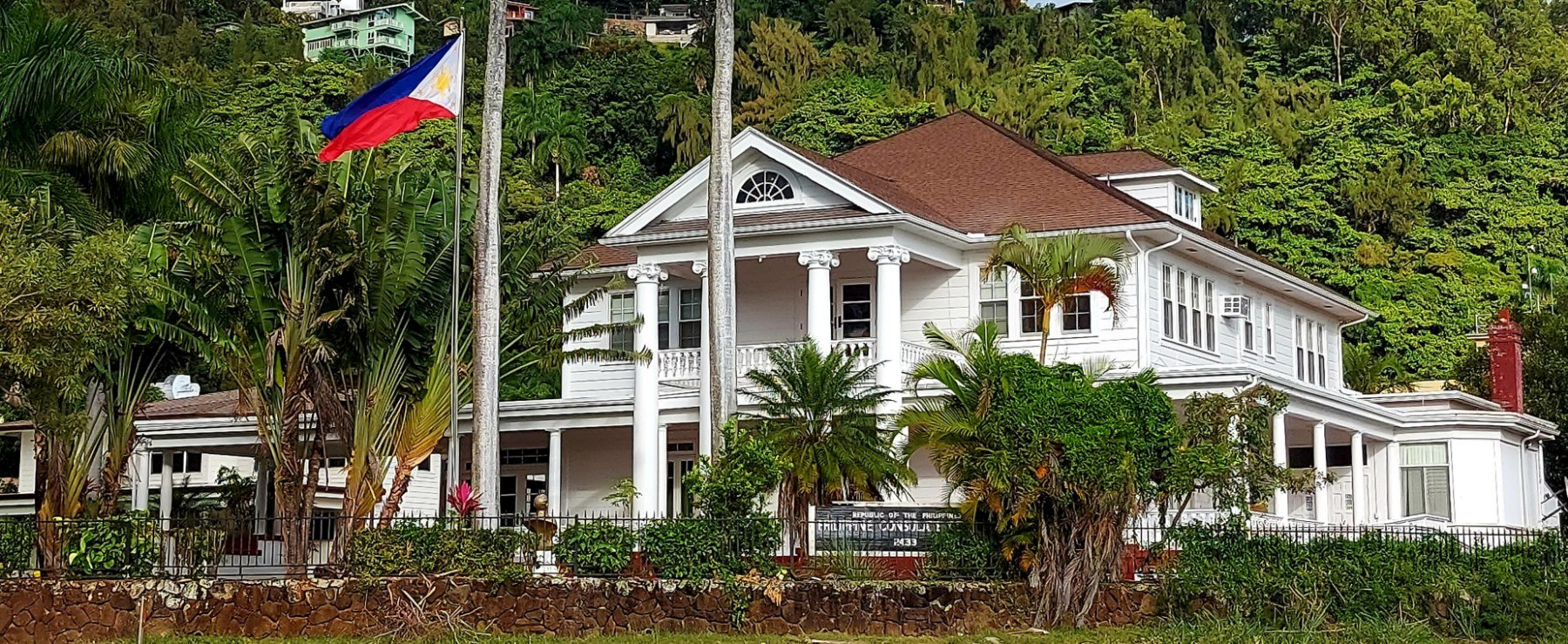
- Location: Honolulu
- Address: 2433 Pali Highway
- Coordinates: 21°19′42.0″N 157°50′42.6″W
- Consul General: Arman R. Talbo
- Website: honolulupcg.dfa.gov.ph

The Consulate General of the Philippines in Honolulu is a diplomatic mission of the Republic of the Philippines in the United States, representing the country's interests in Hawaii. Opened in 1946, it is located along Hawaii Route 61 (the Pali Highway) in the Nuʻuanu neighborhood of northern Honolulu, next to the campus of the Hawaii Baptist Academy.

== History ==
The Philippine Consulate General in Honolulu was opened in 1946, immediately after the Philippines was granted independence by the United States. Although initial plans to open a consulate in Honolulu were abandoned by the government due to a lack of funds, the mission was ultimately opened during the presidency of Manuel Roxas as one of the first three consulates general established by the country's newly established Department of Foreign Affairs.

With an initial budget of ₱117,200 (₱13.6 million in 2021 pesos), the consulate was initially based out of an office along South Kukui Street in downtown Honolulu. Roxas would then appoint Modesto Farolan to serve as the mission's first consul general, with Hawaii, Guam and the Northern Mariana Islands falling under the consulate's jurisdiction. A separate mission on Guam was established in 1952.

In the run-up to the People Power Revolution in 1986, the mission's staff urged President Ferdinand Marcos to resign, joining other Philippine diplomatic missions worldwide in urging for a peaceful transfer of power to his eventual successor, Corazon Aquino. Following his ouster in the revolution and the Marcoses' subsequent exile in Hawaii, officials were likewise instructed to closely follow his movements to prevent his return to the Philippines.

When Marcos died in 1989, the consulate refused to lower the Philippine flag to half staff, despite being pressured to do so by pro-Marcos groups in Hawaii, and showed no visible signs of mourning his death. In 1992, Marcos's supporters urged the consulate to allow his remains to lie in state on its grounds before being repatriated to the Philippines – an idea that consul general Solita Aguirre rejected as the consulate was already hosting dozens of Filipino World War II veterans who had arrived in Honolulu to naturalize as U.S. citizens.

== Building ==
The chancery of the Philippine Consulate General in Honolulu is a two-storey mansion constructed in 1905.

Originally owned by the family of German-born businessman William Pfotenhauer, who was hailed as one of Honolulu's greatest businessmen upon his death in 1913, the house later passed to the possession of another German couple, Kauaʻi sugar barons Albert and Florence Horner, to serve as their summer home, where it quickly became a center for social and cultural events. When the Horners relocated to the mainland United States, the property was leased to the German government to serve as the German consulate in Honolulu, and with the outbreak of World War II the mansion was later leased to a German missionary, who started a religious congregation on the property, to prevent its possible confiscation by the U.S. government under the Trading with the Enemy Act of 1917. After World War II, the property was later disposed by the Horner estate, administered by the Bishop Trust Company, to an Alan James Marshall, though the property continued to remain largely vacant.

On July 4, 1947, the first anniversary of Philippine independence from the United States, Farolan proposed the acquisition of a building for the consulate's chancery, which would be funded by pooling donations. This led to the formation of the Philippine Memorial Foundation (PMF), which purchased the property from Marshall the following year for $80,000 ($1.07 million in 2025 dollars). The PMF was able to raise $45,000, which it used to finance the down payment on the property, with the Philippine government paying $600 a month in rent, which was used to amortize the mortgage. The new chancery was inaugurated on November 14, 1948, with the Farolans throwing a reception to celebrate the occasion, but full operations would not begin until the following Tuesday. Initial reception to the chancery was mixed: in 1951, Foreign Affairs Undersecretary Felino Neri claimed that some community members had complained to him that the chancery was now too far from downtown Honolulu – a charge other community members and the PMF had denied, countering that it was perfectly located and it met all the needs of the community.

Ownership of the chancery passed to the Philippine government in 1957, when it acquired the property at cost ($80,000) from the PMF, though shortly before the acquisition the PMF invested $15,000 to renovate the chancery in preparation for the arrival of Consul General Juan Dionisio, who was responsible for convincing the government to acquire the property. Two years later, the city government of Honolulu later acquired 11,395 square feet (1,058.6 m^{2}) of the estate to facilitate the widening of the Pali Highway, and the PMF, having already served its purpose, dissolved in 1961. The Philippine government signed an agreement with construction company Rider Levett Bucknall in 2017 for another renovation, which was completed in March 2021.

Said to be one of the most beautiful homes in Hawaii, the chancery was built in a semi-colonial style, with imposing white columns surrounding the entrance. The ground floor, today housing the consulate's public-facing offices, originally contained four large rooms: a sun room next to the porte-cochère on the east side, a social and entertainment room in the middle, a drawing room and a dining room, as well as a kitchen and a bathroom. The second floor was originally meant to serve as the consul general's residence, although it was ultimately not used for this purpose. The chancery is set on spacious grounds with large trees for shade, covering a land area of 46,000 square feet (4,300 m^{2}).

== Staff and activities ==
The mission is headed by Consul General Arman R. Talbo, who assumed his position on March 18, 2025. Prior to his appointment as consul general, Talbo, an awarded career diplomat who has been with the Philippine foreign service for over 20 years, served as deputy consul general at the Philippine Consulate General in New York City.

With over 300,000 Filipinos in Hawaii, many of the mission's activities revolve around promoting and strengthening economic, historical and cultural ties between the Philippines and Hawaii. It played a leading role in promoting the story of the Sakadas, which led to the establishment of a state holiday by the Hawaii State Legislature, as well as sponsoring cultural programs such as a roving exhibition of Philippine weaving, and establishing a garden on the chancery grounds that are inspired by José Rizal's work in Dapitan. A Sentro Rizal opened in the chancery on August 26, 2021.

The Consulate General has also spearheaded consular outreach missions throughout Hawaii, as well as in American Samoa.

== See also ==
- List of diplomatic missions of the Philippines
- List of diplomatic missions in the United States
- Filipinos in Hawaii
