= Wang Sheng (general) =

Taiwanese general (1915–2006)

- 王昇
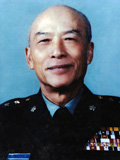

Director of the Political Warfare Bureau, Ministry of National Defense
- In office May 1975 – September 1983

Ambassador of the Republic of China to Paraguay
- In office September 1983 – August 24, 1991

Personal details
- Born: October 28, 1915 Longnan, Jiangxi, Republic of China
- Died: October 5, 2006 (aged 90) Taipei, Taiwan
- Party: Kuomintang (國民黨)
- Children: 5, including Wang Shaudi
- Education: Republic of China Military Academy

Military service
- Allegiance: Republic of China
- Branch/service: Republic of China Army
- Rank: Second-Class General

Wang Sheng (simplified Chinese: 王升; traditional Chinese: 王昇; October 28, 1915 – October 5, 2006) was a general in the Republic of China Army from 1970, head of the General Political Warfare Department (總政治作戰部), and a close confidant of President Chiang Ching-kuo.

As the Director of the General Political Warfare Department, which was responsible for secret military and intelligence operations from 1975 to 1983, Wang was the second most powerful person in Taiwan after President Chiang Ching-kuo as he led the "Liu Shaokang Office" (劉少康辦公室) which was described as the inner court of the Kuomintang party headquarters, and he was rumoured to be the successor to Chiang.

== Mainland life ==
Wang Sheng, born Wang Shiu-chieh on October 28, 1915, was the son of a Hakka land-owning family in Longnan County, Jiangxi, on the Guangdong border. He received an elementary education at Chih-liang Elementary School (1924–29) and then worked as a clerk in his brother's traditional medicine store. After a return to formal study at Nanfang Institute of Chinese Literature, (1932–35), Wang joined the Righteous Warriors Communist Suppression Squad, a militia mopping up after the remaining forces left behind in the former Jiangxi-Fujian Soviet area after the Chinese Communist Party embarked on its Long March.

Wang subsequently joined the 12th Jiangxi Security Protection Regiment, in 1936, as a clerk. After a year, he was transferred to the training battalion of the 6th Strong Youth Training Regiment, which was directly under the leadership of Generalissimo Chiang Kai-shek’s son, Chiang Ching-kuo. CCK, as he later became known, had just returned from a decade in the Soviet Union, during which time he reportedly joined the communist party and then became disillusioned with it. Wang became aide de camp to a regimental commander working directly under CCK, but there is no indication that the two men met at that time.

After a brief period of combat and further self-education, he entered Class 16 of the Jiangxi Third Branch of the Central Military Academy in February 1939. It was at this time that Wang joined the Kuomintang (KMT, or Nationalist Party), and after graduating first in his class, he was sent to the Three Principles of the People (San Min Chu-i or San Min Zhuyi) Youth Corps Training Course, run directly by CCK. Again, Wang graduated at the top of his class, and was chosen to work for Chiang Ching-kuo, which he did for the next 50 years.

After several years in Southern Jiangxi administration, Wang was sent to Chongqing for further training and to attend the San Min Zhuyi Youth Corps’ 1st National Congress, in 1943. At the congress, CCK emerged from his post-Russian shadow and took leading roles in the half-million-strong parallel youth organization. After the congress, Wang was sent back to Jiangxi as the third ranking leader of the provincial Youth Corps. In 1944, he entered the first class of the Central Cadre Academy Research Division, a type of political graduate school; one of his classmates was future Premier Li Huan. However, military setbacks shortened the students’ studies.

Desperate for more soldiers, the party in late 1944 created a youth militia, and made 35-year-old Lieutenant General Chiang Ching-kuo its Political Department Director. Lieutenant Colonel Wang was sent to the South-east Branch as political officer (commissar) of the training base for the 208th and 209th Divisions. (While Wang was at this assignment, a young communist named Jiang Zemin was arrested, and later released by his unit. In 1989, Jiang became General Secretary of the Chinese Communist Party.)

At the end of the War Against Japan, Wang was in charge of the 1st Section (propaganda) of the 31st Corps Political Department, a logical progression when his 208th and 209th Divisions were reorganized into the corps-level unit. From November 1945 to June 1946, Wang was with his units on garrison duty in Hangzhou. He was then reassigned to the seemingly low position of Director of Student Affairs at Chia-hsing (Jiaxing) Youth Middle School, a specially established training and education institution for demobilized soldiers of the Youth Army. He was, however, still directly under the orders of Chiang Ching-kuo.

A year later, in July 1947, CCK tapped (now full) Col. Wang as an inspector in the Ministry of National Defense Bureau of Preparatory Cadres, a revamped Youth Army demobilization organization. Ironically, the transfer coincided with a general mobilization to staff the newly erupting civil war. As needs changed, Wang was tasked as Deputy Section Chief in the KMT Youth Department, his first party assignment. He was nominally based in Nanjing, but travelled to universities across Nationalist-held territory.

=== Hyperinflation ===
In mid-1948, inflation reached such a rate that wheelbarrows full of bank notes were insufficient to keep pace with price changes The government replaced the worthless fabi with a new, gold-backed Chin-yuan Chuan (Jinyuan quan) at a rate of three million to one. Simultaneously, hoarding and speculation were banned. Chiang Ching-kuo was assigned to implement this financial revolution at the Shanghai branch of the Economic Supervisors’ Office, and immediately sent for Col. Wang.

Wang Sheng brought the 6th Suppression and Reconstruction Brigade to Shanghai, and CCK began offering rewards for information on those not complying with the new laws. The unit comprised only 100 junior officers, and was later supplemented by seven other similar units, all under now-Major General Wang's authority. He then established a 30,000-strong Greater Shanghai Youth Service Corps to patrol the streets, enforcing the financial regulations.

CCK and General Wang needed credibility, and fast. They found it by moving against high-profile figures, under the protection of the Chiang family name. Among those arrested were Du Wei-ping, the son of “Big Ears” Du Yuesheng, the senior-most Green Gang triad boss; “Rice Tiger” Wan Moulin, a close associate of Du; and the managers of several industrial establishments owned by former prime minister (and CCK's uncle, step uncle his stepmother Madam Chiang Kai-Shek's brother) T. V. Soong. Ultimately, the effort failed and the regulations were lifted by end-October and hyperinflation returned with a vengeance.

In the chaos of late 1948 and early 1949, Gen. Wang took command of the Jiangxi 3rd Political Work Brigade (his old 6th Suppression and Reconstruction Brigade, renamed) and became Jiangxi Province KMT Secretary. After barely a month in Nanchang, he was ordered to Ganzhou, then Nanjing and Guangzhou. As Guangzhou became untenable, Wang's unit retreated into Chongqing, Sichuan Province; said to have been the last unit to leave Guangzhou for Chongqing.

In November 1949, President Chiang Kai-Shek flew from Taiwan to Chongqing, to personally supervise the defense of Sichuan. That gave Wang an occasion to meet the President. Still, despite Chiang's presence, Chongqing fell to the Communists in the same November, the KMT government retreating to Chengdu. On December 10, the President flew from Chengdu back to Taiwan. Wang hoped to stay in Sichuan and to lead guerilla fighting; but on Chiang's orders, he also left Chengdu, arriving to Taiwan by the way of Hainan. His subordinates stayed behind in Sichuan; many of them made it to Taiwan much later, via Burma.

== Taiwan ==
The Taiwan Wang arrived at in 1950 was the new home for over one million refugees, including many of the very elite of Republican society, government and business. After arriving in Taiwan in 1949, CCK established a Political Action Committee in Kaohsiung with General P’eng Meng-ch’i (Peng Mengqi) and Air Force Commander (later Army Chief-of-Staff) Chou Chih-jou (Zhou Zhirou). Much of the responsibility for the committee's work, however, was delegated to Wang Sheng, intelligence chief Mao Jen-feng (Mao Renfeng) and others (the PAC was renamed the Political Work Department in 1950, and the General Political Warfare Department in 1963). This would have put Wang at the center of the mass purges that resulted in up to 10,000 arrests and as many as a thousand executions during 1949–50.

Gen. Peng deserves special mention. Known as the Butcher of Kaohsiung, Peng oversaw the reestablishment of control over the city, through the use of military force, after reinforcements arrived from the mainland. The association with CCK and General Peng would have had a very important influence on Wang's public reputation.

In the following year or so, numerous high-ranking officials were accused of being communists, and executed. Among these were an Army deputy chief of staff and his wife; the head of conscription; a vice minister of national defense; and the commander of the 70th Division.

In Taiwan, Wang established the precursor to the General Political Warfare College, the elite training school for army and party cadres. Nominally second in charge in the civil-military programs, welfare and services section of CCK's cadre system, Wang's main task was laying the foundation for the Chinese Youth Anti-Communist League, or China Youth Corps as it was renamed. His mentor, Chiang Ching-kuo, was in 1952 named to the reformed KMT politburo and proceeded to take on a series of both military and economic responsibilities directly related to the future of Taiwan. Wang himself was nominated for the Central Committee in 1957, but gave up his seat to a more senior military officer, and as first alternate, joined the CC in May 1959.

Col. Wang spent most of the later 1950s and 1960s training army political cadres in the General Political Warfare College, a position that allowed him to develop a teacher relationship with rising officers throughout the armed forces. All units from company level up were to have a political officer, and those above company level were trained at Wang's Fu Hsing Kang (Restoration Hill Base) College in Taipei. In 1953, he was named Assistant Commandant (i.e., Provost) and in January 1954 was restored to the rank of Major General. By the end of 1955, Wang was Commandant, and 40 years of age.

In 1960, Maj. Gen. Wang was transferred to the post of Deputy Director of the General Political Warfare Department (GPWD), and about a year later in mid-1961 was promoted to Lieutenant General and Executive Deputy Director. He remained in the post, until being promoted to Director in April 1975, the same month in which Chiang Kai-shek died.

General Wang served as director of the General Political Warfare Department of the ROC Armed Forces from 1975 to 1983.

=== Domestic enemies ===
Opposition to the ruling KMT turned violent in the 1970s. Bombings in Tainan and Taipei targeted the American presence on the island in 1970 and 1971, although casualties were light. Explosives also knocked out electric power in the southern part of the island in early 1976. The campaign then escalated toward assassination when letter bombs were sent to Governor (later Vice President) Hsieh Tung-min (Xie Dongmin), former Governor Huang Chieh (Huang Jie) and KMT Organization Department Director Li Huan, who later became KMT Secretary-General and Premier. Governor Hsieh lost his right arm and an eye in the attacks, whereas the others escaped injury. in 1980, bombs at the Los Angeles homes of General Wang's second son, Wang Pu-tien (Wang Butian) and the son of Kaohsiung Mayor Wang Yu-yueng (Wang Yuyong; no relation) detonated, killing Mayor Wang's brother-in-law.

In the spring of 1977, KMT rising star Hsu Hsin-liang (Xu Xinliang) published a mildly critical memoir of his years in the provincial National Assembly, to raise support for his campaign for the seat of Taoyuan County Magistrate. When the KMT failed to nominate him, he ran as an independent, and was expelled from the party. In the run-up to the election, Gen. Wang (and others) undertook a campaign criticizing local literati as leftist. Hsu won election but was later imprisoned for "sedition", and eventually joined the Democratic Progressive Party.

Election irregularities in Chungli County that year led to violence, creating the pretext for a crack-down on dissent and, simultaneously, solidifying the foundations of the opposition political network known as the Tangwai, or “those outside the (Nationalist) party.” One year later, amid a very tight domestic political environment, the United States switched its formal diplomatic recognition from Taipei to Beijing.

== Diplomatic exile ==
Toward the end of his tenure, as President Chiang Ching-kuo's health was failing, General Wang travelled to the US. The trip, to discuss succession plans and possibly win backing for his own candidacy, has been described as either "secretive" or unauthorized. It also marked the end of Wang's special role in Taiwan politics. That CCK was getting potential successors out of the way was confirmed by his posting his own son, Chiang Hsiao-wu, to Taiwan's representative office in Singapore.

For Wang Sheng, an even more remote assignment was found. In November 1983, he arrived to Paraguay as the ambassador of the Republic of China. He was credited with helping the small Chinese-Paraguayan community to better organize, and to become less victimized by police extortion. He, and the staff of his embassy, were instrumental in overseeing Taiwan's development assistance to this Latin American nation, which, although small in absolute terms, later became the world's largest country with which Republic of China has official diplomatic relations. At a reception held by Paraguay's President Andrés Rodríguez before Wang Sheng's departure from Paraguay in 1991, President Rodríguez characterized Wang's contribution to Paraguay as "immeasurable".

Wang Sheng returned to Taiwan only in 1990 or 1991, after Chiang Ching-kuo's death. He died on October 5, 2006, in Taiwan.

== Family ==
Wang divorced his childhood wife (with whom he had a daughter) and married Hu Hsiang-li in 1945, who bore three sons and two daughters. Hu died in 1955. Later, Wang Sheng married Hsiung Hui-ying in November 1956, and had a son.
