= Taipei Economic and Cultural Office, Boston =

Political representative office in Boston, Massachusetts

Taipei Economic and Cultural Office in Boston 駐波士頓臺北經濟文化辦事處
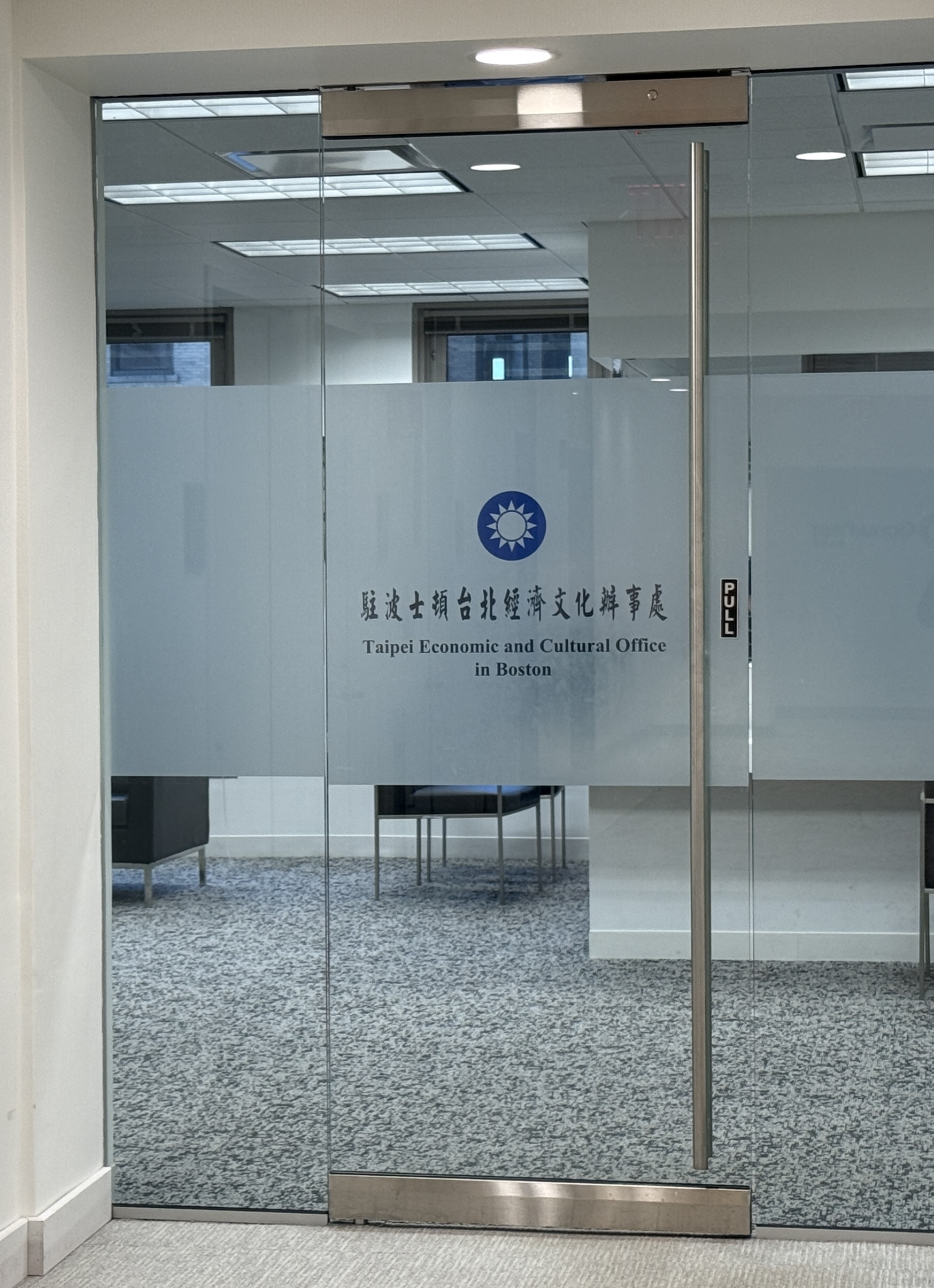

Agency overview
- Formed: October 1982 (as the Boston Office of the Coordination Council for North American Affairs)
- Headquarters: 99 Summer Street, Boston, Massachusetts
- Agency executive: Charles Liao, Director-General
- Website: Official website

Taipei Economic and Cultural Office in Boston (Traditional Chinese: 駐波士頓臺北經濟文化辦事處) is the consulate general-level office of Taipei Economic and Cultural Representative Office in the United States, which functions as the de facto consulate of the Republic of China (Taiwan) in Boston, Massachusetts.

== History ==
Taipei Economic and Cultural Office in Boston was established on October 23, 1982(also noted as November 10, 1982). On October 10, 1994, it was renamed the Coordination Council for North American Affairs in Boston. Its consular district covers Maine, New Hampshire, Massachusetts, Vermont, and Rhode Island.

== See also ==
- Taipei Economic and Cultural Representative Office in the United States
- Diplomatic missions of the Republic of China
