= Taipei Economic and Cultural Office, Miami =

Political representative office in Florida

Taipei Economic and Cultural Office in Miami 駐邁阿密臺北經濟文化辦事處
Agency overview
- Formed: 1988 (as the Miami Office of the North American Affairs Coordinating Council)
- Headquarters: 2333 Ponce De Leon Boulevard, Coral Gables, Florida, United States
- Agency executive: Chou Chi-Yu, Director-General
- Website: Official website

Taipei Economic and Cultural Office in Miami (TECO-Miami, Chinese: 駐邁阿密臺北經濟文化辦事處; pinyin: Zhù Màiāmì Táiběi jīngjì wénhuà bànshì chǔ) represents the interests of Taiwan in Florida, functioning as a de facto consulate. The mission is located at the city of Coral Gables in Miami-Dade County. The mission serves Florida, Puerto Rico and U.S. Virgin Islands, and has consular jurisdiction over Bahamas, Bermuda, Dominican Republic and the Turks and Caicos Islands.

== Background ==
On 21 July 1988, the Representative Office of the Republic of China in the United States announced the establishment of the Miami Office of the North American Affairs Coordinating Council and on 27 August 1988, it was formally established. On 15 March 1989, it was formally opened to the public and on 10 October 1994, the office's name was changed to Taipei Economic and Cultural Office in Miami.

Since February 2023, the office is headed by a director-general, currently Chou Chi-Yu, who previously served as the section chief of the Department of Asia, West Asia and Africa of the Ministry of Foreign Affairs of the Republic of China.

== See also ==
- Taipei Economic and Cultural Representative Office in the United States
- Diplomatic missions of the Republic of China
