= List of ambassadors of the Republic of China to Paraguay =

Coordinates: 25.284661°S 57.615415°W

Taiwanese Ambassador to Paraguay
- Incumbent; Alexander Tah-ray Yui since 16 October 2015
- Inaugural holder: Li Ti-tsun
- Formation: 1 November 1957; 68 years ago

The Taiwanese Ambassador to Paraguay is the official representative of the Republic of China to the Republic of Paraguay.

== List of representatives ==
| Diplomatic agrément/Diplomatic accreditation | Ambassador | Chinese language zh:中華民國駐巴拉圭大使列表 | Observations | List of premiers of the Republic of China | President of Paraguay | Term end |
|---|---|---|---|---|---|---|
| July 8, 1957 | | | The governments in Asunción and Taipei established diplomatic relations. | Yu Hung-Chun | Alfredo Stroessner | |
| November 1, 1957 | Li Ti-tsun | 李迪俊 | As Chinese Ambassador to Brazil coacredited in Asunción. | Yu Hung-Chun | Alfredo Stroessner | April 20, 1963 |
| April 20, 1963 | Yang Yun-chu | zh:杨云竹 | | Chen Cheng | Alfredo Stroessner | April 3, 1967 |
| June 14, 1967 | Samuel S. Wang | 王森 | | Yen Chia-kan | Alfredo Stroessner | September 1, 1970 |
| September 1, 1970 | Hu Shih-hsun | zh:胡世勳 | Hoo, Raymond S. H. | Yen Chia-kan | Alfredo Stroessner | March 27, 1974 |
| March 27, 1974 | Hu Hsin | zh:胡炘 | | Chiang Ching-kuo | Alfredo Stroessner | January 1, 1978 |
| September 1, 1983 | Wang Sheng (general) | zh:王昇 | | Sun Yun-suan | Alfredo Stroessner | August 1, 1991 |
| September 24, 1991 | Kuo Chung-ching | zh:郭宗清 | | Hau Pei-tsun | Andrés Rodríguez | January 1, 1993 |
| December 1, 1993 | Agustín Tin-tsu Liu | 劉廷祖 | | Lien Chan | Juan Carlos Wasmosy | March 1, 2001 |
| March 1, 2001 | Yen Bing-fan | 顏秉璠 | | Tang Fei | Luis Ángel González Macchi | February 1, 2005 |
| February 1, 2005 | David C. Y. Hu | 胡正堯 | | Hsieh Chang-ting | Nicanor Duarte Frutos | September 1, 2009 |
| September 1, 2009 | Huang Lien-sheng | 黃聯昇 | | Wu Den-yih | Fernando Lugo | |
| December 8, 2011 | José María Liu | 劉德立 | | Wu Den-yih | Fernando Lugo | October 16, 2015 |
| October 16, 2015 | Alexander Tah-ray Yui | 俞大㵢 | | Mao Chi-kuo | Horacio Cartes | |

== See also ==
- Paraguay–Taiwan relations
