= Joint Communiqué on the Establishment of Diplomatic Relations =

1979 agreement between the United States and China

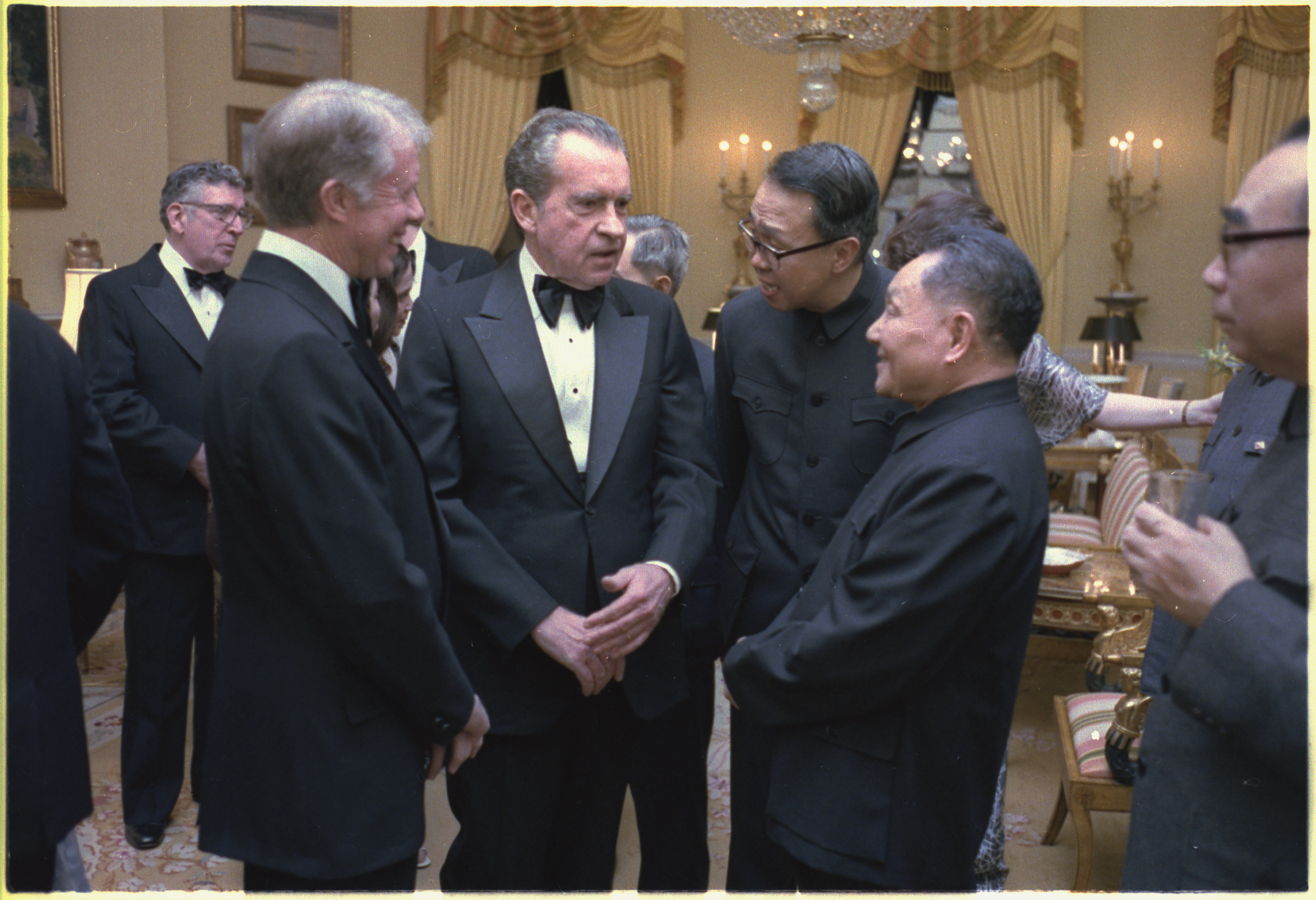
- Jimmy Carter, Richard Nixon and Deng Xiaoping during the state dinner for the Vice Premier of China (1979)
- Presented: December 15, 1978 (Announced)
- Date effective: January 1, 1979
- Location: Washington, D.C. and Beijing
- Signatories: Jimmy Carter (as President of the United States); Hua Guofeng (as Premier of the People's Republic of China)
- Purpose: To formally establish bilateral diplomatic relations, exchange ambassadors, recognize the PRC as the sole legal government of China, and outline the framework for unofficial U.S. relations with Taiwan.

The Joint Communiqué on the Establishment of Diplomatic Relations on January 1, 1979 was announced on December 15, 1978 (16th in China), which established official relations between the United States and the People's Republic of China (commonly called "China").

Its announcement coincided with the ending of U.S. official recognition of the Republic of China (now commonly known as "Taiwan"), which was announced by President Jimmy Carter in December 1978. Carter also announced the withdrawal of all U.S. military personnel from Taiwan and the end of the Sino-American Mutual Defense Treaty signed with the ROC. However, the Taiwan Relations Act passed by the unequivocal support of US Congress (and signed by the Carter Administration) shortly thereafter continued to provide the legal framework as a US domestic law to maintain commercial, cultural, and other relations without official Government representation and without diplomatic relations of the unofficial relations in the form of the American Institute in Taiwan.

Beyond formal recognition, the communiqué reaffirms the principles agreed upon in the Shanghai Communiqué, released almost seven years earlier.

== Summary points ==
The American Institute of Taiwan had outlined 9 core summary points in the 1979 agreement between the United States and China.

1. The US recognized that the Government of the People's Republic of China as "the sole legal Government of China", and it acknowledged the Chinese position that "there is but one China and Taiwan is part of China". Additionally the US would continue to maintain cultural, commercial and unofficial relations with Taiwan, and that the relationship between China and US were normalized.

2. That the "question of United States arms sales to Taiwan" was not settled during negotiations between the two countries.

3. That both sides will have "respect for each other's sovereignty and territorial integrity" and to not interfere in each other's "internal affairs".

4. The Chinese Government emphasizes that "the question of Taiwan is China's internal affair".

5. The US Government states that it "attaches great importance to its relation with China", and reaffirmed that it has "no intention of infringing on Chinese sovereignty and territorial integrity", or on interfering in the internal affairs of China, nor will it be pursuing a policy of "two Chinas" or "one China, one Taiwan."

6. In taking in awareness of each other's statement on the issue of arming Taiwan, the United States Government states that it doesn't "seek to carry out a long-term policy of arms sales to Taiwan", and instead "intends gradually to reduce its sale of arms to Taiwan" over a period of time "leading to a final solution".

7. To achieve bringing about a "final settlement" on "the question of United States arms sales to Taiwan", both countries will strive to make "every effort" to engage in measures and generate conditions that are "conducive to the thorough settlement" of the issue.

8. That the development of United States – China relations would not only be in the interests of both countries but also "conducive to peace and stability in the world".

9. In order to achieve a healthy progression of United States-China relations and maintain global peace, the two governments "reaffirm the principles" that was agreed on by both sides in the "Shanghai Communique and the Joint Communique on the Establishment of Diplomatic Relations", and that the two sides will stay in contact and engage in "appropriate consultations on bilateral and international issues of common interest".

== Differences in wording regarding sovereignty over Taiwan ==
The United States of America recognizes the Government of the People's Republic of China as the sole legal Government of China. ... The Government of the United States of America acknowledges the Chinese position that there is but one China and Taiwan is part of China.

— s:Joint Communiqué on the Establishment of Diplomatic Relations

美利坚合众国政府承认中国的立场，即只有一个中国，台湾是中国的一部分。

— zh:s:中华人民共和国和美利坚合众国关于建立外交关系的联合公报

In the Joint Communiqué, for the position that "there is but one China and Taiwan is part of China (只有一个中国，台湾是中国的一部分)", the verb in the English text of the United States is "acknowledges", and qualified that as "Chinese position", while the verb in the Chinese text of the China is "承认" implying agreement. Compared with the wording of the previous point, there are obvious differences.

According to the source, during the final proofreading stage on the eve of the communiqué, Zhang Wenjin, then Vice Minister of Foreign Affairs of the People's Republic of China, discovered the differences in the US government's wording between views of Taiwan and views of the recognition of the Chinese government, so he resolutely the Chinese word of views on Taiwan is set to "承认" to make it equivalent to the English word "recognizes", in line with the interests of the Chinese government; U.S. diplomat Harvey Julien Feldman pointed out in an interview in 1999 that James Stapleton Roy, the deputy director of the U.S. Liaison Office in Beijing who participated in the negotiations at the time, was also aware of this translation change, but Feldman believed that Roy was trying to normalize Sino-U.S. relations as soon as possible, so remained silent about it. Thereafter, both governments announced this Communiqué simultaneously.

Since then, successive U.S. governments have insisted that they only just know (which means they did not agree yet) that "there is but one China and Taiwan is part of China", they have also stated this attitude on many occasions, and they believe that only the English text is binding on the U.S. government. On the other hand, the Chinese government insists that the Chinese text is also binding on the U.S. government, and therefore requires the U.S. government to accept and agree with the view that "there is but one China and Taiwan is part of China".

== See also ==
- One-China policy
- Three Communiques
- Sino-American relations
- Goldwater v. Carter
