= Taiwan Council for U.S. Affairs =

Taiwan government agency

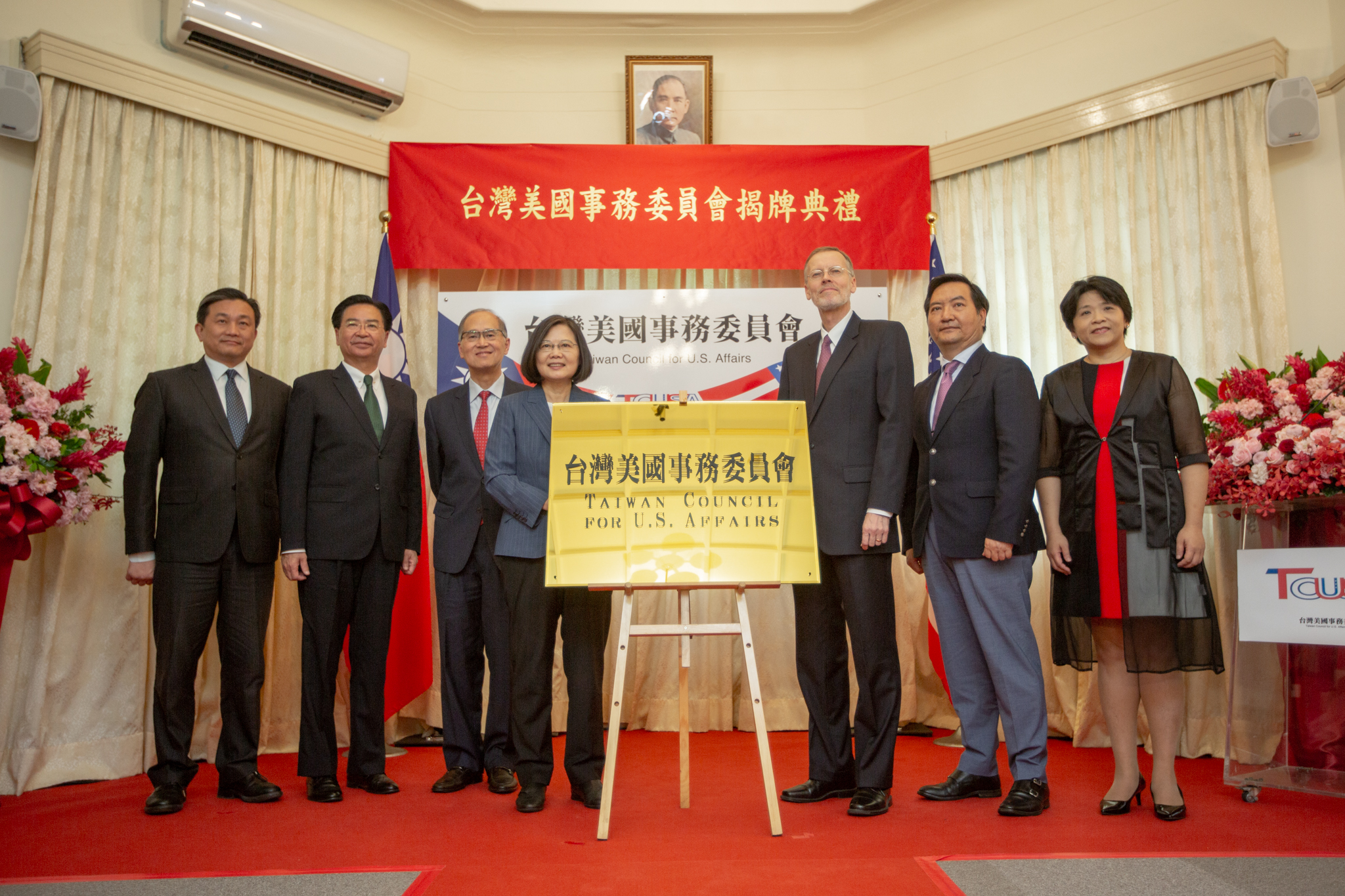
Taiwan Council for U.S. Affairs

The Taiwan Council for U.S. Affairs (Chinese: 臺灣美國事務委員會) is a government agency of Taiwan dedicated to handling matters related to the United States.

== History ==
Originally named the Coordination Council for North American Affairs (CCNAA), it was established on March 1, 1979. Following the termination of diplomatic relations between the Republic of China (Taiwan) and the United States on January 1, 1979, the U.S. established the American Institute in Taiwan in accordance with the Taiwan Relations Act. In response, the Executive Yuan set up the Coordination Council for North American Affairs as its counterpart organization. On May 25, 2019, on the occasion of the 40th anniversary of the Taiwan Relations Act, the council was renamed the Taiwan Council for U.S. Affairs. The official unveiling ceremony took place on June 6 of the same year.

The council is under the jurisdiction of the Executive Yuan and operates under the supervision of the Ministry of Foreign Affairs.
