= Trump–Tsai phone call =

2 December 2016 phone call

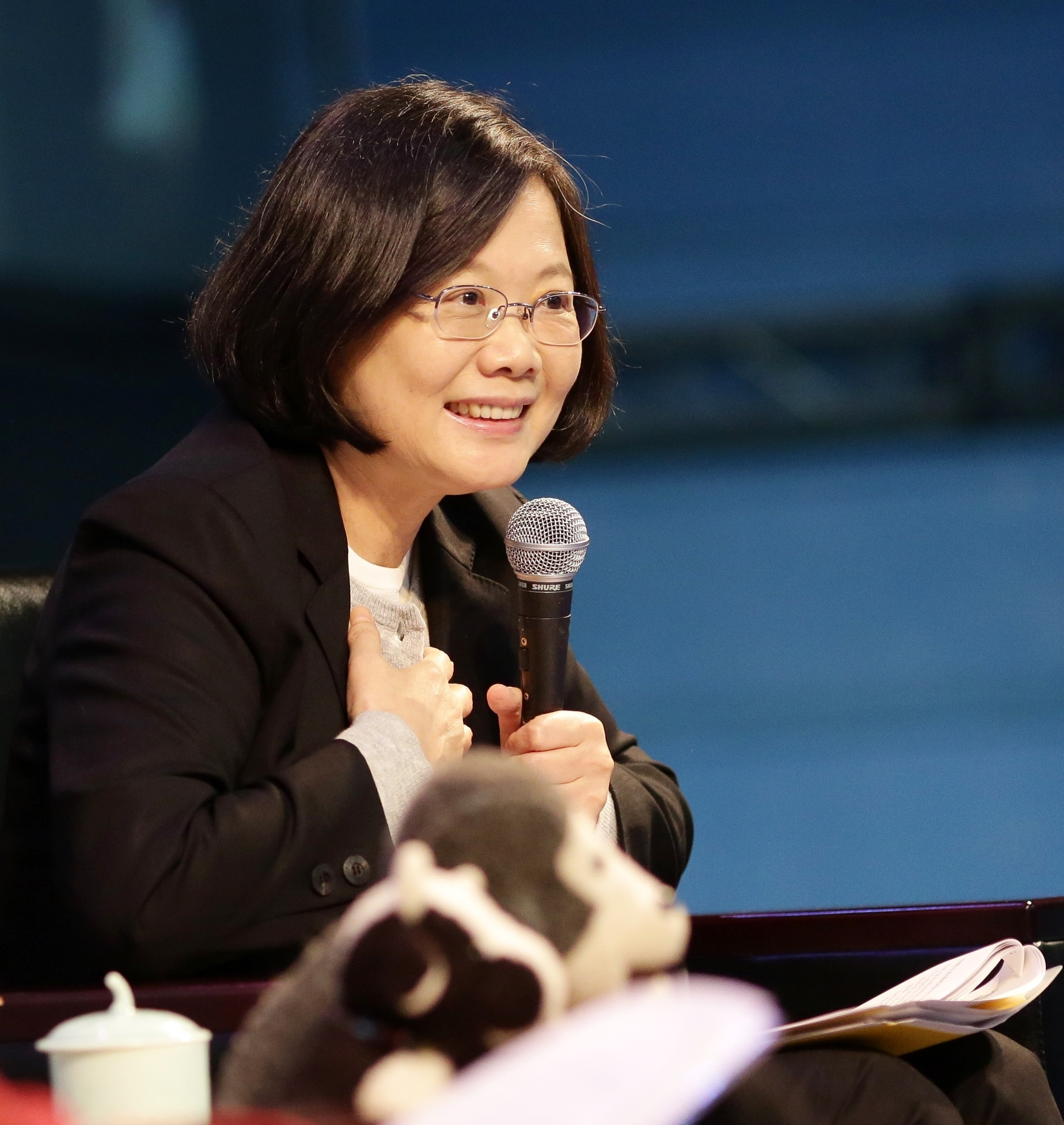
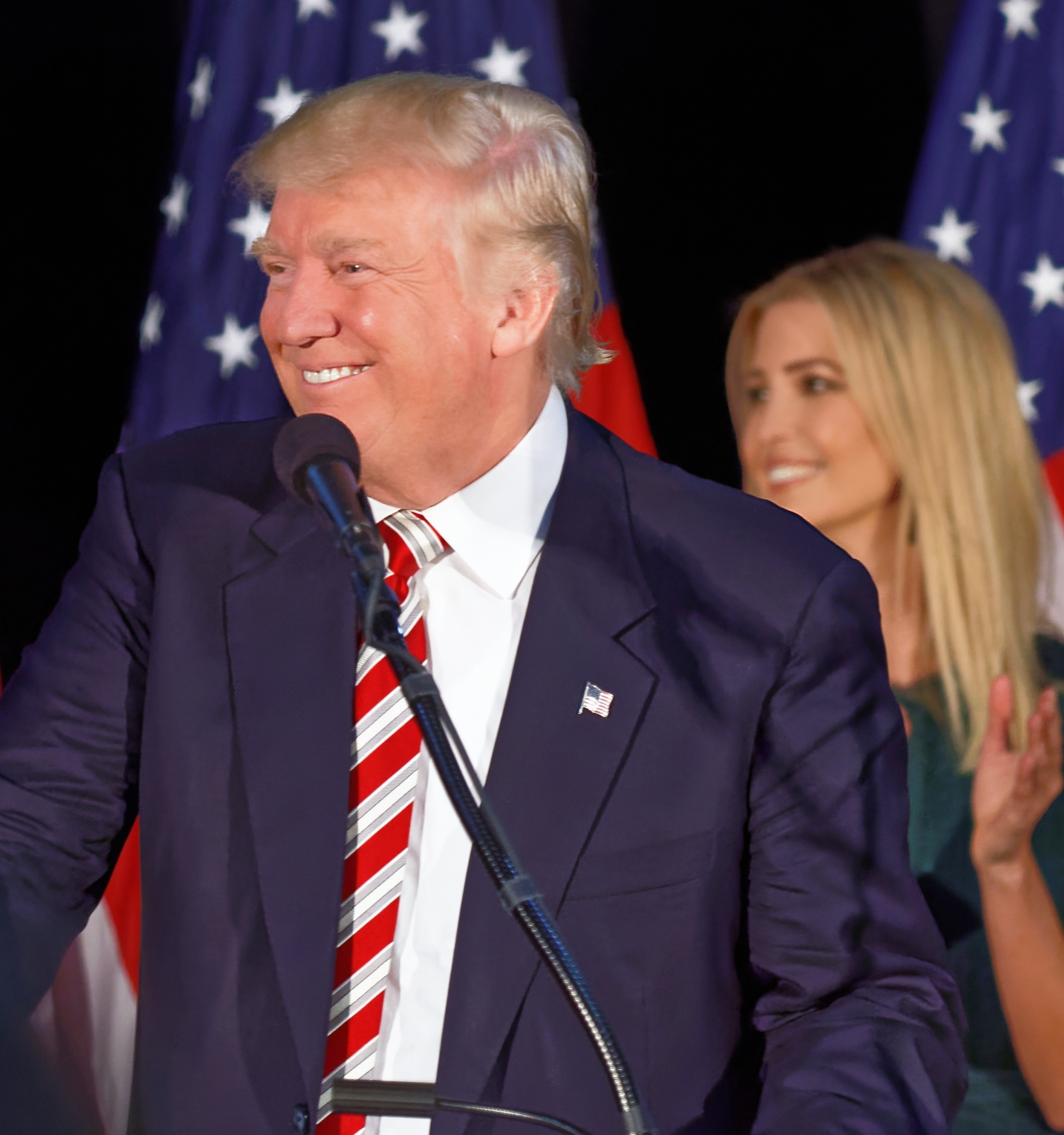
Taiwanese President Tsai Ing-wen and U.S. President-elect Donald Trump

The Trump–Tsai call was a telephone conversation between the U.S. President-elect Donald Trump and the President of the Republic of China Tsai Ing-wen which took place on December 2, 2016. This event marked the first time since 1979 that a U.S. president or President-elect had directly spoken with a ROC President. In the call, Tsai congratulated Trump for his victory in the presidential election. The two leaders spoke for around 10 minutes, focusing on politics, economy, and security in Asia-Pacific. Following the call, Trump publicized this on Twitter and Facebook and said thank you to "the President of Taiwan". After Trump's transition team confirmed the event, the Presidential Office of Taiwan released a statement about the content of the call.

Several prominent Republicans praised the call between the two leaders, saying that the United States needs no more pressure from the government of the People's Republic of China (commonly called "China"), which does not recognize the ROC government and claims Taiwan is part of its territory. Some commentators from U.S. media outlets said that the call humiliated Beijing as it seemed a violation of a diplomatic practice. Other media and comments criticized the One-China policy, saying that Trump's move was morally right and strategically correct for American interests. Wang Yi, the Foreign Minister of the People's Republic of China subsequently responded that this event is only a "small trick" played by Taiwan and will not change the One-China Policy. A spokesperson for the Presidential Office in Taipei expressed that there is no conflict between the Cross-Strait relations and the Taiwan–U.S. relations. The Obama administration stated that the U.S. would uphold the One-China Policy. Trump later responded by saying that the U.S. did not have to follow that policy.

== Background ==
In 1972, U.S. President Richard Nixon visited Mainland China, and met with Chinese Communist Party (CCP) Chairman Mao Zedong and Premier Zhou Enlai, then the two parties agreed on the "One-China" policy (i.e. the positions of then governments of the two sides across the Taiwan Strait "at that time" both claim there is only "one China" in the world). In 1978 President Jimmy Carter's administration formally cut ties with the Republic of China (ROC) on Taiwan, establishing relations with the PRC. Since the severing of diplomatic relations, the Presidents of the United States and the Republic of China have never formally met or made calls in line with the policy. But the 1979 Act of Congress Taiwan Relations Act and the 1982 Six Assurances between the governments between U.S. and Taiwan have defined the substantial relations between the peoples of the United States and Taiwan.

After Tsai Ing-wen's victory in Taiwan's presidential election in 2016, analysts predicted that Tsai's Democratic Progressive Party would install a largely pro-American government, in contrast to that of former President Ma Ying-jeou's Kuomintang, which called for close co-operation with Beijing.

== Call ==
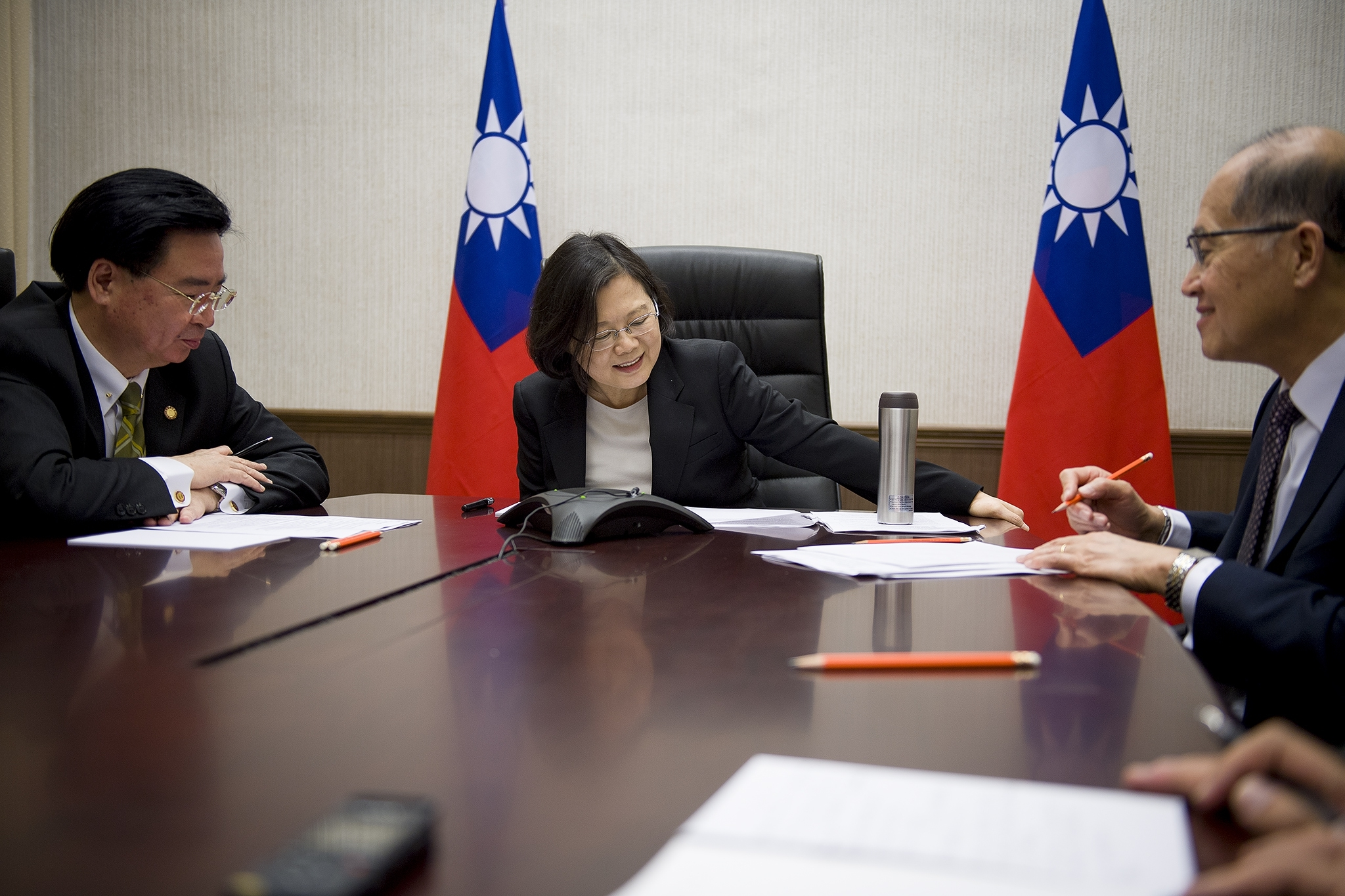
President of Taiwan Tsai Ing-wen made the phone call to U.S. President-elect Donald Trump on December 2. Also pictured were Joseph Wu, Secretary-General of the National Security Council (left), and David Lee, Minister of Foreign Affairs (right).

After the call on December 2, Donald Trump wrote on Twitter: "The President of Taiwan CALLED ME today to wish me congratulations on winning the Presidency. Thank you!" and then hours later "Interesting how the U.S. sells Taiwan billions of dollars of military equipment but I should not accept a congratulatory call."

On December 4, Trump raised doubt on Twitter: "Did China ask us if it was OK to devalue their currency (making it hard for our companies to compete), heavily tax our products going into their country (the U.S. doesn't tax them) or to build a massive military complex in the middle of the South China Sea? I don't think so!"

== Reactions ==
=== Trump transition team ===
Vice President-elect Mike Pence said "the conversation with the President of Taiwan was a courtesy call." "It's striking to me that President Obama would reach out to a murdering dictator in Cuba and be hailed as a hero. And President-elect Donald Trump takes a courtesy call from the democratically-elected President of Taiwan and it becomes something of a thing in the media." "You're going to see ... President Donald Trump ... engage the world on America's terms."

Former House Speaker Newt Gingrich, a close adviser to Trump, praised the President-elect's conversation with Taiwanese President of 23.5 million people as he would be to communicate with the democratically elected leader of any nation. He compares Trump's Taiwan call to President Obama's visit to Cuba to hang out with the Castro dictatorship and suggests the dialogue resets a more favorable relationship for the U.S. with China. "...State Department mythology that we have to somehow let the Chinese dictate to us is nonsense... They are not going to be able to intimidate us." He urged Trump to reform the DOS to more closely align with American values.

=== Congress ===
House Speaker Paul Ryan said, "I spoke with the President of Taiwan when she was transferring planes in Miami a couple months ago. It is prudent for the President-elect to take congratulatory calls — absolutely. I think for him to not take a congratulatory call would in and of itself be considered a snub. So I think everything is fine."

Senator Tom Cotton commends President-elect Trump for his conversation with President Tsai Ing-wen, which reaffirms U.S. commitment "America's policy toward Taiwan is governed by the Taiwan Relations Act, under which we maintain close ties with Taiwan and support its democratic system... I have met with President Tsai twice and I'm confident she expressed to the president-elect the same desire for closer relations with the United States."

Chair of the Subcommittee on Asia and the Pacific Matt Salmon applauded Trump's historic conversation and said "America has always been a champion of democratic values and individual freedoms, and I applaud the President-elect for making a strong statement in support of those values around the world."

Congressman Dana Rohrabacher applauded Trump's phone call with Taiwan's president was "terrific" because of the diplomatic warning it sent to China. He said that, "He showed the dictators in Beijing that he's not a pushover. China has had an enormously aggressive foreign policy and by him actually going to Taiwan, he's showing the people in Beijing that they cannot have this aggressive foreign policy and expect to be treated just the same by an American president."

=== Experts and media ===
Former Governor of Utah as well as U.S. Ambassador to Singapore and China Jon Huntsman says "The call came in from President Tsai Ing-wen. He made the choice to take it, which I think was absolutely right... I'm sure he's got a broader strategy."

Former US Ambassador to the United Nations John Bolton also supports Trump's interaction with President of Taiwan with democratic government, free press, and free-market economic system. He said, "Nobody in Beijing gets to dictate who we talk to. It's ridiculous to think that the phone call upsets decades of anything." "We should shake the relationship up. For the past several years China has made aggressive... belligerent claims in the South China Sea."

Former deputy Undersecretary of the Navy and Professor Seth Cropsey said claiming that democratic Taiwan is part of the totalitarian People's Republic of China is just like the story of The Emperor's New Clothes.

Former managing editor of Foreign Affairs, contributing editor of Time magazine, and now CNN host Fareed Zakaria said the President-elect Trump's call with President Tsai Ing-wen of Taiwan was not a bad idea while some people are getting a bit too critical. "The truth of the matter is we need leverage with China... on many issues we need to be able to push them harder... The key here is that it should be part of a thought-through strategy."
