= Taiwan Security Enhancement Act =

Failed U.S. bill

- Long title: To assist in the enhancement of the security of Taiwan, and for other purposes.
- Announced in: the 106th United States Congress
- Sponsored by: Rep. Tom DeLay (R, TX-22)

Legislative history
- Introduced in the House as H.R. 1838 by Rep. Tom DeLay (R, TX-22) on May 18, 1999; Committee consideration by House Foreign Affairs, House Armed Services; Passed the House on February 1, 2000 (341–70)

The Taiwan Security Enhancement Act (H.R. 1838) was a U.S. Congressional bill which never became law. On February 1, 2000, the bill was passed by one body of the U.S. Congress, the House of Representatives, by a vote of 341 to 70. It envisaged greater United States military support of the Republic of China/Taiwan, including training and equipment. It also contemplated establishing direct military communication lines between the United States and Taiwan. It was never approved by the U.S. Senate or signed into law by the U.S. president.

Its proponents intended the proposed law to strengthen and update the Taiwan Relations Act, which was passed soon after the U.S. ceased official relations with the Republic of China (now commonly known as Taiwan) on December 31, 1978, and instead recognized the People's Republic of China on January 1, 1979. President Jimmy Carter had unilaterally withdrawn from the Sino-American Mutual Defense Treaty establishing a defense pact between the United States and the Republic of China in January 1979, and the Taiwan Relations Act was Congress's response to enforce § Checks and balances and prevent excessive unilateral foreign policy change at the hands of the President without consent of Congress.

== U.S. President opposed proposed law ==
The U.S. president at the time, Bill Clinton, opposed the proposed legislation. However, most Democrats in Congress supported the legislation despite President Clinton's opposition.

== Beijing response ==
From the Chinese perspective, the bill was incompatible with the policies of the previous six United States administrations, particularly Ronald Reagan's 1982 Joint Communique. The Chinese Government's spokesperson, responding to press inquiries, gave the Beijing Government's response as follows:

A few members of the U.S. Congress have tried hard to push for the adoption of the Taiwan Security Enhancement Act. The essence is to, through strengthened domestic legislation, provide the so-called legal basis for the provision of various sophisticated weapons and equipment by the U.S. to Taiwan and the establishment and enhancement of direct links between the armed forces in the U.S. and Taiwan. The attempt has gravely threatened peace and stability across the Taiwan Straits and the China-U.S. relations. The Chinese Government and people have, from the very beginning, expressed their strong condemnation of and resolute opposition to the Act, and have lodged serious representation with the U.S. side. The Chinese side has taken note of the fact that the U.S. Government has expressed its opposition to the adoption of the Act by the U.S. Congress. The Chinese side strongly urges the members of the U.S. Congress to stop at once this erroneous act of interfering in the internal affairs of China by using the question of Taiwan, and urges the U.S. Government to abide by the three China U.S. Joint Communiques, see clearly the harmful effect of the Act, and adopt concrete and effective measures to prevent it from becoming law so as not to seriously undermine the China-U.S. relations.

== See also ==
- Political status of Taiwan
- China–United States relations
- Taiwan–United States relations
