= Taiwan Allies International Protection and Enhancement Initiative Act =

United States law strengthening US-Taiwan political and commercial relations

Taiwan Allies International Protection and Enhancement Initiative (TAIPEI) Act of 2019
- Long title: An Act to express United States support for Taiwan's diplomatic alliances around the world.
- Acronyms (colloquial): TAIPEI Act
- Enacted by: the 116th United States Congress
- Effective: March 26, 2020

Citations
- Public law: Pub. L. 116–135 (text) (PDF)
- Statutes at Large: 134 Stat. 278

Legislative history
- Introduced in the Senate as S.1678 by Cory Gardner (R-CO) on May 23, 2019; Committee consideration by House Foreign Affairs, House Ways and Means, Senate Foreign Relations; Passed the Senate on October 29, 2019 (unanimous consent); Passed the House on March 4, 2020 (415–0) with amendment; Senate agreed to House amendment on March 11, 2020 (unanimous consent); Signed into law by President Donald Trump on March 26, 2020

The Taiwan Allies International Protection and Enhancement Initiative (TAIPEI) Act of 2019 (TAIPEI Act; Pub. L. 116–135 (text) (PDF), 134 Stat. 278, enacted March 26, 2020; S. 1678) is an Act of the United States Congress. It aims to increase the scope of US relations with Taiwan and encourage other nations and international organizations to strengthen their official and unofficial ties with the island nation.

The law is considered a further upgrade to Taiwan–United States relations after passing the Taiwan Travel Act in 2018 and was passed at a time in which the People's Republic of China was engaged in a campaign to restrict the diplomatic space of Taiwan.

== Background ==
After Tsai Ing-wen was inaugurated as President of Taiwan in 2016, the People's Republic of China (mainland China) started an extensive campaign to isolate the island state internationally, and by 2019 the number of countries maintaining official relations with Taipei had fallen from 22 to 15. Meanwhile, following the election of Donald Trump as U.S. president, U.S.–China relations had deteriorated, especially since the start of the China–United States trade war in 2018. While Taiwan felt its international space shrinking, relations with the US saw major breakthroughs, including a phone call between Trump and Tsai, the passage of the Taiwan Travel Act, and cabinet-level meetings between the two countries. In order to disincentivize remaining countries to switch recognition away from Taiwan, and to allow the island greater participation in international organizations, the TAIPEI Act was conceived.

== Provisions ==
Provisions of the TAIPEI Act state that the U.S. should:

- Advocate, as appropriate, for Taiwan's membership in all international organizations in which statehood is not a requirement and in which the United States is also a participant; and for Taiwan to be granted observer status in other appropriate international organizations;
- To instruct, as appropriate, representatives of the United States Government in all organizations to use the voice, vote, and influence of the United States to advocate for Taiwan's membership or observer status in such organizations;
- To advocate, as appropriate, for Taiwan's membership or observer status in all organizations as part of any relevant bilateral engagements between the United States and the People's Republic of China, including leader summits and the U.S.-China Comprehensive Economic Dialogue.

== Reaction ==
=== Domestic ===
Speaker of the House Nancy Pelosi underlined the bipartisan support that helped pass the act and stated that it "celebrates and supports Taiwan’s commitment to democracy, by preserving and promoting its position on the international stage."

=== Taiwan ===
After the U.S. House of Representatives unanimously passed the act, Taiwanese President Tsai Ing-wen expressed thanks and said that "her country will continue to work with the U.S. to contribute to the peaceful and stable development of the Indo-Pacific Region."

=== People's Republic of China ===
China opposed the passing of the act, calling the move a severe violation of the one-China principle and the three China-U.S. joint communiques. It reiterated its stance that China has long been opposed to any form of official exchanges between Taiwan and the United States.

== See also ==
- Taiwan Relations Act
- Taiwan Travel Act
- Six Assurances
- Political status of Taiwan
