= Three Communiqués =

Foundational documents in United States–People's Republic of China relations

Three Joint Communiqués
- Created: 1972–1982
- Location: Shanghai, Beijing (PRC); Washington, D.C. (US)
- Signatories: Richard Nixon & Zhou Enlai (1972); Jimmy Carter & Deng Xiaoping (1979); Ronald Reagan & Zhao Ziyang (1982)
- Media type: Diplomatic joint statements
- Subject: Sino-American relations, One China policy, and geopolitical stability
- Purpose: Primary diplomatic framework governing official relations between the United States and the People's Republic of China.

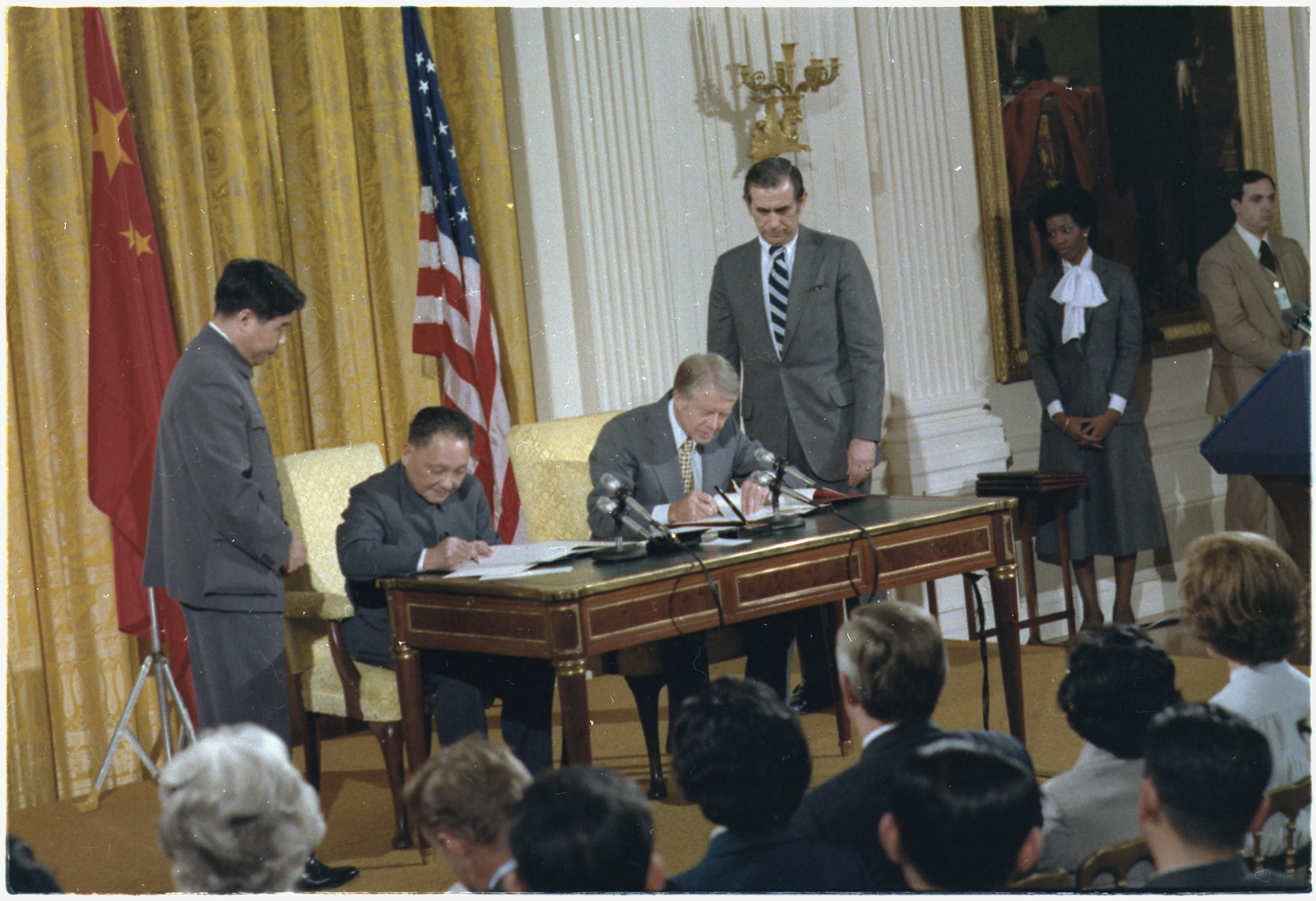
Chinese Vice Premier Deng Xiaoping and US President Jimmy Carter during the former's visit to the US, when the second communiqué was released.

The Three Communiqués or Three Joint Communiqués (Chinese: 三个联合公报) are a collection of three joint statements made by the governments of the United States (US) and the People's Republic of China (PRC). The communiqués played a crucial role in the establishment of relations between the US and the PRC and continue to be an essential element in dialogue between the two states, along with the Six Assurances and Taiwan Relations Act.

== 1st ==
The first communiqué (February 28, 1972), known as the Shanghai Communiqué, summarizes the landmark dialogue begun by President Richard Nixon and Premier Zhou Enlai during February 1972. Some of the issues addressed in this communiqué include the two sides' views on Vietnam, the Korean Peninsula, India and Pakistan and the Kashmir region, and perhaps most importantly, the Taiwan (Republic of China) issue (i.e., Taiwan's political status). Essentially, both sides agreed to respect each other's national sovereignty and territorial integrity. The United States formally acknowledged that "all Chinese on either side of the Taiwan Strait maintain there is but one China and that Taiwan is a part of China" and that the "United States Government does not challenge that position", and that it "reaffirms its interest in a peaceful settlement of the Taiwan question by the Chinese themselves".

The use of the word "acknowledge" (rather than "accept") is often cited as an example of the United States' ambiguous position regarding the future of Taiwan.

== 2nd ==
Jimmy Carter on relations with China and the 2nd communique, 1979.

The second communiqué (January 1, 1979), the Joint Communiqué on the Establishment of Diplomatic Relations, formally announces the commencement of normal relations between the United States and the People's Republic of China. In so doing, the United States recognized that the government of the People's Republic of China was the sole legal government of China, and acknowledged the PRC's position that Taiwan is part of China. In addition, the United States government declared that it would end formal political relations with the Republic of China ("Taiwan") while preserving economic and cultural ties. Both sides reaffirmed their wish to reduce the risk of international conflict as well as avoidance of hegemony of any nation in the Asia-Pacific region.

== 3rd ==
The third communiqué (August 17, 1982), also known as the August 17th communiqué, reaffirms the desire of both sides to further strengthen economic, cultural, educational, scientific, and technological ties. Both sides also reaffirmed the statements made about the Taiwan issue in the previous communiqué. Although no definitive conclusions were reached on the issue of arms sale to Taiwan, the United States declared its intent to continue selling arms to Taiwan and to gradually change its level of arms sales consistent with the PRC's militarization of the Taiwan strait.

A declassified cable sent on July 10, 1982, from Secretary of State Lawrence Eagleburger to AIT director James R. Lilley explained that reducing arms sales to Taiwan would be contingent on the commitment of the PRC to a peace across the Taiwan Strait. Afterwards, the US clarified the third communique by issuing the Six Assurances to Taiwan.

== See also ==
- China-United States relations
- United States-Taiwan relations
- Texts on Wikisource:
  - Shanghai Communiqué
  - Joint Communiqué on the Establishment of Diplomatic Relations
  - US-PRC Joint Communique
