= Taiwan Travel Act =

2018 US law on official travel with Taiwan

- Long title: An act to encourage visits between the United States and Taiwan at all levels, and for other purposes.
- Acronyms (colloquial): TTA
- Enacted by: the 115th United States Congress
- Effective: March 16, 2018

Citations
- Public law: Pub. L. 115–135 (text) (PDF)

Legislative history
- Introduced in the House as H.R. 535 by Steve Chabot (R-OH) on January 13, 2017; Committee consideration by House Foreign Affairs, Senate Foreign Relations; Passed the House on January 9, 2018 (Voice vote); Passed the Senate on February 28, 2018 (Unanimous consent); Signed into law by President Donald Trump on March 16, 2018

The Taiwan Travel Act (H.R. 535, Pub. L. 115–135 (text) (PDF)) is an Act of the United States Congress. Passed on February 28, 2018, it was signed into law by President Donald Trump on March 16, 2018. As a follow-up to the Taiwan Relations Act, the law allows high-level officials of the United States to visit Taiwan and vice versa.

The law is considered a substantial upgrade to Taiwan–United States relations, removing previous restrictions on travels for the officials. As such, the law was harshly criticized by the government of the People's Republic of China (which had formally protested the bill) for violating the one China principle, a position held by Beijing asserting that Taiwan is an inalienable sovereign part of China.

== Background ==
When the U.S. established diplomatic relations with the People's Republic of China in 1979, it also ceased to officially recognize Taiwan but continued to maintain unofficial relations with the island. In the same year, the U.S. enacted the Taiwan Relations Act.

In 2016, the Taiwan Travel Act was introduced to the U.S. Congress by Representative Steve Chabot and Senator Marco Rubio; members of the House Foreign Relations Committee and the Senate Foreign Relations Committee, respectively. The bill was considered a follow-up to the Taiwan Relations Act and stated that the U.S. and Taiwan had suffered from insufficient high-level communication since 1979, when the U.S. started to restrict its officials' visits to Taiwan.

=== Chinese pressure on Congress ===
In August 2017, Cui Tiankai, the Chinese Ambassador to the United States, sent a letter expressing "grave concern" to leaders of the House and Senate, demanding they block provisions related to Taiwan in the National Defense Authorization Act of that year, which included the Taiwan Travel Act as well as the Taiwan Security Act of 2017. In the letter, Ambassador Cui stated the legislation together with another bill (that had not passed) represent “provocations against China's sovereignty, national unity and security interests,” and “have crossed the ‘red line’ on the stability of the China-U.S. relationship”. US lawmakers perceived this wording, together with the Chinese threat of “severe consequences” as inappropriate interference and "out of line".

==== American responses ====
A Democratic aide stated that issuing threats and setting “red lines” regarding U.S. domestic legislation was not a constructive way to build relations between the United States and China. The Washington Post journalist Josh Rogin reported that congressional aides said other foreign embassies generally seek to influence Congress through relationship-building and persuasion, rather than threats, and that China's approach differed from this norm.

Representative Eliot Engel, then the ranking Democrat on the House Foreign Affairs Committee, said that China had used similar tactics with other countries and expressed concern that such methods were being directed at the U.S. Congress. Some commentators argued that these actions may have backfired by encouraging Congress to take a stronger stance in response to what they viewed as coercive behavior.

== Legislative history ==
On October 12, 2017, the U.S. House Committee on Foreign Affairs passed the bill without opposition. Committee Chairman Ed Royce said the legislation sought to encourage more frequent official exchanges between the United States and Taiwan, including at senior levels, and criticized existing State Department restrictions on such travel. He also noted that the bill followed earlier committee legislation addressing Taiwan's exclusion from the World Health Assembly.

On October 13, 2017, a spokesperson for China's Ministry of Foreign Affairs urged the United States to adhere to the one-China principle and the three China–U.S. joint communiqués, and cautioned against official contacts with Taiwan that, in China's view, could harm bilateral relations.

In January 2018, the bill passed the House of Representatives unanimously. It was subsequently approved unanimously by the Senate on February 28, 2018. President Donald Trump signed the legislation into law on March 16, 2018.

== Provisions ==
Provisions of the Taiwan Travel Act state that the U.S. should:

- Allow officials at all levels of the U.S. government to travel to Taiwan to meet their Taiwanese counterparts;
- Allow high-level Taiwanese officials to enter the United States under respectful conditions and to meet with U.S. officials;
- Encourage the Taipei Economic and Cultural Representative Office and any other instrumentality established by Taiwan to conduct business in the United States.

== Reaction ==
=== Taiwan ===
In January 2018, Taiwanese President Tsai Ing-wen expressed her gratitude to the U.S. Congress for "supporting Taiwan's democracy" through her Twitter account, stating she believed the Taiwan Travel Act would "strengthen and enhance the long-standing partnership between the two sides." Taiwan's Ministry of Foreign Affairs also showed its support for the bill, saying Taiwan was "committed to fostering an upgraded strategic partnership with the U.S."

=== People's Republic of China ===
The Chinese state-controlled Xinhua News Agency indicated that China was "strongly dissatisfied" with the bill and said it violated the one China principle that asserts Taiwan is a province of China.

== Aftermath ==
In September 2018, Royce led a bipartisan delegation of U.S. lawmakers to Taiwan. During the visit, President Tsai Ing-wen awarded him the Order of Brilliant Star with Special Grand Cordon, citing his contributions to Taiwan.

At the ceremony on September 1, Royce said he viewed the award as reflecting close relations between the United States and Taiwan. He described Taiwan as an important U.S. partner in the Asia-Pacific region and referred to shared democratic values and expanding economic ties. Royce also reiterated U.S. commitments to Taiwan's security, citing the Taiwan Relations Act and the Six Assurances as central elements of U.S. policy.

In July 2019, Taiwanese President Tsai Ing-wen used the law to travel freely to New York and Denver, Colorado while in transit to countries in the Caribbean that still have official diplomatic relations with Taiwan. Before the law was passed, Taiwanese presidents usually could only meet local Texas government officials in Houston, Texas, where they could stopover on transit flights to the Caribbean and South America. Tsai was the first Taiwanese president to visit UN ambassadors of Taiwan's diplomatic allies in New York since the passage of the Taiwan Relations Act in 1979. In New York, she also met with a U.S. congressional delegation headed by U.S. House Foreign Affairs Chairman Eliot Engel (D-NY) and Ranking Member Michael McCaul (R-TX). In Denver, she met with the governor of Colorado, some U.S. congress members and mayors from the local area and visited the National Center for Atmospheric Research and the National Renewable Energy Laboratory.

On August 2, 2022, speaker of the House Nancy Pelosi visited Taiwan, being the highest-ranking U.S. government official to visit it in 25 years. Pelosi said her visit was a sign of the U.S. Congress's commitment to Taiwan. FAPA President Minze Chien said, "With Speaker Pelosi’s trip, it is very gratifying for us Taiwanese Americans to see this further implementation of the 2018 Taiwan Travel Act and a further loosening of restrictions on U.S. high-level visits to and from Taiwan. FAPA is very proud of the coming to fruition of this Act. Next, it behooves the U.S. Congress to invite Taiwan President Tsai Ing-wen to Washington, DC, to share with members of Congress and with the American public her views on the best ever U.S.-Taiwan relations in history that we witness today." This Congressional Delegation trip (CODEL) embodies the type of high level exchange that the Taiwan Travel Act adopted in 2018 and supported in ALEC model policy was meant to facilitate.

== See also ==
- TAIPEI Act
- Six Assurances
- Political status of Taiwan
- Foreign relations of Taiwan § United States
- Taiwan–United States relations
- China–United States relations
- Cross-Strait relations
- Two Chinas
