= Six Assurances =

United States principles regarding Taiwan

- Created: July 1982
- Presented: July 14, 1982 (Conveyed orally to Taiwan)
- Ratified: August 17, 1982 (Formally internalized alongside the Third Joint Communiqué)
- Date effective: July 14, 1982
- Amended: May 16, 2016 (House H.Con.Res.88 reaffirmation); March 26, 2020 (Codified via TAIPEI Act)
- Location: Washington, D.C. (Drafting); Taipei, Taiwan (Delivery)
- Commissioned by: Ronald Reagan (as President of the United States)
- Author(s): James R. Lilley (AIT Director) and John Holdridge (Assistant Secretary of State)
- Signatories: None (Delivered as a unilateral oral diplomatic pledge to avoid treaty status)
- Media type: Unilateral diplomatic cable (Originally oral; codified into statutory text in 2020)
- Subject: Cross-Strait relations, Foreign relations of Taiwan, Taiwan Relations Act
- Purpose: To explicitly limit the scope of the August 17 Joint Communiqué with the PRC, guaranteeing that the U.S. would not set a cutoff date for Taiwan arms sales, alter the Taiwan Relations Act, or pressure Taipei into negotiations with Beijing.
- Supersedes: None
- Superseded by: None (Reaffirmed and active)

Official website
- AIT Declassified Document Page

The Six Assurances are six key foreign policy principles of the United States regarding United States–Taiwan relations. They were passed as unilateral U.S. clarifications to the Third Communiqué between the United States and the People's Republic of China in 1982. They were intended to reassure both Taiwan and the United States Congress that the U.S. would continue to support Taiwan even if it had earlier cut formal diplomatic relations.

The assurances were originally proposed by the then Kuomintang (Chinese Nationalist Party) government of the Republic of China on Taiwan during negotiations between the U.S. and the People's Republic of China. The U.S. Reagan administration agreed to the assurances and informed the United States Congress of them in July 1982.

Today, the Six Assurances are part of semiformal guidelines used in conducting relations between the U.S. and Taiwan. The assurances have been generally reaffirmed by successive U.S. administrations. Prior to 2016, they were purely informal, but in 2016, their formal content was adopted by the U.S. House of Representatives and the Senate in non-binding resolutions, upgrading their status to formal but not directly enforceable.

== Original assurances ==
Declassified cables, sent in 1982 from the State Department, detail the Six Assurances:

1. The United States has not agreed to set a date for ending arms sales to Taiwan.
2. The United States has not agreed to consult with the PRC on arms sales to Taiwan.
3. The United States will not play a mediation role between Taipei and Beijing.
4. The United States has not agreed to revise the Taiwan Relations Act.
5. The United States has not altered its position regarding sovereignty over Taiwan.
6. The United States will not exert pressure on Taiwan to enter into negotiations with the PRC.

== Legislative history ==
On May 19, 2016, one day before Tsai Ing-wen assumed the Presidency of the Republic of China, U.S. Senators Marco Rubio (R-FL), a member of the Senate Foreign Relations Committee and Senate Select Committee on Intelligence and Bob Menendez (D-NJ), former chair of the Senate Foreign Relations Committee and co-chair of the Senate Taiwan Caucus, introduced a concurrent resolution reaffirming the Taiwan Relations Act and the “Six Assurances” as cornerstones of United States–Taiwan relations.

The United States House of Representatives passed a concurrent resolution on May 16, 2016, giving the first formal wording for the Six Assurances by more or less directly adopting how the former Assistant Secretary of State for East Asian and Pacific Affairs John H. Holdridge expressed them in 1982 (which was delivered to Taiwan's President Chiang Ching-kuo by then-Director of the American Institute in Taiwan James R. Lilley). The counterpart passed the Senate on July 6, 2016.

The Asia Reassurance Initiative Act (Pub. L. 115–409 (text) (PDF)) states that it is the policy of the U.S. to enforce commitments to Taiwan consistent with the Six Assurances. As of September 2018, the Donald Trump administration "has stated that the U.S.-Taiwan relationship is also 'guided' by [the] 'Six Assurances'".

The National Defense Authorization Act for Fiscal Year 2021 reconfirmed the Taiwan Relations Act (TRA) and the Six Assurances as the foundation for U.S.-Taiwan relations.

A bill introduced in the U.S. House in May 2025 called the Six Assurances to Taiwan Act would, if passed, codify the Six Assurances into law.

== Reaffirmation and jeopardy ==
The State Department has reaffirmed the Six Assurances repeatedly.

The 2016 Republican Party platform affirmed the Six Assurances to Taiwan, supported the Taiwan Relations Act, opposed unilateral changes to the status quo, and endorsed peaceful resolution of cross-strait issues.

In November 2020 U.S. Secretary of State Mike Pompeo stated “Taiwan has not been a part of China, and that was recognized with the work that the Reagan administration did to lay out the policies that the United States has adhered to now for three and a half decades, and done so under both administrations.” which was seen as invoking clause 5.

The PRC rejects the Six Assurances. On 10 November 2021, Zhu Fenglian, the spokesperson of the Taiwan Affairs Office, said that "The U.S.'s so-called 'Taiwan Relations Act' and 'Six Assurances' violate the Sino-U.S. Joint Communiques and are a gross interference in China's internal affairs. They are totally wrong, illegal and invalid. China has firmly opposed them from the beginning".

On August 2, 2022, Speaker of the House, Nancy Pelosi, in a statement from a visit to Taiwan, made reference to the United States' continuing support of the TRA, Three Communiqués, and the Six Assurances.

In May 2026, U.S. President Donald Trump announced he would have a discussion with Chinese leader Xi Jinping on the matter of arms sales to Taiwan during his visit to China, potentially breaking with the Six Assurances. After the visit concluded, Trump confirmed that the matter of arms sales have been brought up, and said "He talked about that to me, obviously. So what am I going to do, say ‘I don’t want to talk to you about it because I have an agreement that was signed in 1982?’" In another interview, Trump said he was holding the arm sales to Taiwan "in abeyance and it depends on China" and said the arm sales are a "very good negotiating chip" with China.

== See also ==
- Political status of Taiwan
- Taiwan Relations Act
- Taiwan Travel Act, passed in 2018; further strengthening ties between the United States and Taiwan
- Taiwan–United States relations
