= Taiwan–United States relations =

- Taiwan: United States

Diplomatic mission
- Taipei Economic and Cultural Representative Office in the United States: American Institute in Taiwan

Envoy
- Representative Alexander Yui: Director Raymond F. Greene

Taiwan–United States relations
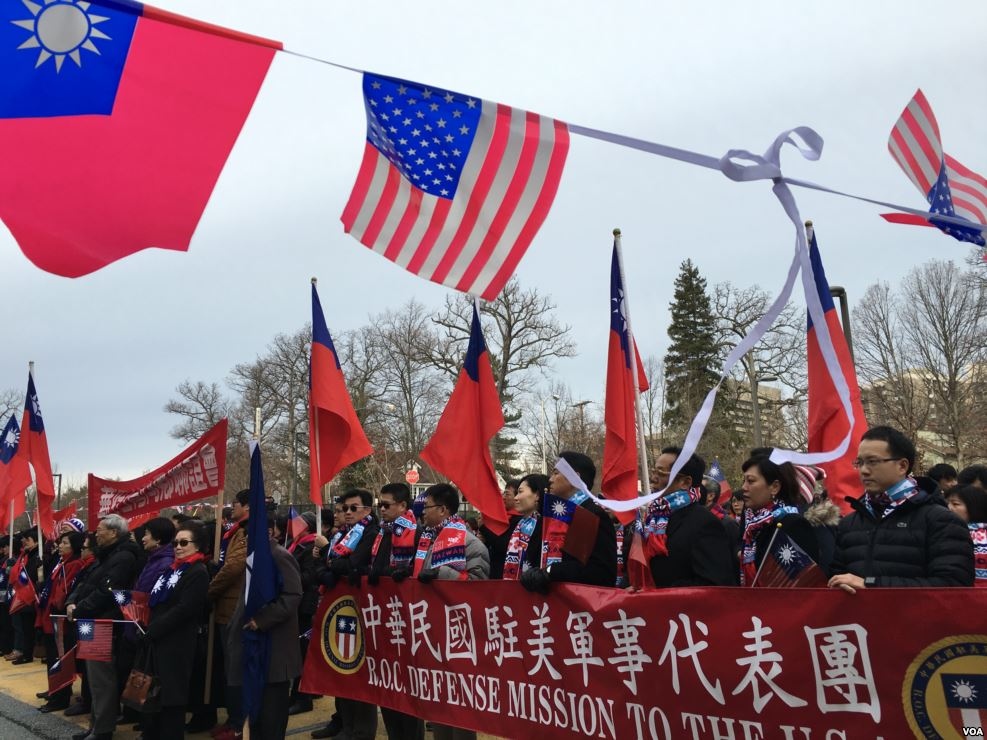
- ROC Defense Mission to the United States.
- Traditional Chinese: 臺灣與美國關係
- Simplified Chinese: 台湾与美国关系
Transcriptions
Standard Mandarin
- Hanyu Pinyin: Táiwān yǔ měiguó guānxì
- Bopomofo: ㄊㄞˊ ㄨㄢ ㄩˇ ㄇㄟˇ ㄍㄨㄛˊ ㄍㄨㄢ ㄒㄧˋ
Yue: Cantonese
- Jyutping: Toi4 waan1 jyu5 mei5 gwok3 gwaan1 hai6

Republic of China - United States relations
- Traditional Chinese: 中華民國與美國關係
- Simplified Chinese: 中华民国与美国关系
Transcriptions
Standard Mandarin
- Hanyu Pinyin: Zhōnghuá mínguó yǔ měiguó guānxì
- Bopomofo: ㄓㄨㄥ ㄏㄨㄚˊ ㄇㄧㄣˊ ㄍㄨㄛˊ ㄩˇ ㄇㄟˇ ㄍㄨㄛˊ ㄍㄨㄢ ㄒㄧˋ
Yue: Cantonese
- Jyutping: Zung1 waa4 man4 gwok3 jyu5 mei5 gwok3 gwaan1 hai6

Taiwan–United States relations are unofficial and informal. Both sides maintain representative offices functioning as de facto embassies. Taiwan is represented by the Taipei Economic and Cultural Representative Office in the United States, while the U.S. government is represented by the American Institute in Taiwan.

Taiwan is the United States' ninth-largest trading partner. The U.S. has viewed Taiwan as geostrategically important given its key location in the first island chain. The United States follows its Taiwan Relations Act (TRA), which allows it to have relations with the Taiwanese people and their government, whose name is not specified in that law.

As stipulated by the TRA, the United States remains the main provider of arms to Taiwan. The relations have been further grounded in the Six Assurances, which was a response to the third communiqué issued when the United States established diplomatic relations with the People's Republic of China (PRC) in 1979.

Over the past four decades, the U.S. government's policy of deliberate ambiguity toward Taiwan has been viewed as critical to stabilizing cross-strait relations by seeking to deter the PRC from using force toward the region and dissuade Taiwan from seeking independence. However, in recent years as Beijing escalated its moves and further clarified its intentions, the effectiveness of strategic ambiguity became a topic of debate in academic and policy communities.

The Taiwan Travel Act, passed by the U.S. Congress on March 16, 2018, allows high-level U.S. officials to visit Taiwan and vice versa. Both sides have since signed a consular agreement formalizing their existent consular relations on September 13, 2019. The US government removed self-imposed restrictions on executive branch contacts with Taiwan on January 9, 2021.

== History ==
=== Background ===
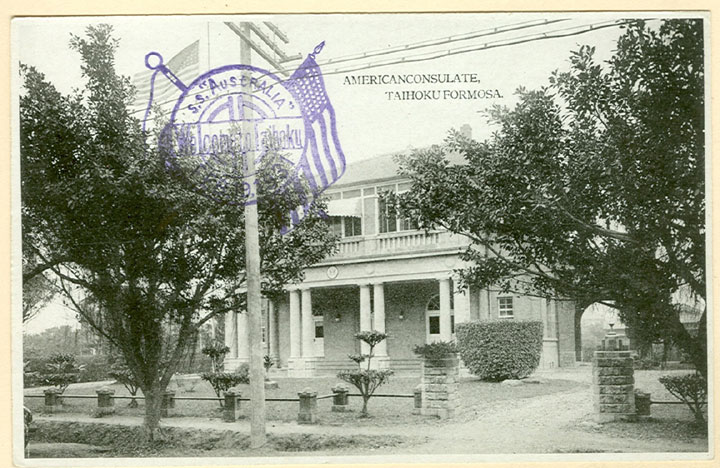
American Consulate in Taihoku, Formosa

Two American diplomats in the 1850s suggested to Washington that the U.S. should obtain the island of Taiwan from China, but the idea was rejected. Aboriginals in Taiwan often attacked and massacred shipwrecked western sailors, and American diplomats tried to help them. In 1867, during the Rover incident, a group of Taiwanese Indigenous people killed the crew of a wrecked American ship. A subsequent U.S. military expedition attempted retaliation but was defeated in a skirmish, resulting in the death of another American.

During the period of Japanese rule over Taiwan (then Formosa), the United States operated a consulate in Taihoku (now Taipei), beginning in 1913. The consulate was closed in 1941 due to United States declaration of war on Japan. In 1997, the building, housing the Taipei Film House was listed as historic monument by the Taiwanese government.

During the Pacific War, the United States and the Republic of China (then based in mainland China) were allied against Japan that was occupying the island of Taiwan (Formosa). As early as 1943, the United States Army Air Forces launched several air raids against military and industrial targets in Japanese Taiwan. After American ground forces captured Subic Bay in the Philippines, the Allied air forces began larger and more systematic air raids against targets on the island of Taiwan. On 31 May 1945, units of the Fifth Air Force consisting of 117 Consolidated B-24 Liberator heavy bombers were sent to conduct the largest air raid ever on Taiwan. The non-stop bombing began around 10 in the morning and lasted for three hours. The Americans met virtually no resistance from the Japanese, mainly due to the attrition the Japanese air forces had suffered in the Formosa Air Battle, which completely exhausted Japan's fighter units in Taiwan. The Allied forces dropped approximately 3,800 bombs on military units and governmental facilities in Taihoku (Taipei), including the Office of the Governor-General of Taiwan (today the Presidential Office Building), and killing more than 3000 civilians.

In October 1945, a month after Japan's surrender, representatives of Chinese leader Chiang Kai-shek, on behalf of the Allies, were sent to Formosa to accept the surrender of Japanese troops. However, during the period of the 1940s, there was no recognition by the United States Government that Taiwan had ever been incorporated into Chinese national territory. Chiang continued to remain suspicious of America's motives.

=== ROC recognition period ===
Badge of the Military Assistance Advisory Group (MAAG)

Badge of the United States Taiwan Defense Command (USTDC)

Two major US military units in Taiwan during the Cold War.

After being defeated by Chinese Communist Party (CCP) forces in the Chinese Civil War in 1949, the Nationalist government of the Republic of China retreated to Taiwan. In August 1949, the United States suspended the Republic of China's participation in the Fulbright Program, as the ROC government, then in retreat, was unable to continue payments on surplus war materials purchased from the United States following World War II. On January 5, 1950, United States President Harry S. Truman issued a statement that the United States would not become involved in "the civil conflict in China" and would not provide military aid or advice to the Nationalist forces in Taiwan. On February 6, 1950, the ROC Air Force bombed Shanghai, causing extensive damage to American-owned property in the city including the Shanghai power company. The American government responded by sending a diplomatic protest to the ROC Ministry of Foreign Affairs.

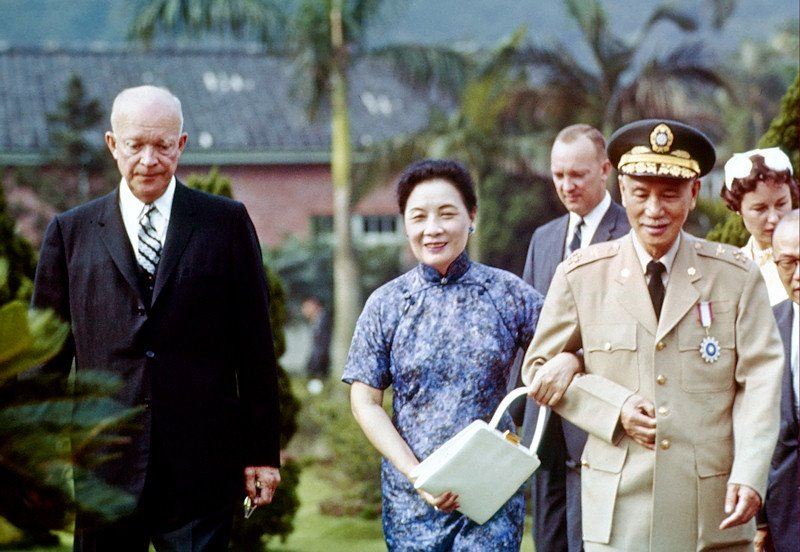
US President Eisenhower, First lady Soong Mei-ling, and ROC President Chiang Kai-shek in Taiwan, 1960.

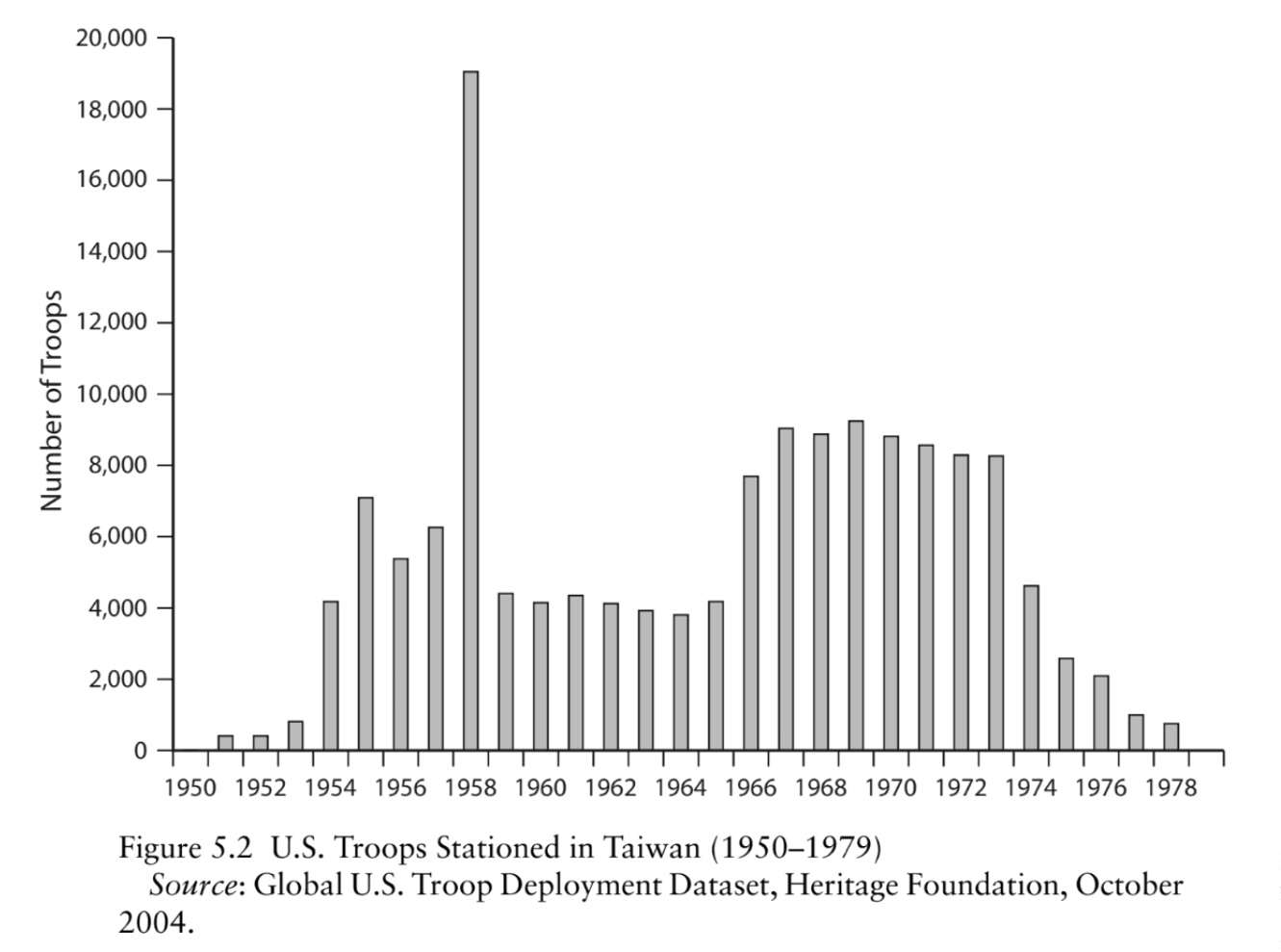
Number of U.S. Troops Stationed in Taiwan (1950–1979)

As the Korean War broke out in 1950, the United States resumed military aid to the ROC and sent the US Navy's Seventh Fleet into the Taiwan Strait. US military presence in Taiwan consisted of the Military Assistance Advisory Group (MAAG) and the United States Taiwan Defense Command (USTDC). Other notable units included the 327th Air Division. United States military, technical, and economic aid to Taiwan increased following China's entry into the Korean War in late October 1950. United States General Douglas MacArthur described Taiwan as an "unsinkable aircraft carrier" and visited the island during the war.

Until the U.S. formally recognized the People's Republic of China in 1979, the U.S. had provided ROC with financial grants based on the Foreign Assistance Act, Mutual Security Act, and Act for International Development enacted by the US Congress. Taiwan became a top recipient of United States aid in the following years.

During a visit to Taiwan in 1953, U.S. Vice President Richard Nixon stated that the United States would support the development of Taiwan as an anti-communist military and cultural stronghold. The Sino-American Mutual Defense Treaty was signed between the US and ROC in 1954 and lasted until 1979. In 1954, the United States began providing significant funding for education in Taiwan, including to attract overseas Chinese. These efforts also helped the KMT to consolidate its power on Taiwan.

However, persistent mistrust of the United States plagued Chiang Kai-shek since World War II and lasted into his rule in Taiwan, driven by the perceived possible abandonment since the loss of mainland China, inconsistent support and Washington's shifting Cold War priorities. Chiang even suspected that the United States was plotting to overthrow him with the help of his closest associates or with leftists and Taiwanese independence activists. The Sun Li-jen incident was a prominent example of Chiang's paranoia, as Sun, a KMT general who was educated at the American Virginia Military Institute, was accused of working with the CIA to remove Chiang from power.

On 24 May 1957, an angry mob stormed and sacked the U.S. Embassy and Information Service in Taipei, triggered by the acquittal of U.S. Army Sergeant Robert G. Reynolds for killing a Taiwanese citizen. The unrest caused significant damage, injuring 11 foreign nationals and 62 policemen and compelled the Chiang Kai-shek government to express profound regret for the rare anti-American protest.

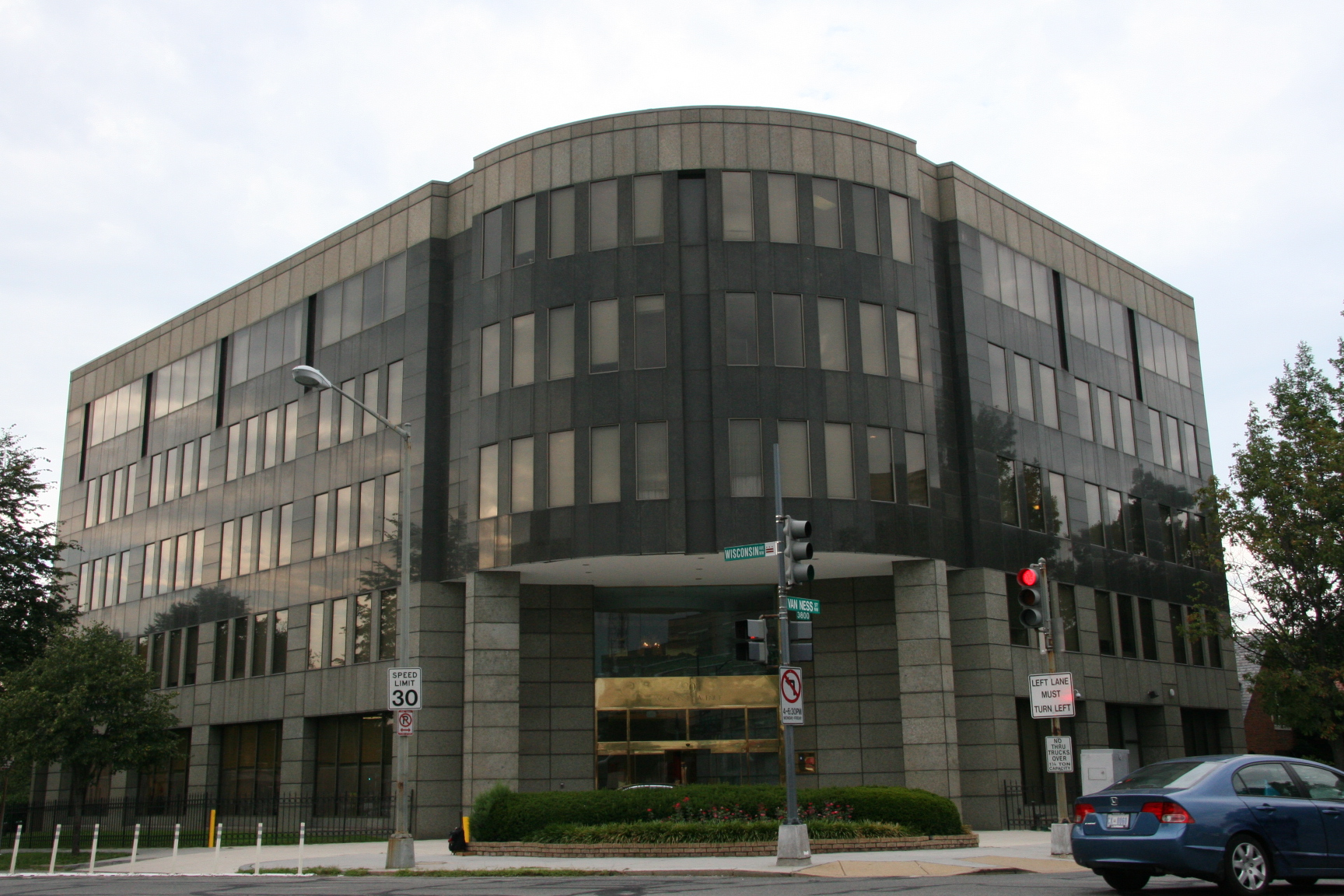
Taiwan Representative Office in Washington, D.C., United States

The U.S. State Department's official position on Taiwan in 1959 was:

That the provisional capital of the Republic of China has been at Taipei, Taiwan (Formosa) since December 1949; that the Government of the Republic of China exercises authority over the island; that the sovereignty of Formosa has not been transferred to China; and that Formosa is not a part of China as a country, at least not as yet, and not until and unless appropriate treaties are hereafter entered into. Formosa may be said to be a territory or an area occupied and administered by the Government of the Republic of China, but is not officially recognized as being a part of the Republic of China.

— U.S. State Department, 1959,

On April 24, 1970, Taiwanese activist Peter Huang attempted to assassinate Chiang Ching-kuo in New York City.

=== After US–PRC normalization ===
During the early Cold War the United States deployed nuclear weapons on Taiwan as part of the United States Taiwan Defense Command. In 1972, United States president Richard Nixon ordered nuclear weapons to be removed from Taiwan and this was implemented by 1974.

In the 1970s, the Kuomintang (KMT) government, led by Executive Yuan Premier Chiang Ching-kuo, launched a people's diplomacy campaign in the United States aimed at rallying public and political opposition to the People's Republic of China through demonstrations and petitions. Among these efforts, the KMT worked with the John Birch Society to launch a petition writing campaign through which Americans were urged to write their local government officials and ask them to "Cut the Red China connection."

During its martial law period (1949 to 1987), the Taiwan government surveilled Taiwanese abroad, most often in Japan and in the United States. The United States Federal Bureau of Investigation often cooperated with or allowed the KMT to surveil Taiwanese students and other Taiwanese migrants in the United States.

According to a 1979 report by the United States Senate Foreign Relations Committee, the Taiwan government operated one of the two most active anti-dissident networks within the United States, with agents infiltrated within universities and campus organizations and large-scale propaganda campaigns implemented through front organizations.

In 1979 and 1980, a series of bombings targeted KMT offices and officials in the United States. The United States placed the World United Formosans for Independence on its terrorist organization watch list as a result.

At the height of the Sino-Soviet Split, and at the start of the reform and opening of People's Republic of China, the United States strategically switched diplomatic recognition from the Republic of China (ROC) to the People's Republic of China (PRC) on January 1, 1979, to counter the political influences and military threats from the Soviet Union. The US Embassy in Taipei was 'migrated' to Beijing and the Taiwanese Embassy in the US was closed. Following the termination of diplomatic relations, the United States terminated its Mutual Defense Treaty with Taiwan on January 1, 1980. The switch ended the PRC's intermittent bombardment of the ROC's Kinmen Island that had begun with the Second Taiwan Strait Crisis.

On April 10, 1979, U.S. President Jimmy Carter signed into law the Taiwan Relations Act, which created domestic legal authority for the conduct of unofficial relations with Taiwan. U.S. commercial, cultural, and other interaction with the people on Taiwan is facilitated through the American Institute in Taiwan, a private nonprofit corporation. The institute has its headquarters in the Washington area and has a main office in Taipei and a branch office in Kaohsiung. It is authorized to issue visas, accept passport applications, and provide assistance to U.S. citizens in Taiwan. A counterpart mission, the Taipei Economic and Cultural Representative Office in the United States, has been established by Taiwan. The representative office located in Washington, DC, and has 12 other Taipei Economic and Cultural Offices in the continental U.S. and Guam. The Taiwan Relations Act continues to provide the legal basis for the unofficial relationship between the U.S. and Taiwan, and enshrines the U.S. commitment to assisting Taiwan maintain its defensive capability.

Taiwan helped Ronald Reagan circumvent the Boland Amendment by providing covert support to the Contras in Nicaragua.

Reagan pressured Taiwan into giving up its Sky Horse ballistic missile program.

Taiwan's secret nuclear weapons program was revealed after the 1987 Lieyu massacre, when Colonel Chang Hsien-yi Deputy Director of Nuclear Research at INER, who was secretly working for the CIA, defected to the U.S. in December 1987 and produced a cache of incriminating documents. The CIA oversaw negotiations with the Taiwanese which led them to abandon their nuclear ambitions in return for security guarantees. Since the end of the nuclear weapons program the "Nuclear Card" has played an important part in Taiwan's relationship with the United States.

=== Post-democratization ===
==== 1990s ====
In 1997 the Speaker of the United States House of Representatives, Newt Gingrich, visited Taiwan and met with President Lee Teng-hui.

In 1999 former President Jimmy Carter visited Taiwan.

==== 2000s ====
President Bush was asked on 25 April 2001, "if Taiwan were attacked by China, do we (The U.S.) have an obligation to defend the Taiwanese?" He responded, "Yes, we do...and the Chinese must understand that. The United States would do whatever it took to help Taiwan defend herself." He made it understood that "though we (China and the U.S.) have common interests, the Chinese must understand that there will be some areas where we disagree." On the advice of his advisors, Bush later made clear to the press that there was no change in American policy.

In July 2002, Minister of Justice Chen Ding-nan became the first Taiwanese government official to be invited into the White House since 1979.

==== 2010s ====
On 24 August 2010, the United States State Department announced a change to commercial sales of military equipment in place of the previous foreign military sales in the hope of avoiding political implications. However pressure from the PRC has continued and it seems unlikely that Taiwan will be provided with advanced submarines or jet fighters.

The Taiwan Policy Act of 2013 was raised and passed in the House Committee on Foreign Affairs by the US Congress to update the conditions of US-Taiwan relations. In 2015 Kin Moy was appointed to the Director of the American Institute in Taiwan.

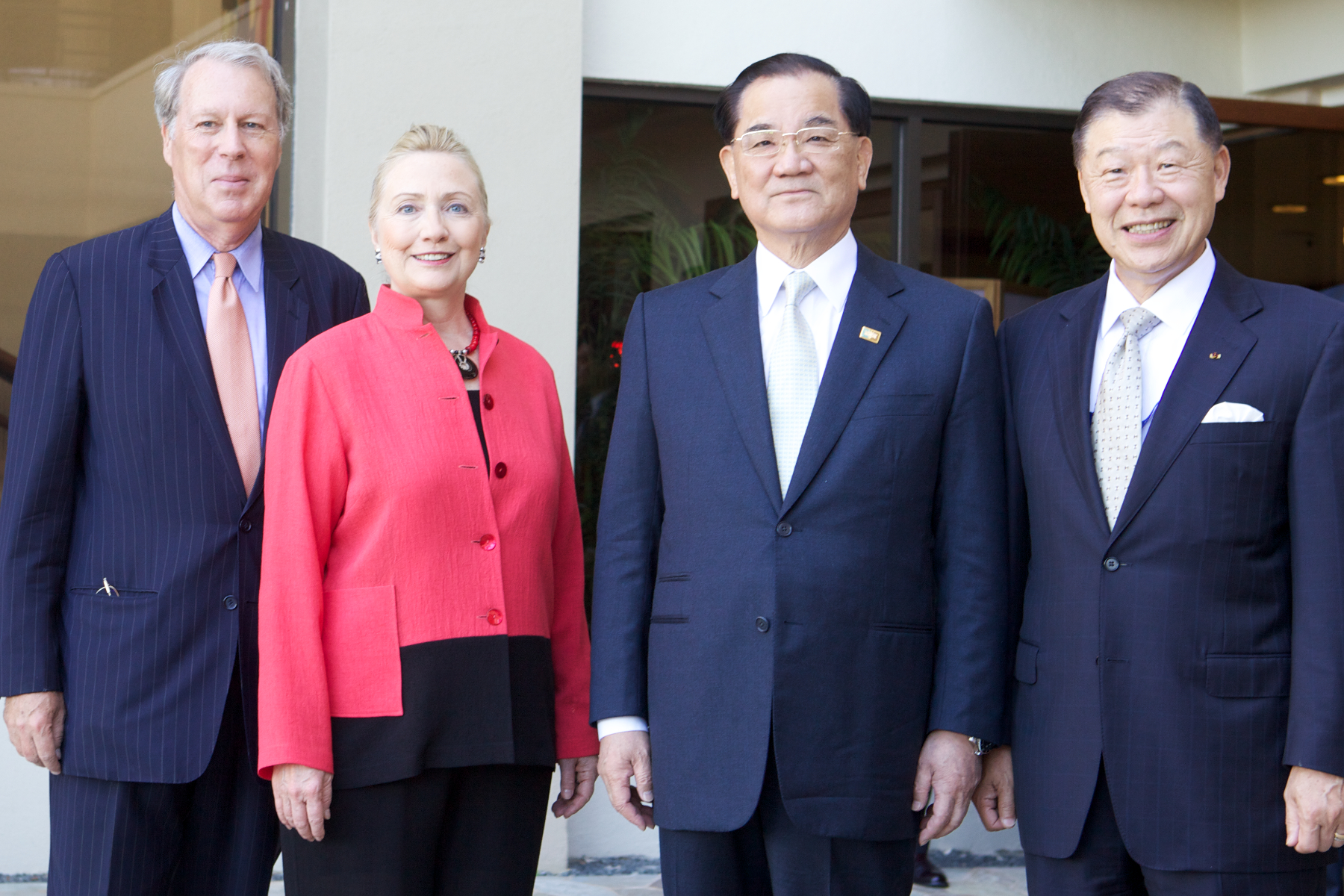
US Secretary of State Hillary Clinton and Taiwan's special envoy to the APEC summit, former Vice President Lien Chan, November 2011

U.S. commercial ties with Taiwan have been maintained and have expanded since 1979. Taiwan continues to enjoy Export-Import Bank financing, Overseas Private Investment Corporation guarantees, normal trade relations (NTR) status, and ready access to U.S. markets. In recent years, the American Institute in Taiwan commercial dealings with Taiwan have focused on expanding market access for American goods and services. The American Institute has been engaged in a series of trade discussions, which have focused on copyright concerns and market access for U.S. goods and services.

On 19 June 2013, the Taiwanese foreign ministry expressed gratitude for a US Congress's bill in support of Taiwan's bid to participate in the International Civil Aviation Organization (ICAO). On July 12, 2013, US President Barack Obama signed into law H.R. 1151, codifying the US government's full support for Taiwan's participation in the ICAO as a non-sovereign entity. The United States has continued the sale of appropriate defensive military equipment to Taiwan in accordance with the Taiwan Relations Act, which provides for such sales and which declares that peace and stability in the area are in U.S. interests. Sales of defensive military equipment are also consistent with the 1982 U.S.-P.R.C. Joint Communiqué.

On December 16, 2015, the Obama administration announced a deal to sell $1.83 billion worth of arms to the Armed Forces of Taiwan, a year and eight months after U.S. House passed the Taiwan Relations Act Affirmation and Naval Vessel Transfer Act of 2014 to allow the sale of Oliver Hazard Perry-class frigates to Taiwan. The deal would include the sale of two decommissioned U.S. Navy frigates, anti-tank missiles, Assault Amphibious Vehicles, and FIM-92 Stinger surface-to-air missiles, amid the territorial disputes in the South China Sea. PRC foreign ministry had expressed its disapproval for the sales and issued the U.S. a "stern warning", saying it would hurt China–U.S. relations.

On December 2, 2016, U.S. President-Elect Donald Trump accepted a congratulatory call from Taiwanese President Tsai Ing-Wen, which was the first time since 1979 that a President-Elect has publicly spoken to a leader of Taiwan. Donald Trump stated the call was regarding "the close economic, political and security ties between Taiwan and the US". The phone call had been arranged by Bob Dole, who acted as a foreign agent on behalf of Taiwan.

In June 2017, the Trump administration approved $1.4 billion arms sales to Taiwan. On 16 March 2018, President Trump signed the Taiwan Travel Act, allowing high-level diplomatic engagement between Taiwanese and American officials, and encourages visits between government officials of the United States and Taiwan at all levels. The legislation has sparked outrage from the PRC, and has been applauded by Taiwan.

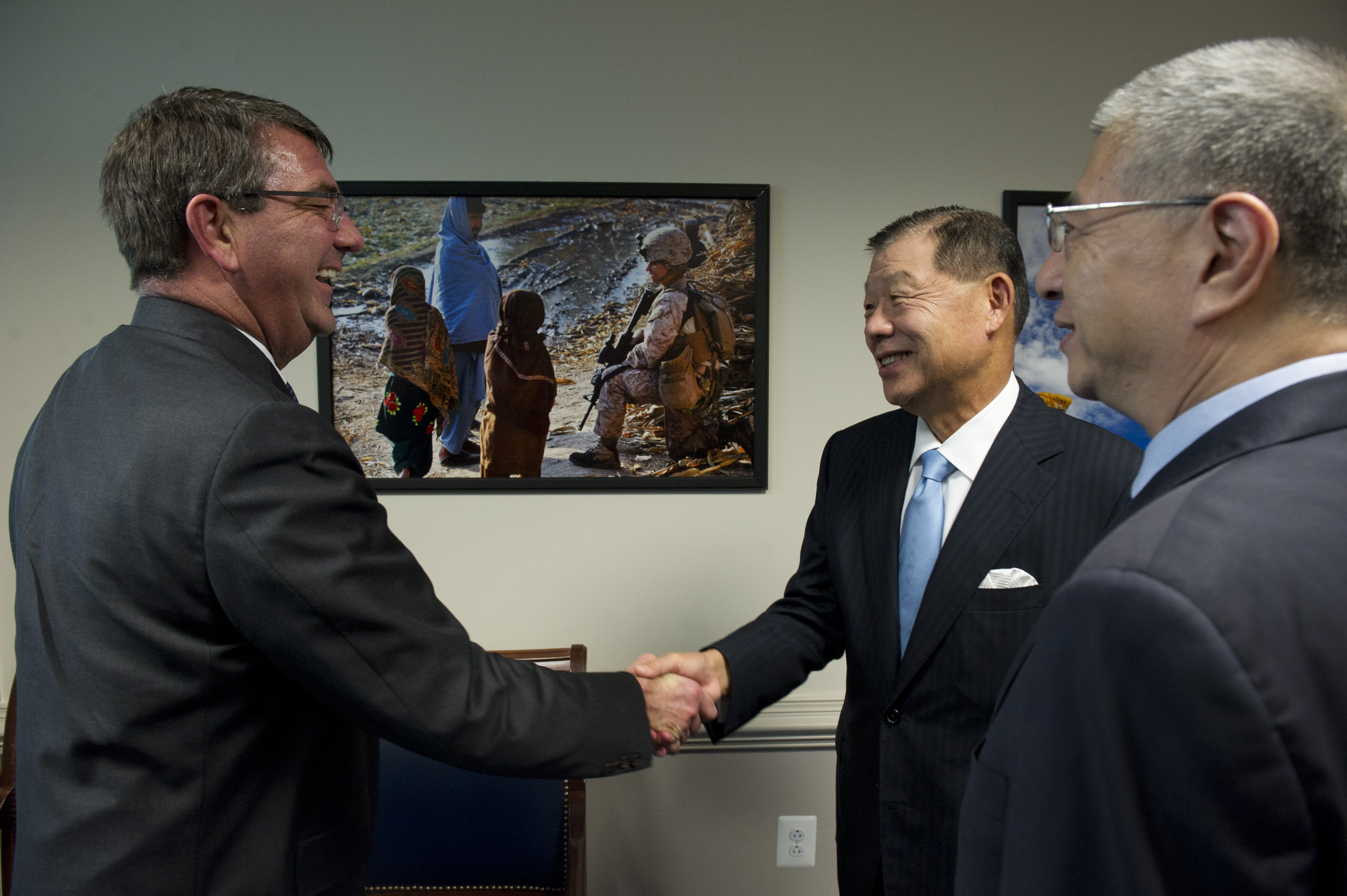
U.S. Deputy Secretary of Defense Ash Carter greets Taiwan's representative to the U.S. Jason Yuan and Deputy Minister of National Defense Andrew Yang before a meeting at The Pentagon on October 2, 2012

A new $250 million compound for the American Institute in Taiwan was unveiled in June 2018, accompanied by a "low-key" American delegation. The Chinese authorities described this action as violation of its "one China" policy statement and called on the US to stop any relations with Taiwan.

On 17 July 2018, Taiwan's Army officially commissioned all of its Apache attack helicopters purchased from the United States, at cost of $59.31 billion NT(US$1.94 billion), having completed the necessary pilot training and verification of the fleet's combat capability. One of the helicopters was destroyed in a crash during a training flight in Taoyuan in April 2014 and the other 29 have been allocated to the command's 601st Brigade, which is based in Longtan, Taoyuan. Taiwanese President Tsai Ing-wen said the commissioning of the Apaches was "an important milestone" in meeting the island's "multiple deterrence" strategy to counter an invasion and to resist Beijing's pressure with support from Washington, which has been concerned about Beijing's growing military expansion in the South China Sea and beyond.

In September 2018, the United States approved the sale of $330 million worth of spare parts and other equipment to sustain the Republic of China Air Force. In July 2019, the US State Department approved the sale of M1A2T Abrams tanks, Stinger missiles and related equipment at an approximate value of $2.2 billion to Taiwan.

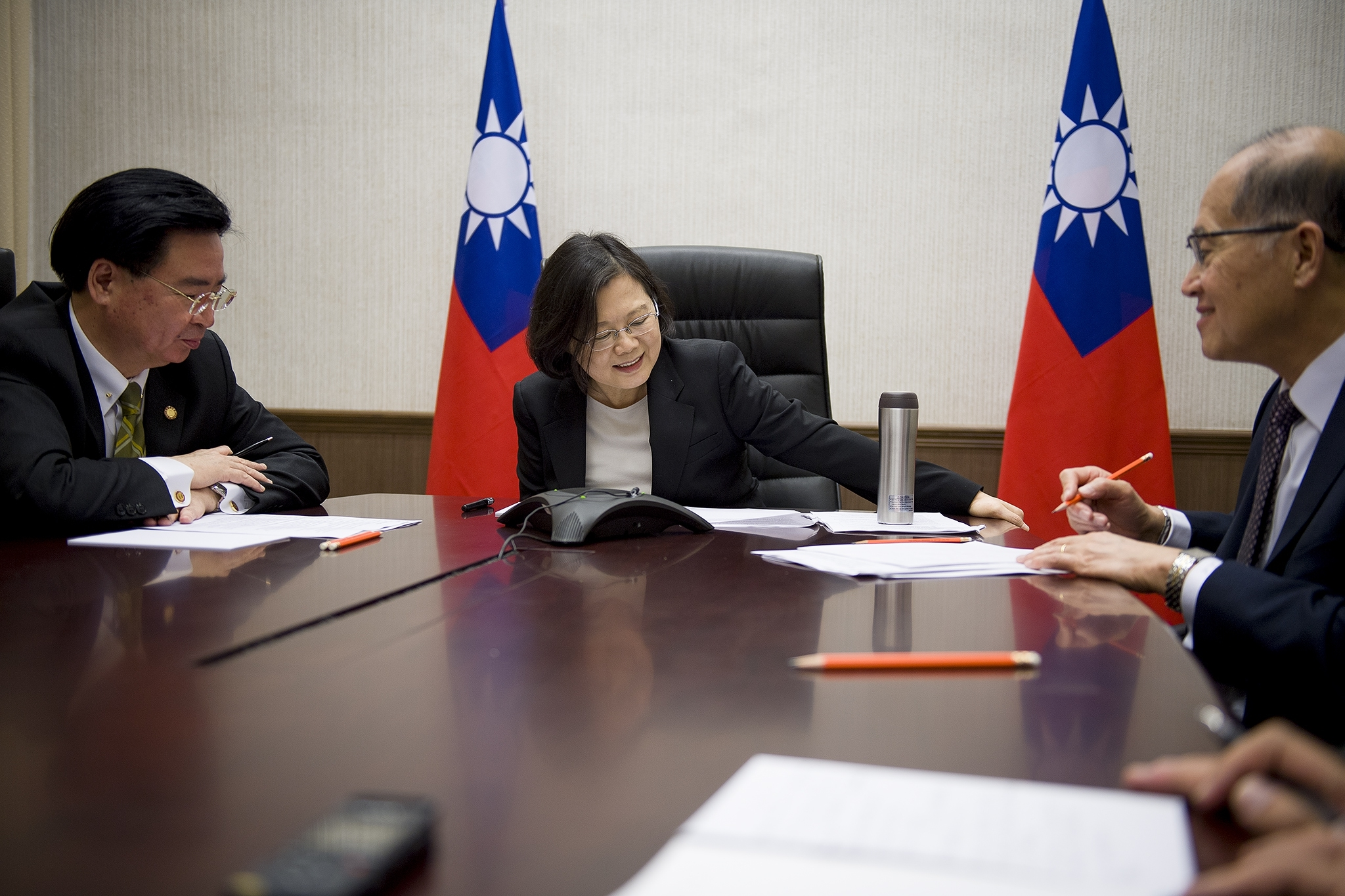
Tsai Ing-wen (center), President of the Republic of China (Taiwan), accompanied by Secretary-General of National Security Council Joseph Wu (left) and Foreign Minister David Lee (right), made a phone call to Donald Trump, President-elect of the United States, on December 2, 2016.

==== 2020s ====
On 26 March 2020, President Trump signed the TAIPEI Act, aiming to increase the scope of US relations with Taiwan and encouraging other nations and international organizations to strengthen their official and unofficial ties with the island nation. In May 2020, the US State Department approved a possible Foreign Military Sale of 18 MK-48 Mod 6 Advanced Technology Heavy Weight Torpedoes for Taiwan in a deal estimated to cost $180 million.

On 9 August 2020, U.S. Health and Human Services Secretary Alex Azar visited Taiwan to meet President Tsai Ing-wen, the first visit by an American official since the break in diplomatic relations between Washington and Taipei in 1979. In September 2020, U.S. Under Secretary of State for Economic Growth, Energy, and the Environment Keith J. Krach attended the memorial service for former Taiwanese President Lee Teng-hui.

In September 2020, the US Ambassador to the United Nations Kelly Craft met with Amb. James K.J. Lee, Director-General of the Taipei Economic and Cultural Office in New York, who was secretary-general in Taiwan's Ministry of Foreign Affairs until July, for lunch in New York City in what was the first meeting between a top Taiwan official and a United States ambassador to the United Nations. Craft said she and Lee discussed ways the US can help Taiwan become more engaged within the U.N., and she pointed to a December 2019 email alert from Taiwan that WHO had ignored, recognizing and warning about the danger of the person-to-person transmission of the new highly contagious COVID-19 virus in China.

In an October 2020 deal of $2.37 billion between the U.S. and Taiwan, the U.S. State Department approved the potential sale to Taiwan of 400 Harpoon anti-ship cruise missiles including associated radars, road-mobile launchers, and technical support.

In January 2021, Taiwan's President Tsai Ing-wen met with United States Ambassador to the UN Kelly Craft by video link. Craft said: "We discussed the many ways Taiwan is a model for the world, as demonstrated by its success in fighting COVID-19 and all that Taiwan has to offer in the fields of health, technology and cutting-edge science.... the U.S. stands with Taiwan and always will." Speaking in Beijing, PRC Ministry of Foreign Affairs spokesman Zhao Lijian said: "Certain U.S. politicians will pay a heavy price for their wrong words and deeds." On her last day in office later that month, Craft called Taiwan "a force for good on the global stage -- a vibrant democracy, a generous humanitarian actor, a responsible actor in the global health community, and a vigorous promoter and defender of human rights."

In 2021 and 2022, U.S. President Joe Biden made various forceful comments about coming to Taiwan's military defense in the event of a PRC invasion, indicating what scholars called a potential shift to "strategic clarity," while the State Department reiterated that the administration's Taiwan policy remained unchanged.

On March 3, 2021, the Biden administration reasserted the strength of the relationship between the U.S. and Taiwan in the administration's Interim National Security Strategic Guidance. On March 8, 2021, the Biden administration made the following statement during a press briefing: "We will stand with friends and allies to advance our shared prosperity, security, and values in the Indo-Pacific region. We maintain our longstanding commitments, as outlined in the Three Communiqués, the Taiwan Relations Act, and the Six Assurances. And we will continue to assist Taiwan in maintaining a sufficient self-defense capability."

In June 2021 a congressional delegation made up of Tammy Duckworth, Dan Sullivan and Christopher Coons briefly visited Taiwan and met with President Tsai Ing-wen. Their use of a C-17 military cargo aircraft drew strong protest from China. In late October 2021, U.S. Secretary of State Antony Blinken called on all United Nations member states to support Taiwan's participation in the U.N. system. The comments came a day after the 50th anniversary of U.N. Resolution 2758, in which the People's Republic of China was designated as the representative of China at the U.N., while the Republic of China (R.O.C.) was expelled.

In December 2021, the U.S. invited Taiwan to the Summit for Democracy. On December 15, 2021, the US House of Representative and Senate have both passed the National Defense Authorization Act for Fiscal Year 2022, in which calls for the enhancements of the security of Taiwan, including inviting the Taiwanese navy to the 2022 Rim of the Pacific exercise in the face of "increasingly coercive and aggressive behavior" by China. President Joe Biden signed the act on December 27, 2021.

A reporter asked Biden if the United States would defend Taiwan if it were attacked. "Yes," the president answered. "That's the commitment we made," said Biden[…] — May 23, 2022

On May 23, 2022, President Biden, during his trip to Asia, vowed to defend Taiwan with US military in the case of an invasion by China. At the end of May Illinois Senator Tammy Duckworth led a congressional delegation to Taiwan. In late May 2022, the State Department restored a line on its fact sheet on US-Taiwan relations which it removed earlier in the month and stated it did not support Taiwanese independence. However, another line which was also removed in the earlier fact sheet that acknowledged China's sovereignty claims over Taiwan was not restored while a line that stated the U.S. would maintain its capacity to resist any efforts by China to undermine the security, sovereignty and prosperity of Taiwan in a manner that was consistent with the Taiwan Relations Act was added to the updated fact sheet.

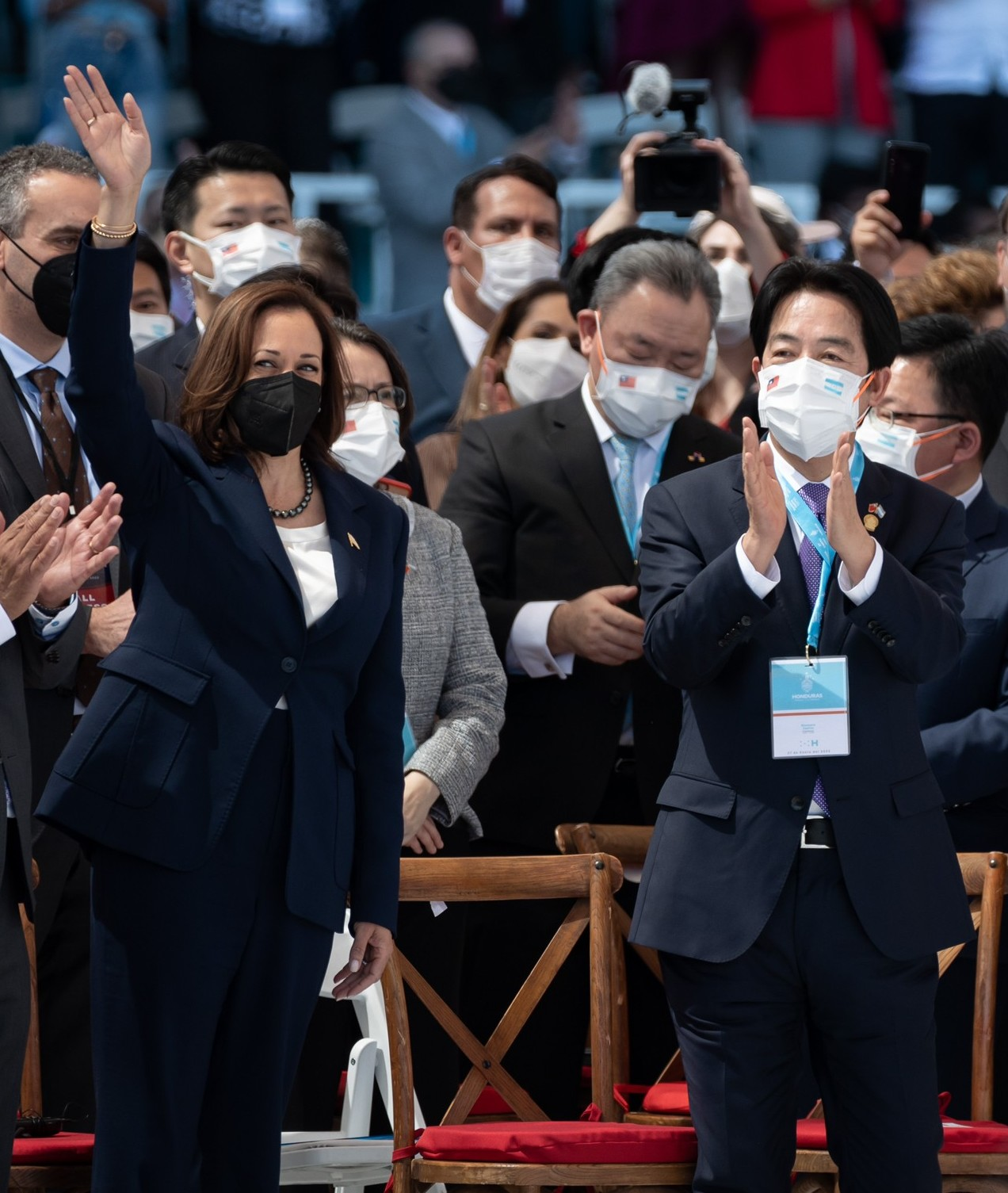
U.S. Vice President Kamala Harris with Vice President of Taiwan Lai Ching-te at the presidential inauguration of Xiomara Castro of Honduras in January 2022

On 27 January 2022, U.S. Vice President Kamala Harris and Vice President of Taiwan Lai Ching-te had a brief conversation during the presidential inauguration ceremony of Xiomara Castro of Honduras. On July 28, 2022, U.S. President Joe Biden had a phone call with CCP General Secretary Xi Jinping, during which he "underscored that the United States policy has not changed and that the United States strongly opposes unilateral efforts to change the status quo or undermine peace and stability across the Taiwan Strait." In July 2022 Senator Rick Scott led a congressional delegation to Taiwan.

On August 2, 2022, Nancy Pelosi, the Speaker of the United States House of Representatives led a congressional delegation to Taiwan, leading to a military and economic response from China. Later in August a congressional delegation led by Massachusetts Senator Ed Markey also visited Taiwan and Indiana Governor Eric Holcomb (who became the first Indiana Governor to visit Taiwan since 2005). In late August 2022 Tennessee Senator Marsha Blackburn visited Taiwan. In late August 2022 then Arizona Governor Doug Ducey arrived in Taiwan for a visit focused on semiconductors.

In February 2023, Representatives Ro Khanna, Jake Auchincloss, Jonathan Jackson and Tony Gonzales visited Taiwan. In March and April 2023, Tsai Ing-wen, President of Taiwan, traveled to the United States. In March, she met in New York City with House Minority Leader Hakeem Jeffries and a bipartisan group of U.S. Senators: Joni Ernst of Iowa, Mark Kelly of Arizona, and Dan Sullivan of Alaska.

On April 5, 2023, Tsai met with Kevin McCarthy, the Speaker of the U.S. House of Representatives, at the Ronald Reagan Presidential Library in Simi Valley, California and a bipartisan delegation of House members. The meeting between Tsai and McCarthy marked the first time a Taiwanese president had met with a US House speaker on American soil and the second time in less than a year that a Taiwanese president had met with a US House speaker (having met Pelosi in August 2022 in Taiwan). In June 2023, a US congressional delegation comprising nine representatives headed by Mike Rogers visited Taiwan.

On June 29, 2023, the State Department approved $440 million in arms sales to Taiwan, pending final approval by Congress. Beijing opposed the move, Chair of the American Institute in Taiwan Laura Rosenberger later stated that the US' "interest in peace and stability across the Strait and our commitments to supporting Taiwan's self-defense capacity are things we will continue to uphold, any complaints from Beijing are not going to change that approach." On July 28, 2023, the Biden administration formally announced a $345 million military assistance package to Taiwan. Both China and North Korea denounced the move. In September 2023 the Biden administration redirected military aid funding which had been appropriated to Egypt to Taiwan and Lebanon in response to a deteriorating human rights situation in Egypt.

In October 2023, Taiwan's vice defense minister Hsu Yen-pu urged the US to accelerate arms delivery at the US-Taiwan Defense Industry Conference in Virginia, a key exchange venue for top US and Taiwan defense officials that had been hosted annually since 2012. Some academics and retired Chinese military officers have claimed that Washington is trying to provoke Beijing to attack Taiwan by providing arms to them. CCP General Secretary Xi Jinping, told European Commission president Ursula von der Leyen that the US was trying to trick China into invading Taiwan, but that he would not take the bait. In November 2023 the US state of North Carolina opened an investment office in Taipei. On February 22, 2024, the State Department approved $75 million in weapons sale to Taiwan, the 13th such approval under the Biden administration. The announcement was made shortly prior to a bipartisan U.S. House Select Committee on China delegation led by Mike Gallagher arrived to Taiwan.

In May 2024, Raymond Greene was announced as the incoming American Institute in Taiwan director, effective summer 2024, succeeding Sandra Oudkirk. During Greene's first meeting with Taiwan President Lai Ching-te, he said the United States' longstanding policy on Taiwan is based on the US' "One China" policy. In a press release describing the meeting, Lai's office omitted the "one China" reference, and instead described Greene's remarks as having referenced "the longstanding U.S. policy." Lai's office denied it intentionally omitted the reference to the one China policy, which was challenged by local Taiwanese media.

"I'm not looking to have somebody go independent. And, you know, we're supposed to travel 9,500 miles to fight a war. I'm not looking for that. I want them to cool down. I want China to cool down," he [President Trump] told Fox News in an interview that aired on Friday. — May 19, 2026

President-elect Donald Trump has stated in late 2024 that he won't be committed to defending Taiwan if China invades Taiwan during his presidency. Trump has also suggested that Taiwan should pay the US for protecting it from China, referring to the relationship as insurance; especially after how the island 'took' the U.S. semiconductor business, said Trump. "You know, we're no different than an insurance company. Taiwan doesn't give us anything." In February 2025, the State Department removed a statement from its website stating that it does not support Taiwan independence. The website also added support for Taiwan's membership in international organizations. On May 5, 2025, the House of Representatives passed the bipartisan Taiwan International Solidarity Act, introduced by Democrat Congressman Gerald Connolly and Republican Congresswoman Young Kim. The Act condemns China from distorting the description of Taiwan in UN General Assembly Resolution 2758.

In June 2025, the US cancelled a trip by Taiwanese defense minister Wellington Koo to the Washington area to meet Under Secretary of Defense for Policy Elbridge Colby. In July 2025, the Trump administration denied President Lai Ching-te permission to stop in New York during a planned visit to Central America after the PRC objected to the US permitting the stopover. In August 2025, the Trump administration announced a 20% tariff on Taiwan.

In 2025 the American government sanctioned two Taiwanese companies, Mecatron Machinery Co Ltd and Joemars Machinery and Electric Industrial Co Ltd, for providing drone related goods and services to Iran.

In November 2025 a delegation of American legislators from New Hampshire, Maine, Massachusetts, Rhode Island, and Vermont visited Taiwan. In May 2026, US President Donald Trump announced he would have a discussion with Chinese leader Xi Jinping on the matter of arms sales to Taiwan, potentially breaking with the Six Assurances policy. On 21 September, the United States reaffirmed its defence commitments to Japan and South Korea and emphasized the importance of peace and stability across the Taiwan Strait. U.S., Japanese and South Korean officials also expressed support for Taiwan's meaningful participation in appropriate international organizations.

== Political status ==
In 1949, when Generalissimo Chiang Kai-shek's troops decamped to Taiwan at the end of the Chinese civil war, Washington continued to recognize Chiang's Republic of China Government as the government of all China.

The 1972 Shanghai Communiqué between the United States and the People's Republic of China (PRC) deeply troubled the Taiwanese government as the United States formally acknowledged that "all Chinese on either side of the Taiwan Strait maintain there is but one China" and with the American recognition of the PRC, threw Taiwanese–American relations into uncertainty.

In late 1978, Washington announced that it would break relations with the government in Taipei and formally recognize the People's Republic of China (PRC) as the "sole legal government of China."

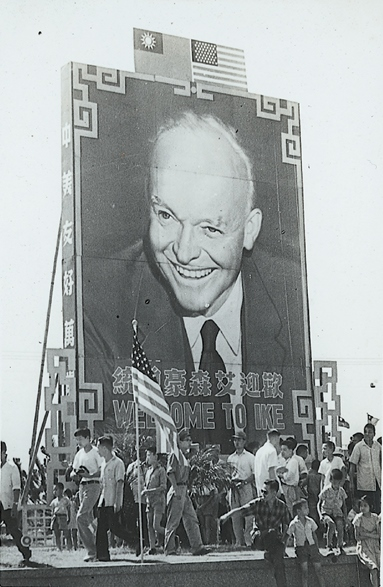
Taiwan welcomes U.S. President Dwight D. Eisenhower in 1960

Washington's "one China" policy, however, does not mean that the United States recognizes or agrees with Beijing's claims to sovereignty over Taiwan. On July 14, 1982, the Republican Reagan administration gave specific assurances to Taiwan that the United States did not accept China's claim to sovereignty over the island (Six Assurances), and the U.S. Department of State informed the Senate that "[t]he United States takes no position on the question of Taiwan's sovereignty."

The U.S. Department of State, in its U.S. Relations With Taiwan fact sheet, states "[T]he United States and Taiwan enjoy a robust unofficial relationship. The 1979 U.S.–P.R.C. Joint Communiqué switched diplomatic recognition from Taipei to Beijing. In the Joint Communiqué, the United States recognized the Government of the People's Republic of China as the sole legal government of China, acknowledging the Chinese position that there is but one China and Taiwan is part of China.

The United States position on Taiwan is reflected in "the six assurances to Taiwan", the Three Communiqués, and the Taiwan Relations Act. The Six Assurances are:

1. The United States has not agreed to set a date for ending arms sales to Taiwan;
2. The United States has not agreed to hold prior consultations with the Chinese on arms sales to Taiwan;
3. The United States would not play any mediation role between Taiwan and Beijing;
4. The United States has not agreed to revise the Taiwan Relations Act;
5. The United States has not altered its position regarding sovereignty over Taiwan; and
6. The United States would not exert pressure on Taiwan to enter into negotiations with the Chinese.

The "Three Communiqués" include The Shanghai Communiqué, The Normalisation Communiqué, and The August 17 Communiqué, which pledged to abrogate official US-ROC relations, remove US troops from Taiwan and gradually end the arms sale to Taiwan, but with the latter of no timeline to do so, an effort made by James Lilley, the Director of the American Institute in Taiwan.

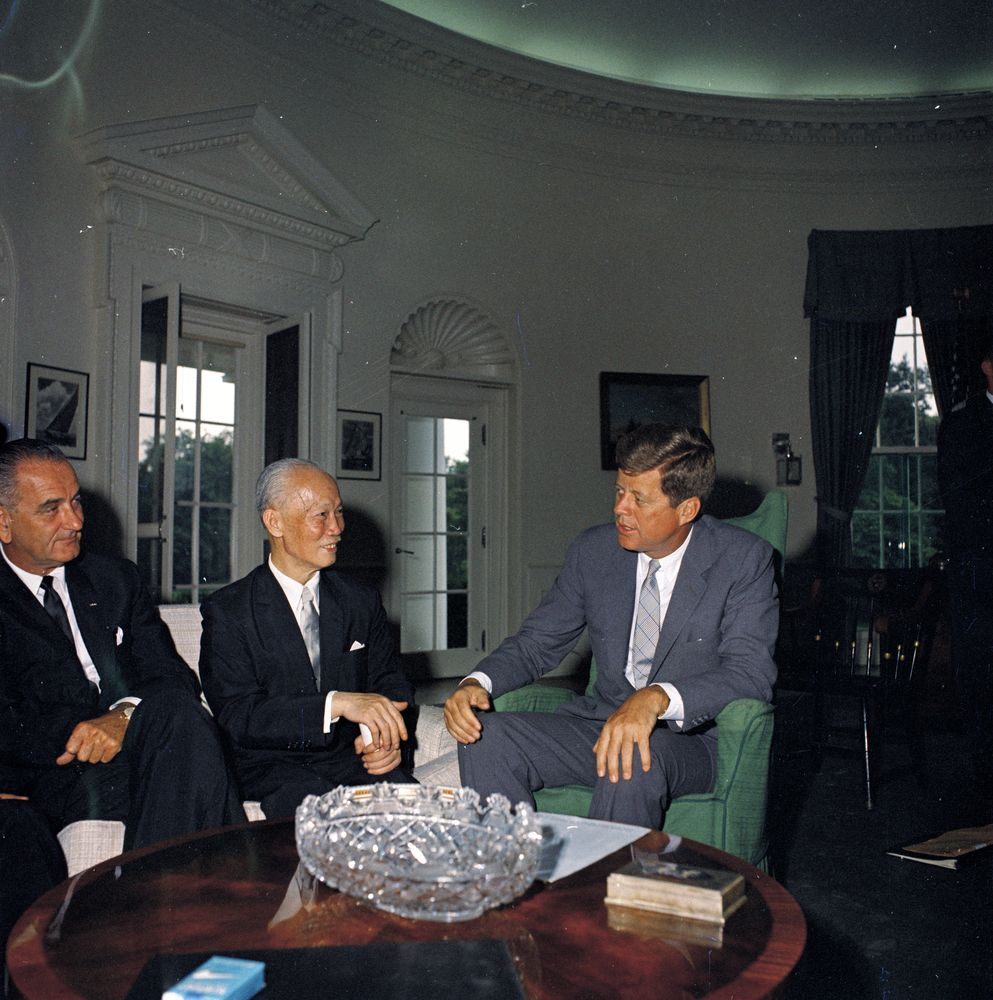
President John F. Kennedy and Vice President Lyndon Johnson meet with Chen Cheng, Vice President of the Republic of China, 31 July 1961

Maintaining diplomatic relations with the PRC has been recognized to be in the long-term interest of the United States by seven consecutive administrations; however, maintaining strong, unofficial relations with Taiwan is also a major U.S. goal, in line with its desire to further peace and stability in Asia. In keeping with its China policy, the U.S. does not support de jure Taiwan independence, but it does support Taiwan's membership in appropriate international organizations, such as the World Trade Organization, Asia-Pacific Economic Cooperation (APEC) forum, and the Asian Development Bank, where statehood is not a requirement for membership. In addition, the U.S. supports appropriate opportunities for Taiwan's voice to be heard in organizations where its membership is not possible.

== Intelligence and military cooperation ==
=== Before 1979 ===
The United States Taiwan Defense Command (USTDC; Chinese: 美軍協防台灣司令部) was a sub-unified command of the United States Armed Forces operating in Taiwan from December 1954 to April 1979.

=== After 1979 ===
==== Signals intelligence ====
Since the mid-1980s, the U.S. National Security Agency (NSA) and Taiwan's National Security Bureau have jointly operated a signals intelligence (SIGINT) listening station at Yangmingshan.

==== Joint training and arms purchases ====
Starting in 1997, Republic of China Air Force pilots began training at Luke Air Force Base in Arizona with the 21st Fighter Squadron after the country purchased its first batch of F-16 jets.

In 2007, Taiwan sold the US Department of Defense more than a billion rounds of rifle ammunition to replenish stocks depleted by the early years of the war on terror.

In 2019, the U.S. State Department approved a contract to train Taiwanese F-16 pilots at Luke Air Force Base. In 2020, Taiwanese pilots began to be trained at Morris Air National Guard Base with the 162nd Wing. In 2020, the U.S. Marine Raiders jointly trained with the Republic of China Marine Corps.

In 2021, former president Tsai Ing-wen stated in an interview that U.S. military personnel were in Taiwan engaged in joint training efforts. In 2022, the two countries entered into talks to co-produce weapons. In 2022, a squadron of Taiwanese F-16s was trained at Luke Air Force Base with the 21st Fighter Squadron.

In early 2024, it was reported that teams from 1st Special Forces Group would be continuously stationed with Taiwan's 101st Amphibious Reconnaissance Battalion and Airborne Special Service Company for joint training. Since at least 2021, Taiwanese troops have trained with American forces at Exercise Northern Strike in Michigan at Camp Grayling. In 2025, over 500 Taiwanese troops participated in Exercise Northern Strike.

In May 2024, the Republic of China Navy and the United States Navy conducted joint drills in the Western Pacific. In September 2024, the Financial Times reported that SEAL Team Six has conducted joint training with the Taiwanese military. In September 2024, Taiwan's first batch of Harpoon anti-ship missiles arrived in Kaohsiung. In December 2024, Taiwan received its first batch of M1 Abrams main battle tanks.

In January 2025, the two navies announced a two-year joint training program. In March 2025, Taiwan and the U.S. extended a program to train Taiwanese F-16 pilots in the U.S. By May 2025, about 500 U.S. military trainers were operating in Taiwan. In May 2025, Taiwan tested its first M142 HIMARS system. In August 2025, Taiwan's Ministry of National Defense announced that it would receive U.S.-made Mark 48 torpedoes. In September 2025, Taiwan's National Chung-Shan Institute of Science and Technology (NCSIST) announced it would jointly manufacture missiles with Anduril Industries. In October 2025, Taiwan's Ministry of Defense announced that it would increase reciprocal visits and observation of military exercises with the U.S. In November 2025, the U.S. announced the sale of fighter jet parts and a NASAMS to Taiwan. In December 2025, the U.S. approved a total arms sale of over $11 billion to Taiwan. The package is geared toward countering an amphibious invasion of Taiwan.

In January 2026, the U.S. and Taiwan agreed to jointly produce 155 mm caliber shells. In February 2026, NCSIST and Kratos Defense & Security Solutions tested a jointly-developed jet-powered attack drone.

In March 2026, Taiwan's parliament authorized the government to sign U.S. agreements for four arms sales packages. The same month, Taiwan began receiving MQ-9B SkyGuardian drones that it previously purchased. In April 2026, the U.S. and Taiwan announced a joint initiative to manufacture artillery shells such as 120×570mm NATO ammunition. In May 2026, Taiwan announced that HIMARS would be deployed to the outlying islands of Penghu and Dongyin. In June 2026, Taiwan's military publicly demonstrated robot "patrol dogs" developed with U.S. defense technology company Ghost Robotics for potential deployment on its outlying South China Sea Islands.

==== Satellite launches ====
Taiwanese satellites have relied on U.S. launch capabilities. Formosat-8 was launched from Vandenberg Space Force Base in 2025 as was Formosat-5 in 2017. The Taiwan Space Agency has also used SpaceX rockets for satellite launches.

== Trade ==
On May 18, 2023, the USTR announced that the US and Taiwan, "under the auspices of the American Institute in Taiwan and the Taipei Economic and Cultural Representative Office in the US, have concluded negotiations on the U.S.-Taiwan Initiative on 21st Century Trade." On August 7, 2023, President Biden signed into law the United States-Taiwan Initiative on 21st-Century Trade First Agreement Implementation Act.

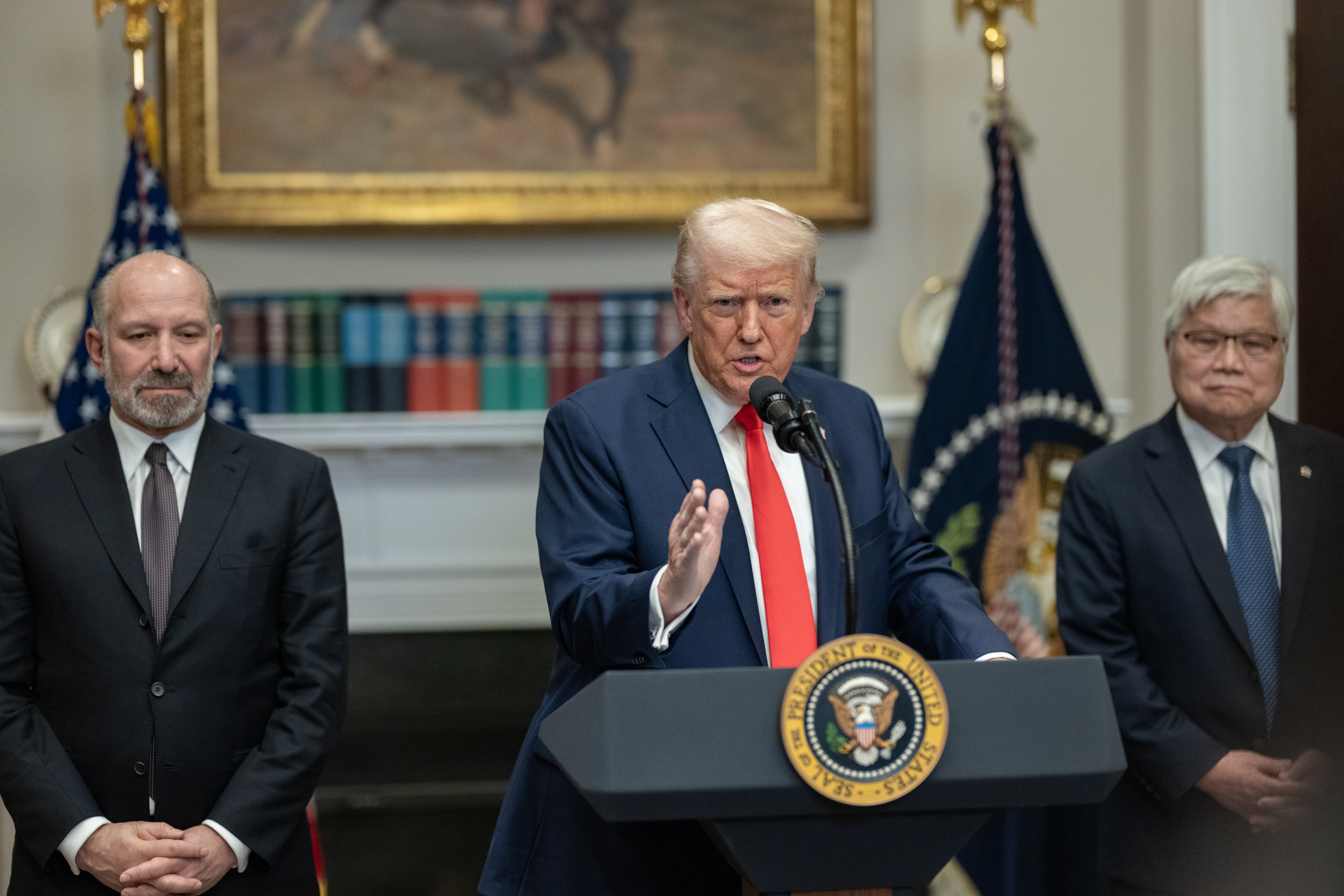
President Trump announced that TSMC is set to invest in the U.S..

On February 26, 2025, China accused Taiwan of using its semiconductor sector to gain political favor from the United States. U.S. President Donald Trump criticized Taiwan for its dominance in the U.S. semiconductor industry. Taiwan's government responded by emphasizing its commitment to preserving its position as a leader in semiconductor technology. In March 2025, President Lai Ching-te met with Alaska governor Mike Dunleavy in which it was announced that Taiwanese state-owned oil and gas company CPC Corporation would purchase six million tons of natural gas from the U.S. state. In October 2025, Tennessee governor Bill Lee signed a memorandum of understanding with Taiwan to expand economic cooperation.

In mid-January 2026, Taiwan and the United States signed a trade agreement for Taiwanese semiconductor and technology companies to invest US$250 billion in the US economy in return for the United States reducing its tariffs on Taiwanese exports from 20 to 15 percent.

=== Relations with states ===
In 2013, Taiwan and Nebraska signed an agricultural trade deal.

From 2020 to 2023, the number of U.S. state government offices in Taiwan more than doubled from six to 17.

In July 2024, Texas governor Greg Abbott signed an economic cooperation agreement between Texas and Taiwan and agreed to open a trade representative office in Taipei. As of 2025, 24 U.S. states and territories have representative offices in Taiwan. In October 2026, Kansas and Taiwan signed a memorandum of understanding to deepen trade ties.

== Public opinion ==
Public opinion in Taiwan regarding the United States is historically favorable and views the U.S. as a critical security guarantor against China. However, this is marked by significant ambivalence and skepticism regarding U.S. reliability, with many questioning if the U.S. would intervene in a conflict with China. According to the German Marshall Fund, Taiwanese skepticism of the United States is growing, driven by concerns that Washington is an unreliable partner that views Taiwan as a strategic pawn that can be potentially sacrificed to contain China. The anxiety is further fueled by the U.S. withdrawal from Afghanistan, the war in Ukraine and the transactional diplomacy under the Trump administration. There are also concerns including the U.S. onshoring of semiconductor manufacturing that could potentially weaken Taiwan's "silicon shield" and doubts about the American willingness to send ground troops, despite regular arms sales. The Kuomintang has also begun to adopt a dual strategy by working with the PRC and the CCP to reduce cross-straits tensions as a hedge against potential American uncertainty to defend Taiwan.

== Consular representation ==
The United States has a de facto embassy in Taipei called the American Institute in Taiwan. It also operates a de facto consulate in Kaohsiung called the Kaohsiung Branch Office of the American Institute in Taiwan.

Taiwan is represented by the Taipei Economic and Cultural Representative Office in Washington, D.C. This mission is also accredited to Cuba, the Bahamas, Grenada, Antigua and Barbuda, Dominica, and Trinidad and Tobago, despite Taiwan not having official relations with them. Other than the mission in Washington, Taiwan also has offices in Atlanta, Boston, Chicago, Honolulu, Houston, Miami, Los Angeles, New York, San Francisco, Seattle, Guam, and Denver.

== Country leadership ==
Leaders of Taiwan and the United States from 1950:

== See also ==
- China–United States relations
- Foreign relations of Taiwan
- Foreign relations of the United States
- List of U.S. arms sales to Taiwan
- Military Assistance Advisory Group
- Political status of Taiwan
- Twin Oaks (Washington, D.C.)
- United States beef imports in Taiwan
