= Taiwan Relations Act Affirmation and Naval Vessel Transfer Act of 2014 =

- Long title: To provide for the transfer of naval vessels to certain foreign countries, and for other purposes.
- Announced in: the 113th United States Congress
- Sponsored by: Rep. Edward R. Royce (R, CA-39)
- Number of co-sponsors: 1

Codification
- Acts affected: Arms Export Control Act, Foreign Assistance Act of 1961, International Emergency Economic Powers Act, Taiwan Relations Act
- U.S.C. sections affected: 22 U.S.C. § 2321j, 22 U.S.C. § 2778, 22 U.S.C. § 2776, 22 U.S.C. § 2761, 50 U.S.C. § 1701 et seq., and others.
- Agencies affected: Executive Office of the President, United States Department of State, United States Department of Commerce

Legislative history
- Introduced in the House as H.R. 3470 by Rep. Edward R. Royce (R, CA-39) on November 13, 2013; Committee consideration by United States House Committee on Foreign Affairs; Passed the House on April 7, 2014 (voice vote)

The Taiwan Relations Act Affirmation and Naval Vessel Transfer Act of 2014 (H.R. 3470) is a bill that would allow the sale of several Oliver Hazard Perry-class frigates to Mexico, Thailand, and Taiwan. Four naval vessels would be sold to Taiwan for about $10 million each. Mexico and Thailand would each receive two vessels as a grant.

The bill was introduced into the United States House of Representatives during the 113th United States Congress.

== Background ==
The Oliver Hazard Perry-class frigate is a class of frigates named after the American Commodore Oliver Hazard Perry, the hero of the naval Battle of Lake Erie. The warships were designed in the United States in the mid-1970s as general-purpose escort vessels inexpensive enough to be bought in large quantities to replace World War II-era destroyers and 1960s-era Knox-class frigates. Intended to protect amphibious landing forces, supply and replenishment groups, and merchant convoys from submarines, they also later were part of battleship-centric surface action groups and aircraft carrier battle groups/strike groups. Fifty-five ships were built in the United States: 51 for the United States Navy and four for the Royal Australian Navy (RAN). In addition, eight were built in the Republic of China (Taiwan), six in Spain, and two in Australia for their navies. Former U.S. Navy warships of this class have been sold or donated to the navies of Bahrain, Egypt, Poland, Pakistan, and Turkey.

The Taiwan Relations Act (Pub. L. 96–8, 93 Stat. 14, enacted April 10, 1979; H.R. 2479) is an act of the United States Congress that has defined the non-diplomatic relations between the United States and the residual Republic of China on Taiwan since the United States diplomatically recognized the People's Republic of China as "China". The law, passed in 1979, governs U.S.-Taiwan relations and opens up the possibility that the United States may offer Taiwan military assistance if Taiwan is ever attacked by China.

== Provisions of the bill ==
This summary is based largely on the summary provided by the Congressional Research Service, a public domain source.

The Taiwan Relations Act Affirmation and Naval Vessel Transfer Act of 2014 would authorize the President to transfer on a grant basis to Mexico, the Oliver Hazard Perry-class guided missile frigates Curts and McClusky; and (2) to Thailand, the Oliver Hazard Perry-class guided missile frigates Rentz and Vandegrift.

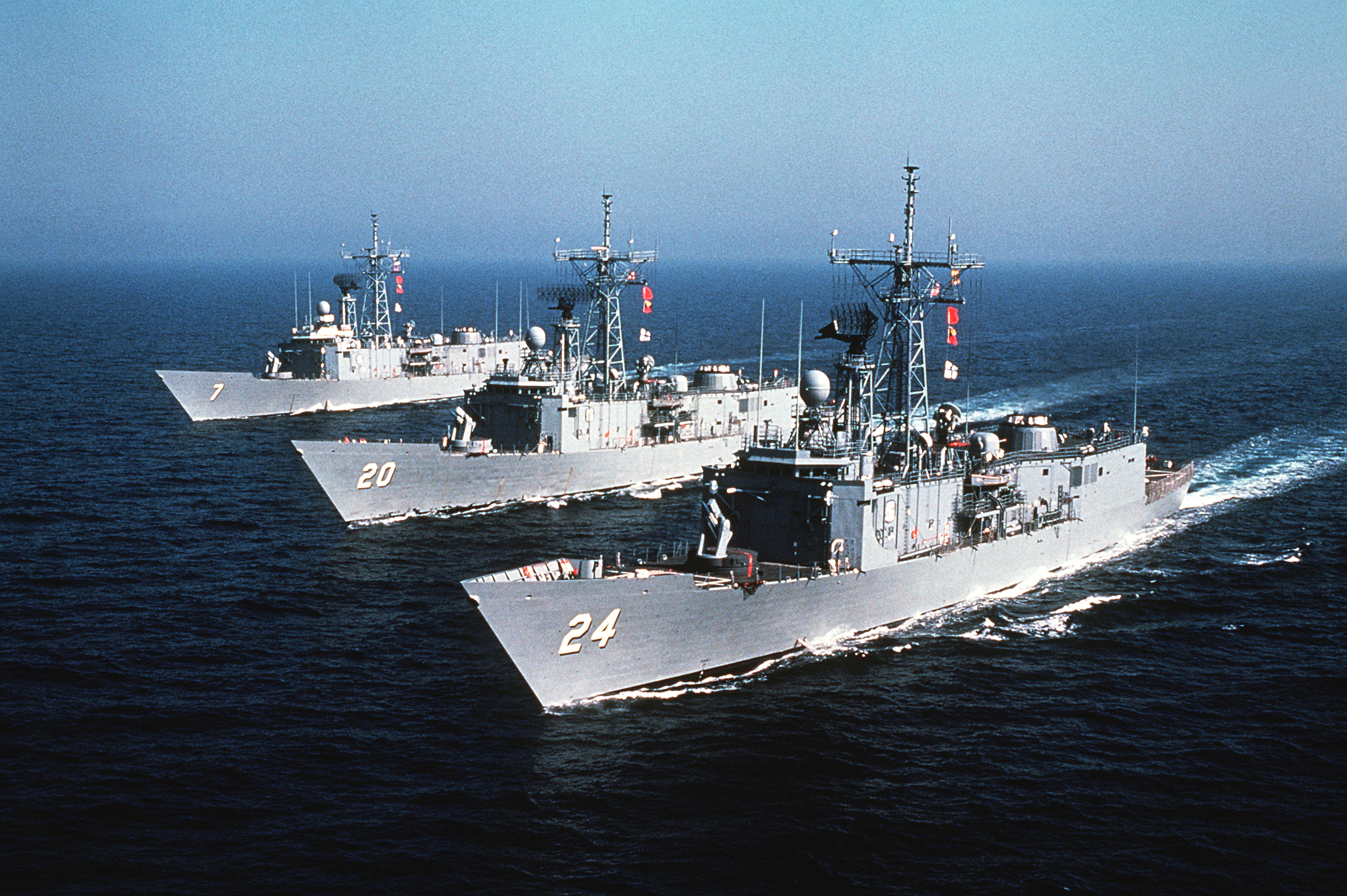
Oliver Hazard Perry-class frigates underway in 1982

The bill would authorize the President to transfer on a sale basis the Oliver Hazard Perry-class guided missile frigates Taylor, Gary, Carr, and Elrod to the Taipei Economic and Cultural Representative Office of the United States (which is the Taiwan instrumentality designated pursuant to the Taiwan Relations Act).

The bill would authorize the President, when transferring any vessel named in this Act, to ensure that the total number of vessels transferred to a country named in this Act does not exceed the total number authorized for transfer to that country.

The bills would state that: (1) the value of such vessels transferred on a grant basis shall not be counted against the aggregate value of excess defense articles transferred to countries in any fiscal year under the Foreign Assistance Act of 1961; (2) transfer costs shall be charged to the recipient; and (3) the country to which a vessel is transferred shall have necessary vessel repair and refurbishment carried out at U.S. shipyards (including U.S. Navy shipyards) to the maximum extent practicable.

The bill would terminate transfer authority three years after enactment of this Act.

The bill would amend the Arms Export Control Act to increase congressional notification thresholds for certain foreign military and commercial sales.

The bill would declare that: (1) a defense-related license or other approval from the United States Department of State may also authorize the export of items subject to the Export Administration Regulations if such items are to be used in or with defense articles controlled on the United States Munitions List; and (2) separate United States Department of Commerce approval shall not be required, but such items shall remain under Department of Commerce jurisdiction with respect to any subsequent transactions.

== Procedural history ==
The Naval Vessel Transfer and Arms Export Control Amendments Act of 2013 was introduced into the United States House of Representatives on November 13, 2013, by Rep. Edward R. Royce (R, CA-39). The bill was referred to the United States House Committee on Foreign Affairs. The bill was ordered to be reported by the committee on November 20, 2013, by unanimous consent. The bill's title was changed to the "Taiwan Relations Act Affirmation and Naval Vessel Transfer Act of 2014" on April 7, 2014, when the bill was passed by the House in a voice vote.

== Congressional Budget office report ==
This summary is based largely on the summary provided by the Congressional Budget Office, As ordered reported by the House Committee on Foreign Affairs on November 20, 2013. This is a public domain source.

H.R. 3470 would authorize the President to sell four naval vessels to Taiwan. The Congressional Budget Office (CBO) estimates that those sales would increase offsetting receipts (thus, reducing direct spending) by $40 million over the 2014-2024 period. Because enacting the bill would affect direct spending, pay-as-you-go procedures apply. Enacting the bill would not affect revenues, and implementing it would have insignificant effects on spending subject to appropriation.

Section 101 would authorize the sale of naval vessels. That authority would expire three years after the bill is enacted. Based on information from the United States Navy, the CBO estimates that all four vessels would be sold over that period, for about $10 million each. Those funds would be deposited in the Treasury as offsetting receipts. The bill also specifies vessels that may be transferred to certain nations by grant. Under the bill, any additional costs related to authorized sales or transfers, including costs for refurbishing the vessels, would be paid by the recipient countries. Such amounts are typically paid directly to the private shipyard that does the work.

H.R. 3470 contains no intergovernmental or private-sector mandates as defined in the Unfunded Mandates Reform Act and would impose no costs on state, local, or tribal governments.

On December 20, 2013, CBO published an estimate for S. 1683, the Naval Vessel Transfer Act of 2013, as reported by the United States Senate Committee on Foreign Relations on November 14, 2013, Section 102 of that bill is similar to section 101 of H.R. 3470, and estimated that both provisions would have the same budgetary effect.

== Debate and discussion ==
Rep. Ed Royce (R-CA) argued in favor of the bill saying that "these ships would bolster Taiwan's defense." Royce also said that "these transfers help support the priorities of the U.S. Navy while strengthening the capability of allies and our close partners to meet our share maritime security objectives."

Taiwanese newspaper The China Post reported that the Taiwanese military expected to receive two of the ships in 2015. The four ships that would be sold to Taiwan under this bill were all commissioned between 1984 and 1985. In addition to purchasing these ships to replace several older 1960s U.S.-built ships that Taiwan got from the U.S. in the 1990s, Taiwan is also thinking about building its own naval vessels.

== See also ==
- List of bills in the 113th United States Congress
