= Taiwan Relations Act =

United States legislation

- Long title: An act to help maintain peace, security, and stability in the Western Pacific and to promote the foreign policy of the United States by authorizing the continuation of commercial, cultural, and other relations between the people of the United States and the people on Taiwan, and for other purposes.
- Acronyms (colloquial): TRA
- Enacted by: the 96th United States Congress
- Effective: April 10, 1979

Citations
- Public law: Pub. L. 96–8
- Statutes at Large: 93 Stat. 14

Codification
- Titles amended: 22 U.S.C.: Foreign Relations and Intercourse
- U.S.C. sections created: 22 U.S.C. ch. 48 § 3301 et seq.

Legislative history
- Introduced in the House as "United States-Taiwan Relations Act" (H.R. 2479) by Clement J. Zablocki (D–WI) on February 28, 1979; Committee consideration by House Foreign Affairs; Passed the House on March 13, 1979 (345–55); Passed the Senate on March 14, 1979 (90–6); Reported by the joint conference committee on March 24, 1979; agreed to by the House on March 28, 1979 (339–50) and by the Senate on March 29, 1979 (85–4); Signed into law by President Jimmy Carter on April 10, 1979

The Taiwan Relations Act (TRA; Pub. L. 96–8, H.R. 2479, 93 Stat. 14, enacted April 10, 1979) is a United States law that outlines how the U.S. maintains unofficial ties with Taiwan after recognizing the People's Republic of China as the sole legal government of China in 1979. Enacted on April 10, 1979, the law allows the U.S. to continue economic, cultural, and security relations with Taiwan. It also permits arms sales to help Taiwan maintain its self-defense and states that any non-peaceful effort to decide Taiwan's future would be a serious concern for the United States. The Act remains a key part of U.S. policy toward Taiwan.

== Background ==
At The Third Plenum in 1978, Deng Xiaoping became the paramount leader of the People's Republic of China (PRC), definitively ending Maoist rule and beginning the reform era of Chinese history. During his speech at the plenum, he outlined a new Chinese foreign policy, whereby the Soviet Union—not the United States, as in the past—was identified as the main national security threat to China. During this time, China regarded itself as in a "united front" with the U.S., Japan, and western Europe against the Soviets. and thus established relations with the United States, China also supported American Operation Cyclone actions in Communist Afghanistan and leveled a military expedition against Vietnam, America's main antagonist in Southeast Asia. In exchange, the United States abrogated its mutual defense treaty (SAMDT) with the Republic of China (ROC).

The ROC government mobilized the China Lobby in the United States to lobby Congress for the swift passage of an American security guarantee for the island. Taiwan could appeal to members of Congress on many fronts: anti-communist China sentiment, a shared wartime history with the ROC, Beijing's human rights violations (despite committing violations of its own) and its curtailment of religious freedoms.

Senator Barry Goldwater and other members of the United States Congress challenged the right of President Jimmy Carter to cancel SAMDT unilaterally, which the US had signed with the ROC in December 1954 and was ratified by the U.S. Senate in February 1955. Goldwater and his co-filers of the US Supreme Court case Goldwater v. Carter argued that the President required Senate approval to take such an action of termination, under Article II, Section II of the U.S. Constitution, and that by not doing so, President Carter had acted beyond the powers of his office. The case ultimately was dismissed as non-justiciable and left open the constitutional question regarding a president's authority to dismiss a treaty unilaterally.

The Act was passed by both chambers of Congress and signed by President Carter in 1979 after the breaking of relations between the US and the ROC. Congress rejected the U.S. State Department's proposed draft and replaced it with language that has remained in effect since 1979. The TRA is intended to maintain commercial, cultural, and other relations through the unofficial relations in the form of a nonprofit corporation incorporated under the laws of the District of Columbia, the American Institute in Taiwan (AIT), without official government representation or formal diplomatic relations. The Act entered retroactively into force, effective January 1, 1979.

== Provisions ==
=== Definition of Taiwan ===
The act does not recognize the terminology of "Republic of China" after 1 January 1979, but uses the terminology of "governing authorities on Taiwan". Geographically speaking and following the similar content in the earlier defense treaty from 1955, it defines the term "Taiwan" to include, as the context may require, the island of Taiwan (the main Island) and the Pescadores (Penghu). Of the other islands or archipelagos under the control of the Republic of China, Kinmen, the Matsus, etc., are left outside the definition of Taiwan.

=== De facto diplomatic relations ===
The act authorizes de facto diplomatic relations with the governing authorities by giving special powers to the AIT to the level that it is the de facto embassy, and states that any international agreements made between the ROC and U.S. before 1979 are still valid unless otherwise terminated. One agreement that was unilaterally terminated by President Jimmy Carter upon the establishment of relations with the PRC was the Sino-American Mutual Defense Treaty.

The TRA provides for Taiwan to be treated under U.S. laws the same as "foreign countries, nations, states, governments, or similar entities", thus treating Taiwan as a sub-sovereign foreign state equivalent. The act provides that for most practical purposes of the U.S. government, the absence of diplomatic relations and recognition will have no effect.

=== Military provisions ===
The TRA does not guarantee or relinquish the U.S. intervening militarily if the PRC attacks or invades Taiwan, as its primary purpose is to ensure that the Taiwan policy will not be changed unilaterally by the U.S. president and ensure any decision to defend Taiwan will be made with the consent of the Congress. The act states that "the United States will make available to Taiwan such defense articles and defense services in such quantity as may be necessary to enable Taiwan to maintain a sufficient self-defense capability" and "shall maintain the capacity of the United States to resist any resort to force or other forms of coercion that would jeopardize the security, or social or economic system, of the people on Taiwan". However, the decision about the nature and quantity of defense services that America will provide to Taiwan is to be determined by the President and Congress. America's policy has been called "strategic ambiguity," and it is designed to dissuade Taiwan from a unilateral declaration of independence, and to dissuade the PRC from unilaterally unifying Taiwan with the PRC.

The TRA further stipulates that the United States will "consider any effort to determine the future of Taiwan by other than peaceful means, including by boycotts or embargoes, a threat to the peace and security of the Western Pacific area and of grave concern to the United States".

The TRA requires the United States to have a policy "to provide Taiwan with arms of a defensive character" and "to maintain the capacity of the United States to resist any resort to force or other forms of coercion that would jeopardize the security, or the social or economic system, of the people on Taiwan".

Successive U.S. administrations have sold arms to Taiwan despite demands from the PRC that the U.S. follow Three Joint Communiqués and the U.S. government's proclaimed One-China policy.

== Reaction and reaffirmation ==
The TRA's passage caused Chinese leader Deng Xiaoping to begin viewing the United States as an insincere partner willing to abandon its previous commitments to China.

The People's Republic of China considers the TRA to be "illegal and invalid". On 10 April 2024, Zhu Fenglian, the spokesperson of the Taiwan Affairs Office, said that "the so-called "Taiwan Relations Act" seriously violates the one-China principle and the provisions of the three Sino-US joint communiques, and it grossly interferes with China's internal affairs".

=== Reagan administration ===
The PRC aligned itself with the Third World countries rather than with the United States or the Soviet Union, engaging itself in various movements such as nuclear non-proliferation that would allow it to critique the superpowers. In the August 17th communique of 1982, the United States agreed to reduce arms sales to Taiwan. However, it also declared that it would not formally recognize PRC's sovereignty over Taiwan, as part of the Reagan administration's Six Assurances offered to Taipei in 1982.

=== Clinton administration ===
In the late 1990s, the United States Congress passed a non-binding resolution stating that relations between Taiwan and the United States will be honored through the TRA first. This resolution, which puts greater weight on the TRA's value over that of the three communiques, was signed by President Bill Clinton. Both chambers of Congress have repeatedly reaffirmed the importance of the TRA.

=== Since 2000 ===
A July 2007 Congressional Research Service Report confirmed that U.S. policy has not recognized the PRC's sovereignty over Taiwan. The PRC continues to view the TRA as "an unwarranted intrusion by the United States into the internal affairs of China". The United States has continued to supply Taiwan with armaments and China has continued to protest.

==== Bipartisan affirmation (2016) ====
On 19 May 2016, one day before Tsai Ing-wen assumed the democratically elected presidency of the Republic of China, former U.S. Senators Marco Rubio (R-FL), a member of the Senate Foreign Relations Committee and Senate Select Committee on Intelligence and Bob Menendez (D-NJ), former chair of the Senate Foreign Relations Committee and co-chair of the Senate Taiwan Caucus, introduced a concurrent resolution reaffirming the TRA and the "Six Assurances" as cornerstones of United States–Taiwan relations.

== See also ==
- American defense of Taiwan
- Foreign relations of Taiwan
- Political status of Taiwan
- TAIPEI Act
- Taiwan Relations Act Affirmation and Naval Vessel Transfer Act of 2014
- Taiwan Travel Act (2018)
