= Senate Taiwan Caucus =

United States congressional caucus

The United States Senate Taiwan Caucus is a bipartisan congressional member organization focusing exclusively on American-Taiwanese relations. It has 31 members in the 119th congress. Its counterpart in the House is the Congressional Taiwan Caucus.

== History ==
The caucus was established on September 17, 2003. Founding members of the caucus are: Senators George Allen (R-VA), Tim Johnson (D-SD), Byron Dorgan (D-ND), Dick Durbin (D-IL), Ben Nelson (D-NE), Jay Rockefeller (D-WV), Kit Bond (R-MO), Jon Kyl (R-AZ), Jeff Sessions (R-AL), Saxby Chambliss (R-GA) and Jim Inhofe (R-OK). By November 2003 the caucus had 18 members, including Tom Daschle and Trent Lott. The Senate Taiwan caucus had 24 members in 2011, and was active in applying pressure to uphold Taiwanese interests during Hu Jintao's visit to the US in that year.

== Members ==
This is the list of members as of 2026. 18 of the 30 members are Republicans, and 12 are Democrats.

- Thomas Tillis (co-chair) (R-NC)
- Elissa Slotkin (co-chair) (D-MI)
- John Boozman (R-AR)
- Ted Budd (R-NC)
- Shelley Moore Capito (R-WV)
- Bill Cassidy (R-LA)
- Susan Collins (R-ME)
- John Cornyn (R-TX)
- Tom Cotton (R-AR)
- Steve Daines (R-MT)
- Tammy Duckworth (D-IL)
- Dick Durbin (D-IL)
- Joni Ernst (R-IA)
- Chuck Grassley (R-IA)
- Josh Hawley (R-MO)
- Martin Heinrich (D-NM)
- James Lankford (R-OK)
- Edward Markey (D-MA)
- Jeff Merkley (D-OR)
- Jerry Moran (R-KS)
- Chris Murphy (D-CT)
- Gary Peters (D-MI)
- Mike Rounds (R-SD)
- Charles Schumer (D-NY)
- Tim Scott (R-SC)
- Jeanne Shaheen (D-NH)
- Dan Sullivan (R-AK)
- Chris Van Hollen (D-MD)
- Roger Wicker (R-MS)
- Ron Wyden (D-OR)
