= James R. Lilley =

American diplomat

Ambassador James R. Lilley
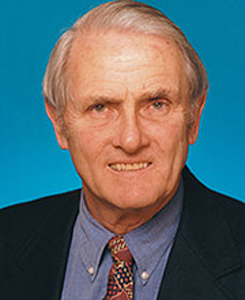

United States Ambassador to China
- In office May 8, 1989 – May 10, 1991
- President: George H. W. Bush
- Preceded by: Winston Lord
- Succeeded by: J. Stapleton Roy

United States Ambassador to South Korea
- In office November 26, 1986 – January 3, 1989
- President: Ronald Reagan
- Preceded by: Richard L. Walker
- Succeeded by: Donald Gregg

Personal details
- Born: January 15, 1928 Qingdao, Shandong, Republic of China
- Died: November 12, 2009 (aged 81) Washington, D.C., U.S.
- Spouse: Sally Booth
- Children: 3 sons
- Education: Yale University (BA); George Washington University (MA)
- Profession: Diplomat

Military service
- Allegiance: United States
- Branch/service: United States Army; United States Air Force
- Years of service: 1945–1946; 1951–1954
- Battles/wars: Korean War

James Roderick Lilley (simplified Chinese: 李洁明; traditional Chinese: 李潔明; pinyin: Lǐ Jiémíng; January 15, 1928 – November 12, 2009) was a CIA operative and an American diplomat. He served as United States ambassador to China from 1989 to 1991.

Born to American parents in China, Lilley learned Mandarin at a young age before his family moved back to the United States at the outbreak of World War II. He served in the United States Army before earning an undergraduate degree from Yale University and a master's in international relations from George Washington University. He then joined the Central Intelligence Agency, where he would work for nearly 30 years in a variety of Asian countries prior to becoming a diplomat.

Before being appointed ambassador to China in 1989, he was director of the American Institute in Taiwan, Washington's de facto embassy on the island, and ambassador to South Korea. After the suppression of the Tiananmen Square protests, Lilley was critical of the Chinese crackdown and harbored a prominent dissident in the embassy, but worked to prevent long-term damage to United States–China relations. After his retirement, he published a memoir and worked as a fellow at the American Enterprise Institute.

== Early life and education ==
James Lilley was born in Qingdao (Tsingtao) in coastal Shandong Province, Republic of China, to American expatriate parents. His father, an oil executive who had moved to China to work for Standard Oil in 1916, and his mother, a teacher, hired a Chinese nanny to help raise him. He spoke Mandarin fluently from a young age, in addition to French and English.

In prewar China, Lilley befriended and played catch with a Japanese soldier, but in 1940, soon after the outbreak of World War II, his family returned to the United States as fighting between Japanese and Chinese forces began to ravage the coastal regions of China. He attended Phillips Exeter Academy and served in the United States Army at Fort Dix from 1945 to 1946. During Lilley's army service, his older brother, whom he revered and who was a soldier stationed in Hiroshima, Japan, committed suicide.

After leaving the Army, Lilley earned a bachelor's degree from Yale University and a master's degree in international relations from George Washington University before studying classical Chinese at Hong Kong University and Columbia University. He began his career in government by joining the Central Intelligence Agency in 1951, at the beginning of the Cold War. In 1954, he married Sally Booth, with whom he had three sons.

== Career ==
As a CIA operative, Lilley worked in various parts of Asia, including Laos, Japan, Hong Kong, Taiwan and Mainland China. In Laos, he worked to undermine the communist side in the Laotian Civil War. and helped to insert a number of CIA agents into China. In 1975, he was appointed to the position of national intelligence officer for China, which made him the highest-ranked expert on China in the American intelligence community.

Early in the administration of President Ronald Reagan, he was appointed to the National Security Council, where he served as the senior expert on East Asia. From 1981 to 1984, he served as director of the American Institute in Taiwan, the United States' unofficial diplomatic liaison to the government of Taiwan. There, he resisted attempts by the State Department to end arms sales to Taiwan, which the department hoped would lead to better relations with China. Lilley's resistance resulted in a compromise in which the United States agreed to reduce arms sales to Taiwan but set no timeline for stopping them. The United States has continued the arms sales. Lilley delivered what came to be known as the Six Assurances to then-President Chiang Ching-kuo.

In 1985, Lilley became the deputy assistant secretary of state for East Asian affairs. In the private sector, he taught about China at the Johns Hopkins University School of Advanced International Studies and consulted for companies doing business in East Asia. In 1986, Reagan appointed him as the United States ambassador to South Korea, where he served until 1989. His tenure in South Korea coincided with profound political change there; the year after his arrival, the country held its first real presidential election in nearly two decades.

Lilley was appointed by President George H. W. Bush to be ambassador to China in 1989, the only American diplomat to head diplomatic missions in both mainland China and Taiwan. Bush and Lilley had a longstanding friendship that began in the early 1970s, when Lilley was the head of station for the CIA in Beijing, and Bush was the chief of mission. That personal relationship meant that Lilley often had the ear of the president on issues relating to China, and many of his missives home were read directly by Bush. To gain a better understanding of what was happening on the ground, Lilley began to bike regularly through the streets of Beijing soon after his arrival. Thus, he was familiar with the grievances of Chinese students who participated in the Tiananmen Square protests of 1989 and sympathized with their interest in a more open government and society. He criticized the Chinese government after the violent suppression of those protests, which garnered widespread international attention and condemnation. In addition, he harbored the political dissident Fang Lizhi inside the American embassy for 18 months before the Chinese government allowed Fang to enter exile in the United States.

Despite his sympathy with the students' cause, Lilley argued against severe actions by the United States government such as severing ties with China, as he believed that such actions would not have the intended effect. He also arranged for a secret trip by two senior United States officials to reassure the Chinese government that the United States wished to continue its relationship with China. He did so, he later said, out of a belief that the United States "could contribute in constructive ways to a more open China." Despite his criticism, he remained respected by authorities in China, many of whom turned out at farewell parties when Lilley left China and retired from the diplomatic corps in 1991. His successor argued that Lilley's childhood familiarity with Chinese society had given him a unique perspective on Chinese culture and government.

On November 5, 1991, President George H. W. Bush nominated Lilley to succeed Henry S. Rowen as the Assistant Secretary of Defense for International Security Affairs. On November 27, 1991, he appeared before the Senate Committee on Armed Services. His nomination was approved by both the committee and the full Senate that same day. Lilley served in his final government position from December 12, 1991 to January 20, 1993.

== Retirement and death ==
Following his retirement from government service, Lilley became a senior fellow at the American Enterprise Institute, focusing on East Asian relations, and continued writing and speaking about the relationship between the United States and China. In 2004, he published a memoir, China Hands, dedicated to his brother, which dealt with his early exposure to Asia and his professional career.

Lilley died at Sibley Hospital in Washington, D.C., from complications of prostate cancer.

Diplomatic posts
Preceded by Charles T. Cross	Director of the American Institute in Taiwan; 1981–1984	Succeeded by Harry E. T. Thayer
Preceded by Richard L. Walker	U.S. Ambassador to Korea; 1986–1989	Succeeded by Donald Gregg
Preceded by Winston Lord	U.S. Ambassador to China; 1989–1991	Succeeded by J. Stapleton Roy
