= List of vice presidents of the Republic of China by other offices held =

This is a list of vice presidents (post-1947 constitution) of the Republic of China by other offices (either elected or appointive) held, either before or after service as the vice president.

== Central government ==
=== Executive branch ===
==== Presidents ====
President	Year(s) served	Notes
Yen Chia-kan	1975–1978	Became president after Chiang Kai-shek's death
Lee Teng-hui	1988–2000	Became president after Chiang Ching-kuo's death

In addition, Li Zongren acted as president from 21 January 1949 to 1 March 1950 on Chiang Kai-shek's declaration of incapacity.

==== Executive Yuan Ministers ====
Minister	Office	President served under	Year(s) served
Chen Cheng	Premier	Chiang Kai-shek	1950–1954; 1958–1963
Chen Cheng	Minister of Council for United States Aid	Chiang Kai-shek	1950–1954; 1958–1963
Chen Cheng	Minister of Council for International Economic Cooperation and Development	Chiang Kai-shek	1963
Yen Chia-kan	Minister of Economic Affairs	Chiang Kai-shek	1950
Yen Chia-kan	Minister of Finance	Chiang Kai-shek	1950–1954
Yen Chia-kan	Minister of Council for United States Aid	Chiang Kai-shek	1957–1958
Yen Chia-kan	Minister of Council for International Economic Cooperation and Development	Chiang Kai-shek	1963–1969
Yen Chia-kan	Minister of Vocational Assistance Commission for Retired Servicemen	Chiang Kai-shek	1954–1956
Yen Chia-kan	Minister of Finance	Chiang Kai-shek	1958–1963
Lee Teng-hui	Minister Without Portfolio	Chiang Kai-shek; Yen Chia-kan	1972–1978
Lee Yuan-tsu	Minister of Education	Yen Chia-kan; Chiang Ching-kuo	1977–1978
Lee Yuan-tsu	Minister Without Portfolio	Yen Chia-kan; Chiang Ching-kuo	1977–1984
Lee Yuan-tsu	Minister of Justice	Yen Chia-kan; Chiang Ching-kuo	1978–1984
Lien Chan	Minister of National Youth Commission	Chiang Ching-kuo; Lee Teng-hui	1978–1981
Lien Chan	Minister of Transportation and Communications	Chiang Ching-kuo; Lee Teng-hui	1981–1987
Lien Chan	Minister Without Portfolio	Chiang Ching-kuo; Lee Teng-hui	1981–1990
Lien Chan	Vice Premier	Chiang Ching-kuo; Lee Teng-hui	1987–1988
Lien Chan	Minister of Foreign Affairs	Chiang Ching-kuo; Lee Teng-hui	1988–1990
Lien Chan	Premier	Chiang Ching-kuo; Lee Teng-hui	1993–1997
Vincent Siew	Minister of Economic Affairs	Lee Teng-hui	1990–1993
Vincent Siew	Minister of Council for Economic Planning and Development	Lee Teng-hui	1993–1994
Vincent Siew	Minister Without Portfolio	Lee Teng-hui	1993–1995
Vincent Siew	Minister of Mainland Affairs Council	Lee Teng-hui	1994–1995
Vincent Siew	Premier	Lee Teng-hui	1997–2000
Wu Den-yih	Premier	Ma Ying-jeou	2009–2012
Chen Chien-jen	Minister of Department of Health	Chen Shui-bian	2003–2005
Chen Chien-jen	Minister of National Science Council	Chen Shui-bian	2006–2008
Chen Chien-jen	Premier	Tsai Ing-wen	2023–
William Lai	Premier	Tsai Ing-wen	2017–2019

==== Ambassadors ====
Vice President	Position	President served under	Year(s) served	Notes
Lien Chan	Ambassador to El Salvador	Yen Chia-kan	1975–1976	
Hsiao Bi-khim	Representative to the United States	Tsai Ing-wen	2020-2023	

=== Parliament ===
==== National Assembly ====
Constituency	Vice President	Year(s) served	Notes
Tainan City	William Lai	1996–1999	

==== Legislative Yuan ====
Constituency	Vice President	Year(s) served	Notes
Chiayi City	Vincent Siew	1996–1997	Later appointed as premier
Hualien	Hsiao Bi-khim	2016–2020	
Nantou; Nantou 1	Wu Den-yih	2002–2009	Later appointed as premier
Tainan City; Tainan City 2	William Lai	1999–2010	Later elected as Mayor of Tainan
Taipei 1	Hsiao Bi-khim	2005–2008	
Taoyuan	Annette Lu	1993–1996	Later elected as Taoyuan County Magistrate
Party list (overseas Chinese); Party list	Hsiao Bi-khim	2002–2005; 2012–2016	

These future vice presidents served in the Legislative Yuan together:

- Wu Den-yih served with William Lai (2002–2009).
- Hsiao Bi-khim served with Wu Den-yih and William Lai (2002–2008).

== Local government ==
=== Governors and Mayors of Special Municipalities ===
Province / Special Municipality	Vice President	Year(s) served	Notes
Anhui	Li Zongren	1938	
Hubei	Chen Cheng	1940–1944	
Kaohsiung City	Wu Den-yih	1990–1998	
Tainan	William Lai	2010–2017	
Taipei	Lee Teng-hui	1978–1981	
Taiwan	Chen Cheng	1949	
Taiwan	Hsieh Tung-min	1972–1978	
Taiwan	Lee Teng-hui	1981–1984	
Taiwan	Lien Chan	1990–1993	

=== Provincial or City Councillors ===
Provincial/City Council	Vice President	Year(s)served	Notes
Taipei City Council	Wu Den-yih	1973–1981	
Taiwan Provincial Council	Hsieh Tung-min	1957–1972	Was Deputy Speaker 1957–1963, Speaker 1963–1972

=== Other provincial or municipal offices ===
Vice President	Office and Jurisdiction	Year(s) served
Yen Chia-kan	Commissioner, Department of Finance, Fukien Province	1939–1945
Yen Chia-kan	Commissioner, Department of Construction, Fukien Province	1947–1949
Hsieh Tung-min	Secretary General, Taiwan Provincial Government	1954–1957

=== Magistrates and Mayors of County-level Units ===
County/City	Vice President	Year(s) served	Notes
Xinhui, Guangdong	Li Zongren	1919	
Kaohsiung County, Taiwan Province	Hsieh Tung-min	1946–1947	
Taoyuan, Taiwan Province	Annette Lu	1997–2000	

== Military ==
Vice President	Term of office	Position(s)
Li Zongren	1948–1954	Full General in the Republic of China Army
Chen Cheng	1954–1965	Full General in the Republic of China Army

== Lost races ==
=== Presidential elections ===
Vice President	Office and jurisdiction	Year	Notes
Lien Chan	President of the Republic of China	2000; 2004	Lost both times to Chen Shui-bian.
Annette Lu	Democratic Progressive nomination for President of the Republic of China	2008	Lost to Frank Hsieh.
Annette Lu	Candidacy for President of the Republic of China	2020	Did not gather enough petitions.
Vincent Siew	Vice President of the Republic of China	2000	Lost to Annette Lu.
William Lai	Democratic Progressive nomination for President of the Republic of China	2020	Lost to Tsai Ing-wen. Later served as her running mate.

=== Legislative elections ===
Vice President	Constituency	Year	Notes
Hsiao Bi-khim	Democratic Progressive nomination for Taipei 2	2008	Lost to Wang Shih-chien.
Hsiao Bi-khim	Hualien	2010 by-election 2020	Lost to Wang Ting-son and Fu Kun-chi.

=== Local elections ===
Vice President	Office and jurisdiction	Year	Notes
Wu Den-yih	Mayor of Kaohsiung	1998	Lost to Frank Hsieh.
