= Chang Fu-hsing =

Taiwanese politician (1942–2003)

- 張福興
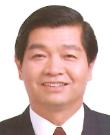

Magistrate of Hualien County
- In office 20 December 2001 – 18 May 2003
- Preceded by: Wang Ching-feng
- Succeeded by: Fan Kuang-chun (acting); Hsieh Shen-shan

Member of the Legislative Yuan
- In office 1 February 1999 – 20 December 2001
- Constituency: Hualien County

Personal details
- Born: 21 July 1942 Karenkō Prefecture, Taiwan, Empire of Japan
- Died: 18 May 2003 (aged 60) Taipei, Taiwan
- Party: Kuomintang
- Spouse: Liu Chao-a (劉詔娥)
- Education: Soochow University (LLB); Kindai University (LLM)
- Occupation: Politician

Chang Fu-hsing (Chinese: 張福興; pinyin: Zhāng Fúxìng; 21 July 1942 – 18 May 2003) was a Taiwanese politician who served as a member of the Legislative Yuan from 1999 to 2001 and as Hualien County magistrate from 2001 until his death in 2003.

== Education ==
Chang attended schools in his native Hualien before earning a bachelor's degree in law from Soochow University. He then furthered his legal education at Kindai University in Japan.

== Political career ==
Chang served in the Legislative Yuan from 1999 to 2001 when he was elected Hualien County magistrate with 59,591 votes in the local elections. He was a cofounder of the Taroko Gorge Marathon, which started in 2000.

=== Death and succession ===
Chang died of lung cancer on 18 May 2003 at Taipei Veterans General Hospital. He was married to Liu Chao-a (劉詔娥) until his death. Liu attempted to capture the Kuomintang nomination for her husband's position, but later mounted an independent election bid supported by the Democratic Progressive Party to succeed her husband in the early stages of a four-way race. She won neither party's endorsement and later dropped out of the race. Chang was succeeded by Hsieh Shen-shan, who won 73,710 votes in the by-election following Chang's death.
