= Anti-Money Laundering Office =

Anti-Money Laundering Office may refer to:

- Anti-Money Laundering Office (Thailand)
- Anti-Money Laundering Office, Executive Yuan

== See also ==
- AMLO (disambiguation)
