= Chen Yung-hsing =

Taiwanese psychiatrist and politician (born 1950)

Chen Yung-hsing MLY
- 陳永興
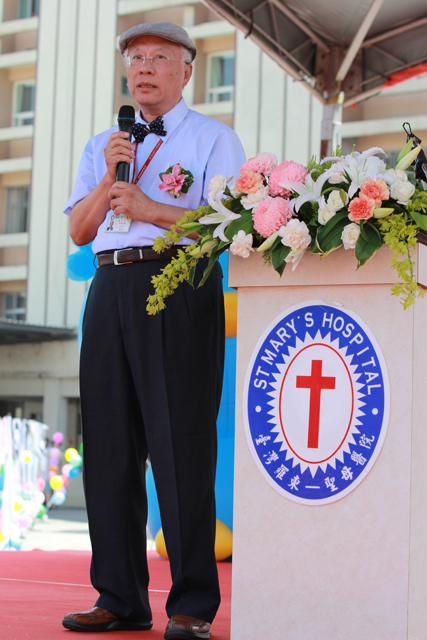
- Chen in July 2012

Member of the Legislative Yuan
- In office 1 February 1996 – 31 January 1999
- Constituency: Hualien County

Member of the National Assembly
- In office 1 February 1992 – 31 January 1996

Personal details
- Born: 12 August 1950 (age 76)
- Party: New Power Party
- Other political affiliations: Democratic Progressive Party; Independent; Taiwan Solidarity Union
- Education: Kaohsiung Medical University (MD); University of California, Berkeley (MPH)
- Occupation: politician
- Profession: psychiatrist

Chen Yung-hsing (Chinese: 陳永興; born 12 August 1950) is a Taiwanese psychiatrist and politician.

== Education ==
Chen earned a Doctor of Medicine (M.D.) from Kaohsiung Medical University in 1975 and a Master of Public Health (M.P.H.) from the University of California, Berkeley, in 1985.

== Political career and activism ==
Chen was a cofounder of the 228 Peace Day Association, established in February 1987. He served in the National Assembly from 1992 to 1996 as a member of the Democratic Progressive Party. On 4 May 1992, Chen and fellow DPP members Huang Hsin-chieh and Edgar Lin walked out of the assembly, criticizing the body for procedural violations during a vote against reforms proposed by the opposition. In September 1993, the party drafted Chen to contest the Hualien County magistracy. Kuomintang candidate Wang Ching-feng won the election. Subsequently, Chen was elected to the Legislative Yuan in 1995 as an independent. Chen's unsuccessful 1998 reelection campaign was backed by the New Nation Alliance. He later became a member of the Taiwan Solidarity Union. After joining the TSU, Chen became an advisor to President Chen Shui-bian and led the party's Arbitration Committee. He was named to the TSU proportional representation party list for the 2008 legislative elections, but did not win. In November 2019, Chen accepted a nomination from the New Power Party to serve as an at-large legislative candidate in the 2020 elections, placing seventh on the party list. In September 2026, Lai Ching-te's nomination of Chen as vice president of the Control Yuan, as well as the nomination of 26 others to vacant seats on the Control Yuan, was rejected by the Legislative Yuan.

== Later career ==
A psychiatrist, Chen led the Kaohsiung Municipal United Hospital as superintendent. He later became director of St. Mary's Hospital, based in Luodong, Yilan. In this position, he advocated for expansion of eldercare. By 2016, Chen had left St. Mary's and become chairman of Taiwan People News. While with the organization, Chen pushed for Taiwanese athletes to use Taiwan as a national team name, instead of Chinese Taipei, starting with the 2020 Tokyo Olympics. He made several statements on the topic in 2018 in support of a referendum seeking to change Taiwan's national team name. When Chinese Taipei Olympic Committee chairman Lin Hong-dow opposed the referendum, Chen filed suit against Lin on several charges, believing Lin's statements to have misled Taiwanese athletes and the public. In December, Chen announced that the Taiwan People News outlet would be suspending operations.

Under Chen's leadership, the Taiwan People News also worked with other civic groups to advocate for Taiwan independence. Chen marked the seventieth anniversary of the 228 Incident in 2017 by participating in a commemoration march. He stated later that year that he believed the political "status quo" between China and Taiwan was separation, not the 1992 consensus.

Prior to the 2019 Democratic Progressive Party presidential primary, Chen was supportive of William Lai's bid for office. After incumbent president Tsai Ing-wen was declared the winner, Chen criticized the primary process for a number of delays, and chastised the Tsai administration for passing amendments to the Referendum Act.
