= List of county magistrates of Hualien =

The magistrate of Hualien is the chief executive of the government of Hualien County in Taiwan. This list includes directly elected magistrates of the county. The incumbent Magistrate of the county is Hsu Chen-wei of Kuomintang since 25 December 2018.

== Directly elected County Magistrates ==
China Democratic Socialist Party Kuomintang Democratic Progressive Party Independent People First Party

№	Portrait	Name (Birth–Death)	Term of Office		Political Party	Term
1		Yang Chung-ching 楊仲鯨; Yáng Zhòngjīng (1898–1967)	15 November 1950	2 June 1954	China Democratic Socialist Party	1
2		Lin Mao-sheng 林茂盛; Lín Màoshèng	2 June 1954	2 June 1957	Kuomintang	2
3		Hu Tzu-ping 胡子萍; Hú Zǐpíng	2 June 1957	2 June 1960	Kuomintang	3
4		Ko Ting-hsuan 柯丁選; Kē Dīngxuǎn	2 June 1960	2 June 1964	Kuomintang	4
4		Ko Ting-hsuan 柯丁選; Kē Dīngxuǎn	2 June 1964	2 June 1968	Kuomintang	5
5		Huang Fu-shou 黃福壽; Huáng Fúshòu	2 June 1968	1 February 1973	Kuomintang	6
5		Huang Fu-shou 黃福壽; Huáng Fúshòu	1 February 1973	20 July 1976	Kuomintang	7
—		Ko Ting-hsuan 柯丁選; Kē Dīngxuǎn	20 July 1976	20 December 1977	Kuomintang	7
6		Wu Shoei-yun 吳水雲; Wú Shuǐyún	20 December 1977	20 December 1981	Kuomintang	8
6		Wu Shoei-yun 吳水雲; Wú Shuǐyún	20 December 1981	20 December 1985	Kuomintang	9
7		Chen Ching-shui 陳清水; Chén Qīngshuǐ	20 December 1985	20 December 1989	Kuomintang	10
8		Wu Kuo-tung 吳國棟; Wú Guódòng	20 December 1989	16 April 1993	Kuomintang	11
—		Chen Cheng-hsiung 陳正雄; Chén Zhèngxióng	16 April 1993	20 December 1993	Kuomintang	11
9		Wang Ching-feng 王慶豐; Wáng Qìngfēng (1933–2024)	20 December 1993	20 December 1997	Kuomintang	12
9		Wang Ching-feng 王慶豐; Wáng Qìngfēng (1933–2024)	20 December 1997	20 December 2001	Kuomintang	13
10		Chang Fu-hsing 張福興; Zhāng Fúxīng (1942–2003)	20 December 2001	18 May 2003	Kuomintang	14
—		Fan Kuang-chun 范光群; Fàn Guāngqún (1939–)	20 May 2003	19 August 2003	Democratic Progressive Party	14
11		Hsieh Shen-shan 謝深山; Xiè Shēnshān (1939–)	19 August 2003	20 December 2005	Kuomintang	14
11		Hsieh Shen-shan 謝深山; Xiè Shēnshān (1939–)	20 December 2005	20 December 2009	Kuomintang	15
		Fu Kun-chi 傅崐萁; Fù Kūnqí (1962–)	20 December 2009	25 December 2014	Independent	16
12		Fu Kun-chi 傅崐萁; Fù Kūnqí (1962–)	20 December 2009	25 December 2014	People First Party	16
		Fu Kun-chi 傅崐萁; Fù Kūnqí (1962–)	20 December 2009	25 December 2014	Independent	16
		Fu Kun-chi 傅崐萁; Fù Kūnqí (1962–)	25 December 2014	12 September 2018	Independent	17
—		Tsai Pi-chung 蔡碧仲; Cài Bìzhòng (1958–)	17 September 2018	25 December 2018	Independent	17
13		Hsu Chen-wei 徐榛蔚; Xú Zhēnwèi (1968–)	25 December 2018	25 December 2022	Kuomintang	18
13		Hsu Chen-wei 徐榛蔚; Xú Zhēnwèi (1968–)	25 December 2022	Incumbent	Kuomintang	19
