= Chinese Italian =

Chinese Italian or Italian Chinese may refer to:

- Chinese people in Italy
- Italians in China
- China–Italy relations
- Italy–Taiwan relations
- Mixed race people of Chinese and Italian descent
