= Hsieh Shen-shan =

Taiwanese politician (born 1939)

- 謝深山

Magistrate of Hualien County
- In office 19 August 2003 – 20 December 2009
- Preceded by: Chang Fu-hsing; Fan Kuang-chun (acting)
- Succeeded by: Fu Kun-chi

Secretary-General of the Executive Yuan
- In office 27 January 1999 – 20 May 2000
- Preceded by: Wea Chi-lin
- Succeeded by: Chang Yu-hui

Minister of Council of Labor Affairs of the Republic of China
- In office 1994 – May 1997
- Preceded by: Chao Shou-po
- Succeeded by: Hsu Chieh-kuei

Member of Legislative Yuan
- In office 1973–1994
- Succeeded by: Chang Wea
- Constituency: Labor (until 1990); Hualien

Personal details
- Born: 10 February 1939 (age 87) Karenkō Prefecture, Taiwan, Empire of Japan
- Party: Kuomintang
- Occupation: Politician

Hsieh Shen-shan (Chinese: 謝深山; pinyin: Xiè Shēnshān; born 10 February 1939) is a Taiwanese politician.

== Political career ==
Hsieh served in the Legislative Yuan from 1973 to 1990 as a representative of laborers, then remained in the legislature until 1994, representing Hualien County. Hsieh left the legislature when he was chosen to head the Council of Labor Affairs. He stepped down from that position to run for Taipei County Magistrate in 1997. Hsieh lost to Su Tseng-chang and was named the secretary-general of the Executive Yuan the next year, before stepping down in 2000 upon the election of Chen Shui-bian. He came out of retirement in 2003 to run for the office of Hualien County magistrate after Chang Fu-hsing had died in office. The Kuomintang nominated Hsieh over many other KMT-affiliated candidates, including Chang's widow Liu Chao-a, and former magistrate Wu Kuo-tung. Listed second on the ballot, Hsieh finished first in the by-election with 73,710 votes. He was reelected in 2005 and stepped down at the end of his term in 2009.
