= Joe Hung =

Taiwanese journalist, diplomat, and translator

- 洪健昭

Representative of Taiwan to Italy
- In office 1993–2000

Personal details
- Born: February 15, 1932 Tamsui District, Taihoku City, Taihoku Prefecture, Taiwan, Japan
- Died: February 20, 2018 (aged 86) Linkou, New Taipei, Taiwan
- Education: National Taiwan University (BA); Southern Illinois University (MA); Georgetown University (PhD)

Hung Chien-chao (Chinese: 洪健昭; February 15, 1932 – February 20, 2018), also known as Joe Hung, was a Taiwanese journalist, diplomat, and translator. He served as a foreign correspondent for the Central News Agency (CNA) from 1974 until 1989, as well as the President of CNA from 1990 until 1992 and chairman from 1992 to 1993 and again 2009 until 2011. Hung also joined the Ministry of Foreign Affairs' diplomatic corp during the 1990s. He served as the Representative of Taiwan to Italy from 1993 until 2000.

== Early life and education ==
Hung was born on February 15, 1932, in Tamsui, Taiwan, to a professionally successful family. His father worked for the Bank of Taiwan branch in Banqiao District. Hung was raised in Taiwan under Japanese rule before and during World War II. As a result, Hung was fluent in Japanese, as well as Mandarin Chinese and English. Hung considered his mother language Japanese, followed by English and Mandarin in order of proficiency. He was educated by the Japanese prior to their defeat in 1945 during his sophomore year in high school. He spoke Japanese so fluently that he later served as the Japanese interpreter for President Lee Teng-hui. Hung and his wife only conversed in Japanese at home until the birth of their first child, when they added Taiwanese Hokkien to their household.

Hung studied foreign languages and literature at National Taiwan University and graduated in 1950. He served as an English-language interpreter in the Republic of China Armed Forces for five years, where he coordinated the communications with American troops stationed on Taiwan.

Hung moved to the United States, where he earned his master's degree in journalism from Southern Illinois University in 1965. Later, he earned a Ph.D. in history from Georgetown University in Washington, D.C., in 1981. His doctoral dissertation, completed under Jesuit priest and historian Joseph Sebes, was titled, "Taiwan under the Cheng family 1662–1683: Sinicization after Dutch rule".

== Career ==
He reported for United Press International (UPI) from the late 1960s until the early 1970s.

Hung also worked for The China Post, an English-language newspaper based in Taiwan, where he served as chief editor. During his tenure as The China Post's chief editor, a major typhoon struck Taiwan. Hung was one of just two newspaper employees who made it to work at the Post during the typhoon. According to Jack Huang, the then-director of the newspaper, Hung edited the entire newspaper himself during the storm so that the daily paper could be published the next day.

In 1974, Hung began work for the Central News Agency (CNA), the state news agency for the Republic of China (Taiwan). He served as a CNA correspondent in Jordan from 1974 to 1977, Washington, D.C., from 1977 to 1980, Houston, Texas, from 1980 to 1983, Tokyo from 1983 until 1987, and London from 1987 until 1989.

In 1990, Hung was named President of CNA, a position he held until 1992. He was also appointed chairman of CNA for two separate tenures: 1992–1993 and again from 2009 until 2011.

Hung joined the Ministry of Foreign Affairs as a diplomat in the 1990s. He served as the Representative of Taiwan to Italy from 1993 until 2000. According to colleagues and aides, Hung, a talented linguist, took only a week to master the Italian language. Hung maintained good personal and professional relations with Italian officials, which led to an agreement to allow Taiwanese airlines to fly to Italy. Hung also oversaw the opening of the Taipei Economic and Cultural Representative Office, known Ufficio di Rappresentanza di Taipei in Italia, during his tenure as Representative.

Hung later worked with Stephen S. F. Chen, another diplomat and politician, at the National Policy Foundation, a think tank affiliated with the Kuomintang.

In 2010, Hung released the first ever English-language translation of the works of Lai He, a native Taiwanese poet and writer. Hung was chosen for the translation due to his experience as a linguist, translator and historian. The first English-language volume of Lai He's work, Lai He Fiction, a collection of twenty-one short stories translated by Hung, was published as a series of columns in The China Post before release as a book on October 22, 2010. The project was funded by the Central News Agency and the Hakka Affairs Council.

In 2011, Hung published his book, A New History of Taiwan, inspired by Lian Heng's General History of Taiwan. He decried Taiwan's political divisions in the book, which he argued hindered the country's development. Additionally, he trained translators and taught journalism at several Taiwanese universities.

== Death ==
Hung was diagnosed in January 2018 with rectal cancer that had spread to the kidneys. He was admitted to the hospital in January and underwent surgery, which initially proved successful. However, Hung suffered a heart attack and pulmonary infection during his recovery. Joe Hung died from complications of heart and lung disease at Linkou Chang Gung Memorial Hospital on February 20, 2018, at the age of 86. His funeral was held on March 6, 2018, at the Taipei Municipal Second Funeral Parlor.
