= AMLO (disambiguation) =

Andrés Manuel López Obrador, or AMLO, is the 65th president of Mexico.

AMLO may also refer to:

- Anti-Money Laundering Office (Thailand)
- Anti-Money Laundering Office, Executive Yuan, Taiwan
- Annual Missile Launch Operation, at Wheelus Air Base in the 1950s
- Air Mobility Liaison Officer of the United States Air Force

== See also ==
- Amloh, a town in India
- Low-power broadcasting
