= Chang Wea =

Taiwanese politician

Chang Wea (Chinese: 張偉; born 12 July 1933) is a Taiwanese politician.

Chang was born in Tengzhou on 12 July 1933. He was director of the Hualien branch of the Veterans Affairs Council from 1 July 1992. Chang was seated as a member of the Legislative Yuan on 15 March 1995, replacing Hsieh Shen-shan, who had been named head of the Council of Labor Affairs in 1994.
