= Under the Roof of One China =

Under the Roof of One China is a political principle introduced by James Soong in regard to the relationship between Taiwan and the World Health Organization.

In 2003, during the 2004 Republic of China presidential election campaign, both mainland China (People's Republic of China) and Taiwan (Republic of China) had an epidemic of severe acute respiratory syndrome (SARS) at the same time. Taiwan, being one of the most endemic areas, did not receive advice from the World Health Organization (WHO) because it lost its UN seat in 1976. Taiwan claims that the lack of direct communication precluded proper handling of the disease and caused unnecessary deaths on the island.

In May 2003, James Soong, the vice presidential candidate under Lien Chan, criticized the ruling party for not being able to participate in WHO and thus receiving no international assistance on controlling the spread of SARS. Soong proposed that once elected, he would not challenge the One-China principle set by the People's Republic of China but at the same time would seek international participation in different international organizations. He named this cross-strait policy "Under the Roof of One China". Soong believed that with this principle, he would be able to lead Taiwan to obtain a seat in WHO. Political opponents questioned how he could guard the sovereignty of Taiwan and accept Taiwan as a part of China at the same time. The principle was subsequently abandoned by him and his running mate in the 2004 presidential election.

== See also ==
- Political status of Taiwan
