= Wu Shoei-yun =

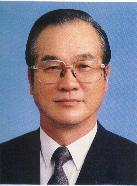

Magistrate of Hualien County
- In office December 20, 1977 – December 20, 1985

Personal details
- Born: May 10, 1930 (age 95) Yoshino Village, Karenkō, Taiwan (now Ji'an, Hualien)
- Occupation: Politician; Scout

Shoei-Yun Wu (Chinese: 吳水雲; pinyin: Wú Shuǐyún, born May 10, 1930) is a Taiwanese politician and educator, serving as county magistrate of Hualien from 1977 to 1985, and International Commissioner of the Boy Scouts of China, as well as Chairman of the Asia-Pacific Scout Committee.

In 1996, Wu was awarded the 256th Bronze Wolf, the only distinction of the World Organization of the Scout Movement, awarded by the World Scout Committee for exceptional services to world Scouting.
