= Stanley Kao =

Taiwanese diplomat

- 高碩泰
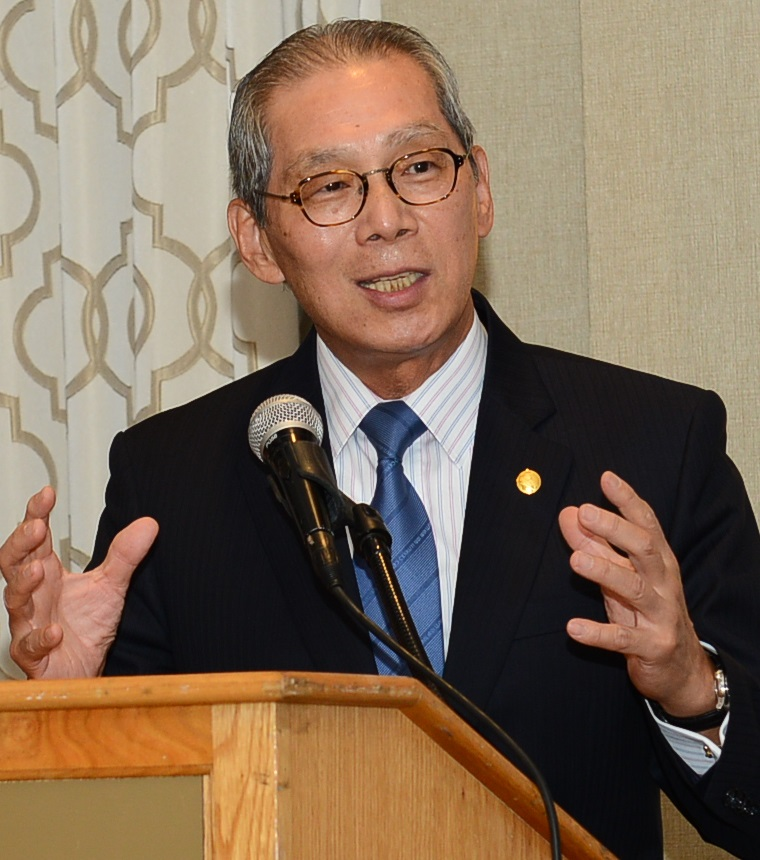

Taiwanese Representative to the United States
- In office 5 June 2016 – 20 July 2020
- Preceded by: Shen Lyu-shun
- Succeeded by: Hsiao Bi-khim

Taiwanese Representative to Italy
- In office 2013 – 4 June 2016

Taiwanese Representative to Hungary
- In office 1 February 2008 – 2010

Deputy Taiwanese Representative to the United States
- In office June 2004 – 31 January 2008
- Representative: Chen Chien-jen; David Lee; Joseph Wu
- Preceded by: Michael Tsai

Personal details
- Born: 16 May 1953 (age 72) Taipei, Taiwan
- Spouse: Sherry Sung (宋小芬)
- Education: National Taiwan University (BA); National Chengchi University (MA)

Stanley Kao Shuo-tai (Chinese: 高碩泰; pinyin: Gāo Shuòtài; born 16 May 1953) is a Taiwanese diplomat. He was Taiwan's representative to the United States from 2016 to 2020.

== Early life and education ==
Born 16 May 1953 in Taipei, Kao obtained his bachelor's degree in political science from National Taiwan University in 1975 and master's degree in international law and diplomacy from National Chengchi University (NCCU) in 1980.

== Diplomatic career ==
After graduating from NCCU, Kao began working for the Ministry of Foreign Affairs (MOFA) in 1980. He was sent to the Taipei Economic and Cultural Representative Office (TECRO) in Honolulu, Hawaii, and later assigned to TECRO in Atlanta, Georgia in 1993. Kao then became an adviser to TECRO in Malaysia. From 1996 to 1997, he was a fellow at Harvard University's Center for International Affairs. By 2000, Kao had become the deputy director general of MOFA's North American affairs department. He was promoted to director general of that division some time the next year. In 2002, he was appointed deputy representative of the Republic of China to the World Trade Organization. Kao then served as the deputy representative to the United States, beginning in 2004. He was named representative to Hungary in November 2007, and took office on 1 February 2008. After his stint in Hungary, Kao was named the Director General for Economic Affairs and International Cooperation in 2010. Kao was appointed the ROC representative to Italy in 2013. On 23 May 2016, he was appointed as the ROC representative to the United States. Kao made his first official trip to the United States on 5 June, prior to a swearing-in ceremony held on 2 August. Kao was replaced in June 2020, when the Tsai Ing-wen presidential administration named Hsiao Bi-khim to the post.

== Personal life ==
Kao is married to Sherry Sung, with whom he has one daughter.

== Honors ==
- 2024 Order of Brilliant Star with Grand Cordon
