= Fan Kuang-chun =

Taiwanese lawyer and politician (born 1939)

- 范光群
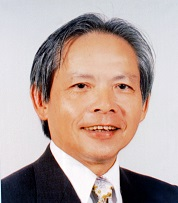

Secretary-General of the Judicial Yuan
- In office 7 October 2003 – 2007

Magistrate of Hualien County (acting)
- In office 20 May 2003 – 19 August 2003
- Preceded by: Chang Fu-hsing
- Succeeded by: Hsieh Shen-shan

Governor of Taiwan Province
- In office 1 February 2002 – 7 October 2003
- Preceded by: Chang Po-ya
- Succeeded by: Lin Kuang-hua

Minister of the Hakka Affairs Council of the Republic of China
- In office 14 June 2001 – 1 February 2002
- Preceded by: Position established
- Succeeded by: Yeh Chu-lan

Personal details
- Born: 16 March 1939 (age 87) Shinchiku Prefecture, Taiwan, Empire of Japan
- Party: Independent
- Other political affiliations: Democratic Progressive Party (2003)
- Education: National Taiwan University (LLB); Columbia University (JD)
- Profession: Lawyer

Fan Kuang-chun (Chinese: 范光群; pinyin: Fàn Guāngqún; born 16 March 1939) is a Taiwanese lawyer and politician.

== Education and legal career ==
Fan graduated from National Taiwan University with a Bachelor of Laws (LL.B.) degree, then studied law in the United States at Columbia University, where he earned a Juris Doctor (J.D.) from Columbia Law School in 1972.

Fan and John Chen co-founded Formosa Transnational Attorneys at Law in 1974. Fan has also worked for the Examination Yuan and served as a judge at the district court level in Taipei and Taichung.

== Political career ==
Fan served as spokesman for a group of cross-strait relations advisers President Chen Shui-bian formed in 2000. On 14 June 2001, Chen started the Hakka Affairs Council, and appointed Fan the first minister. Fan left the Hakka Affairs Council to become governor of Taiwan Province. He joined the Democratic Progressive Party in January 2003. During his governorship, Hualien County Magistrate Chang Fu-hsing died in office, and Premier Yu Shyi-kun named Fan the acting magistrate on 20 May 2003. On 7 October 2003, Fan was selected as the secretary-general of the Judicial Yuan by Chen Shui-bian. That same day, he resigned from the Democratic Progressive Party. In July 2007, media speculation linked Fan to a promotion as vice president of the Judicial Yuan, but he remained secretary-general of the body until at least September of that year.
