= 2004 Taiwanese presidential election =

- 20 March 2004
- Registered: 16,507,179
- Turnout: 80.28% (▼2.41pp)
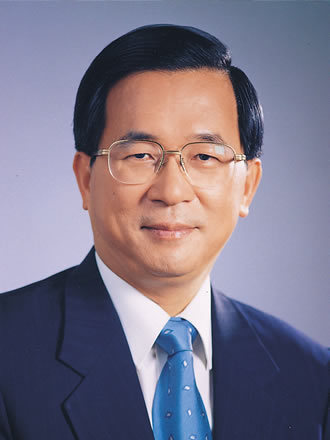

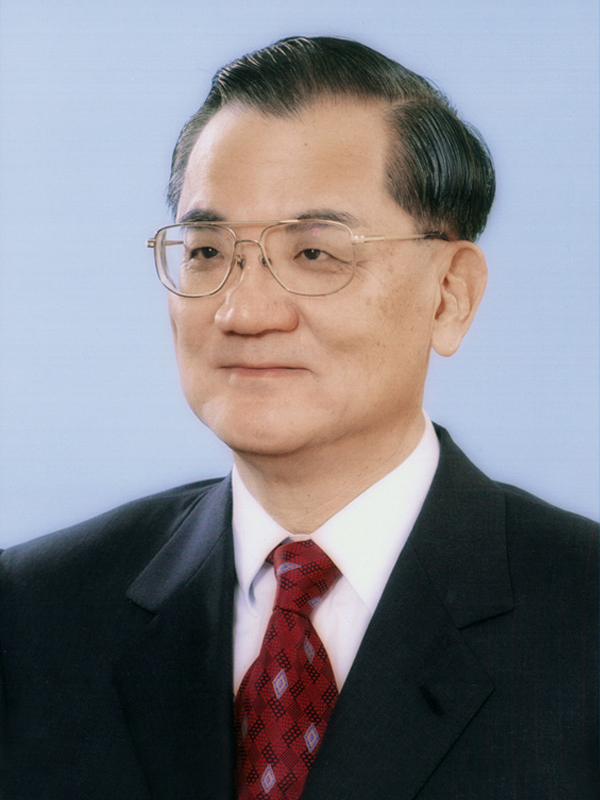
Nominee	Chen Shui-bian	Lien Chan
Party	DPP	Kuomintang–PFP
Running mate	Annette Lu	James Soong
Popular vote	6,471,970	6,442,452
Percentage	50.11%	49.89%
President before election
Chen Shui-bian
DPP
Elected President
Chen Shui-bian
DPP

Presidential elections were held in Taiwan on 20 March 2004. A consultative referendum took place on the same day regarding relations with the People's Republic of China.

President Chen Shui-bian and Vice President Annette Lu of the Democratic Progressive Party were re-elected by a narrow margin of 0.22% over a combined opposition ticket of Kuomintang (KMT) Chairman Lien Chan and People First Party Chairman James Soong. Lien and Soong refused to concede and unsuccessfully challenged the results.

== Formation of the tickets ==
=== Democratic Progressive Party ===
In the months leading up to December 2003, there was speculation as to whether President Chen would choose Vice President Annette Lu as his running mate. Polls had consistently showed that Chen would do better with another candidate such as Taipei county administrator Su Tseng-chang or Kaohsiung mayor Frank Hsieh, and many of the DPP's most popular lawmakers had petitioned Chen to seriously consider another candidate. After several weeks of very public infighting between various factions of the DPP, Chen formally nominated Lu as his running mate on December 11. They were backed by the Pan-Green Coalition.

The existence of only two tickets on the ballot led to several protest movements against both coalitions (most notably the Alliance of One Million Invalid Ballots) asking people to disqualify their ballots on purpose. This was partly responsible for the high number of invalid votes compared to the 2000 election.

=== Kuomintang and People First Party ===
In February 2003, the KMT and PFP agreed to run a combined ticket representing the entire Pan-Blue Coalition with Lien Chan for president and James Soong for vice president. The campaign emblem for the Lien-Soong campaign was a two-seat bicycle with a blue figure in the first seat and an orange figure in the second. There were initial doubts to this pairing since it was believed that the two men personally disliked each other—during the 2000 presidential election, Lien had accused Soong of positioning his family graves to interfere with Lien's Feng Shui, forcing Lien to reposition his graves. Additionally, it was thought to be difficult for the two men to agree upon who would run for president and who would run for vice president. Though Soong polled ahead of Lien in 2000 and was thought to be much more charismatic, he ended up running for vice president. The PFP's poor showing in the 2001 legislative election may have played a role in this decision. Initially, it was believed that the Lien-Soong ticket would be a sure win, given that both men garnered a combined 59.9% of the vote in 2000.

== Issues ==
Although the political spectrum on Taiwan is defined in terms of Taiwan independence versus Chinese unification, both campaigns took moderate positions on this issue. Members of the electorate who were influenced greatly by either independence or unification were loyal iron votes for the Pan-Green or Pan-Blue coalitions respectively, so the goal of both campaigns was to capture the moderate middle.

The theme of the Pan-Green Coalition was to portray themselves as Taiwanese nationalists and reformers and the opposition as corrupt and lacking in loyalty to Taiwan. The theme of the Pan-Blue Coalition was to question Chen's competence and also to focus in on issues which interested specific interest groups. The Pan-Blue Coalition staunchly defended the existence of the Republic of China and also rejected unification under one country, two systems. They also abandoned the Under the Roof of One China policy.

The main issues in the campaign were relations with the People's Republic of China, political reform, and the economy. In addition, although they tend not be noticed by the international press, local issues were important in the campaign, particularly because these issues influence undecided voters. These issues varied from county to county but included funding for irrigation projects, the location of expressways, and location of local administrative boundaries.

As the election approached, the tone of campaigning became increasingly negative, with charges of tax evasion, draft dodging, illegal financial transactions, and domestic violence on the part of Lien Chan. Most observers attributed the negative nature of the campaign to the fact that each campaign had moderated their platforms to the extent that they were similar to each other, leaving nothing other than personal attacks to attract the few uncommitted voters in the race.

== Demographic trends and public opinion ==
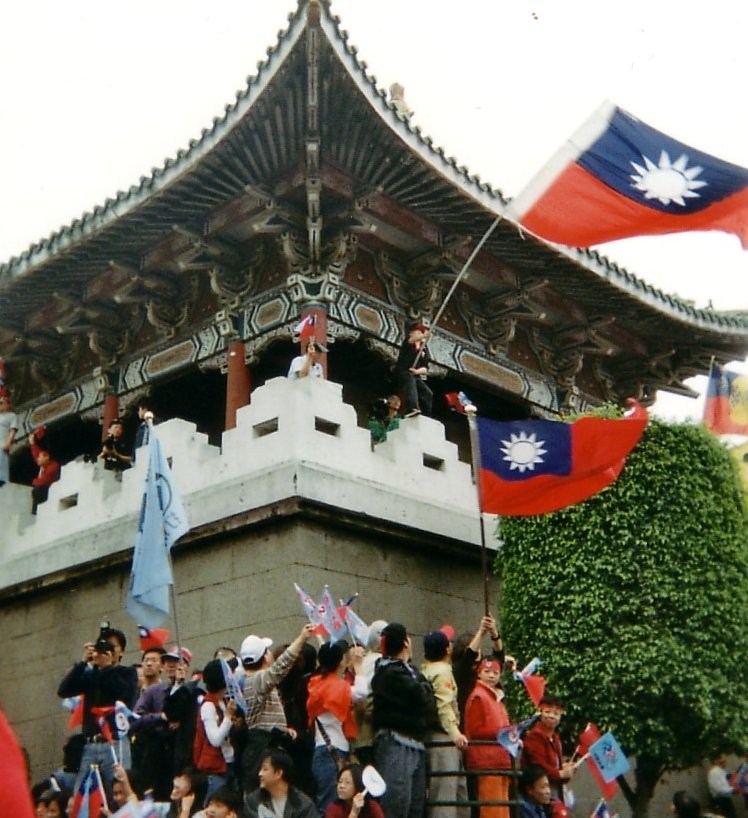
Pan-blue supporters.

On the day of the election, each member of the electorate (most adult citizens aged 20 and upwards) stamped one from the two choices of president/vice-president tickets on the ballot. Since Taiwan does not provide absentee ballots, large numbers of Taiwanese expatriates living in North America and mainland China returned to Taiwan to vote. Typical estimates indicate that about 20,000 people travelled from North America and between 100,000 and 150,000 people travelled from mainland China. Most analysts believe that the voters from North America would be split evenly between the two candidates, but that those from mainland China voted overwhelmingly for Pan-Blue.

Polls indicated that Taiwan is split with about one-third identifying themselves as Pan-Blue, one-third identifying themselves as Pan-Green, and one-third as centrist. They also showed very little cross-party voting with over 90% of people who identify with one party group stating that they would vote for the party.

Pan-Blue did well among mainlanders, Taiwanese aborigines, and Hakka. They also showed strong support among 30–50-year-olds, the very rich, the very poor, and residents of northern and eastern Taiwan. Pan-Green did well among people aged 20–30 and 50–60, people with formal education (such as doctors), and residents of southern Taiwan.

The margin in favor of Pan-Blue narrowed significantly after the 228 Hand-in-Hand Rally, with some polls showing Pan-Green in the lead. Taiwanese law forbids publishing any poll results, either current or historical, less than ten days before the election.

== Platforms and strategies ==
The DPP attempted to portray the Lien-Soong ticket as one which would sell out Taiwan to the PRC, and emphasized constitutional reform, proposing a new constitution, and a "peace referendum". This has led to fears that Chen intends to use a new constitution and a referendum to declare Taiwan independence. Worries about this have caused the United States at several points to ask for, and receive assurances that Chen has not abandoned the Four Noes and One Without policy.

The Lien-Soong ticket attempted to portray Chen as someone who let politics get in the way of improving the Taiwanese economy. Originally emphasizing Chen's inability to establish the Three Links with mainland China, the Lien-Soong ticket changed its message, in light of the SARS outbreak in mid-2003, to focus more on what they see as Chen's inability to deal with the recession. Until October 2003, the Lien-Soong strategy appeared to be to avoid doing or saying anything controversial to keep its lead. This strategy was widely seen as counterproductive by the end of October when Pan-Green started to pull ahead.

Chen's rise in the polls in 2003 caused the opposition to change its campaign strategy. To counter Chen's platform for a new constitution by 2008, the opposition campaigned for a major constitutional change by 2004. In addition, the opposition stopped its stalling of a referendum bill.

By the end of November 2003, the Lien-Soong ticket had appeared to recover some of the losses in polls that had occurred in October.

Both groups, in January 2004, seemed not to be focusing on issues of external policies, but instead on issues of personal finances. The Pan-Green Coalition raised the issue of Lien Chan's personal wealth and the properties which they asserted that the Kuomintang had illegally acquired while it was the ruling party. In response, the Pan-Blue Coalition asked why Chen Shui-bian has become much wealthier after assuming the presidency.

In March 2004, as the campaign was winding down, a series of posters comparing Chen to Adolf Hitler, Saddam Hussein, and Osama bin Laden were released by the Pan-Blue Coalition, creating controversy. The coalition eventually apologized to Taiwan's Jewish community for the comparison, although it refused to do so to Chen himself.

== Reaction from the PRC ==
Most observers believed that the People's Republic of China (PRC) would have preferred to see Chen Shui-bian replaced by an administration less sympathetic to Taiwan independence and more in favor of Chinese unification. However, some observers believed that the PRC cared less about who became the President of the ROC, than that this person establish economic linkages which Beijing believes would bind Taiwan irrevocably to the mainland.

In contrast to the elections of 1996 and 2000, the PRC was quiet in this election until early November. Most observers believed that this was because the PRC learned that any comments, especially in the form of threats, were likely to be counterproductive. The PRC broke its silence in mid November 2003 and issued several very sharp threats that it would not stand by if Taiwan declared independence. This widely was seen as in response to two factors. In early November 2003, Chen Shui-bian took an unofficial trip to the United States in which he was much more publicly seen than before. This trip increased his popularity on Taiwan to the point where most polls indicated that he was even with or slightly ahead of Lien. The trip in November 2003, also alarmed the PRC in that it appeared to convince them that the United States would do less to constrain Chen Shui-bian than they had earlier believed. In December 2003, after the United States clarified its position on Taiwan stating support for the One-China policy and opposition to any referendum that would tend to move Taiwan toward independence, the PRC toned down its criticism and focused its attention on the proposed referendum rather than on the presidential race.

=== Incident of the Pan-Blue campaign offices ===
In February 2004, former Justice Minister Liao Cheng-hao, attempted to establish four campaign office branches on mainland China with the purpose of convincing Taiwanese businessmen on the mainland to support Pan-Blue. News of this caused an uproar on Taiwan, especially after Liao was photographed with several fugitives from Taiwan. Lien Chan quickly distanced himself from this action, and Liao wrote an essay stating that his activities were not authorized. Shortly thereafter, the PRC Taiwan Affairs Office spokesman said, "We did not, do not and will not interfere with elections in Taiwan...We do not care who will be elected. What we care about is the winner's attitude towards cross-Taiwan Strait relations and national reunification," and PRC issued instructions to local officials not to allow Taiwanese businessmen to openly campaign on the mainland.

At the same time, a number of organizations were operating to help Taiwanese businessmen return to Taiwan in order to vote. Though these organizations were formally politically neutral, most Taiwanese businessmen on the mainland widely favored Pan-Blue.

== Election mechanics ==
The official campaigning period was from 07:00 to 22:00 every day from February 21, 2004, to March 19, 2004, though campaign activities had gone on for over a year. Taiwanese law forbids reports of polls in the last ten days of campaigning and any campaigning on the day of the election. Ballots in Taiwan are counted by hand with results generally available within two hours of the end of the election.

Because of Pan-Blue's strategy of having people cast no ballot in the referendum, one major controversy was the format of the election, specifically as whether the referendum questions would be on the same or different ballots as the presidency. After much debate the CEC decided that there would be a U-shaped line in which people would first cast a ballot for president and then cast a separate ballot for each of the two questions. Voters who choose not to cast a referendum ballot could exit the line at the base of the U. Near the end of the campaign, the CEC issued a number of conflicting and constantly changing directives as to what would constitute a valid ballot.

== Other developments ==
=== Official televised debates of the candidates ===
Televised debates between the two major candidates were held on February 14 and February 22. The parties were unable to reach agreement on dates for other presidential debates and for vice-presidential debates, though both candidates provided televised statements on February 28.

=== Popular mobilization ===
The main figures from the Pan-Green Coalition, including Chen Shui-bian and former president Lee Teng-hui, initiated the 228 Hand-in-Hand Rally, in which more than two million people joined hands from the very north of Taiwan to south to form an unbroken human chain. As an act of defiance against the P.R.China as well as a promotion of Taiwanese national identity, it occurred on February 28 in remembrance of the February 28 Incident. This demonstration was inspired by the human chain of two million that was organized in the Baltic states in 1989, where the Soviet Union later invaded to stop the Baltic states from declaring independence. Although billed as non-political, some of the symbolism of the demonstration, particularly the point in the event where participants "turn away from China," veered clearly toward support of Taiwan independence, and hence was not attended by members of the Pan-Blue Coalition.

In response, the Pan-Blue Coalition planned a series of events they dubbed "Heart Connecting to Hearts." These events included several rallies on 228, a blood drive, and a run in which a torch was passed from person to person through all 369 townships and cities of Taiwan in the course of two weeks. However, these events were unsuccessful at preventing a shift in support to Pan-Green after the 228 demonstration.

In response to declining polls numbers, the Pan-Blue coalition quickly organized a program of major rallies near the end of the election. Originally, the rallies were to protest black gold or political corruption, but the theme of the rallies were changed to "Change the President, save Taiwan." Critics of Pan-Blue argued that this change in theme was because Pan-Blue could not credibly be seen as anti-corruption. Supporters argued that this change was intended to focus the election on Chen's presumed lack of competence as president.

On March 13, the Pan-Blue Coalition held 24 rallies across Taiwan. The two million people attending beat gongs and made other noise and shouted "Change the President, save Taiwan" at 3:20 PM, in reference to the election date. The theme of the rallies were widely seen as an effort by Pan-Blue to shed the image that they were not really committed to Taiwan and would sell the island out to the PRC.

Soong led the rally in Taichung and knelt to kiss the ground along with his wife. Ten minutes later, Lien after giving a speech in Taipei which heavily talked about the need to love Taiwan and defend it, unexpectedly lay down prone on the ground kissing it with his wife and KMT Secretary-General Lin Fong-cheng.

Because of the poll blackout, there are no published reports which track the effect of 313 on Taiwanese public opinion, although anecdotal reports suggest that Pan-Blue supporters were deeply moved by Lien's actions while Pan-Green supporters saw them as disgusting and hypocritical.

=== Public endorsements ===
Buddhist master Wei Chueh endorsed Lien on March 11 and also urged his followers to boycott the referendum. This led to criticism from some other Buddhist leaders that his blunt condemnation of Chen broke the convention that religious figures remain politically neutral. In addition, Wei Chueh's temple was the object of many protests and had to be shut down until after the election.

Lee Yuan-tseh, widely credited for Chen's upset victory in 2000, issued a written statement on March 17 endorsing the Pan-Green candidates: "Four years ago, I endorsed Chen Shui-bian. Four years has elapsed, and I must admit in terms of the ability to run the country, the DPP has a lot of room to improve. But in terms of ideals and momentum to carry out reforms, the DPP is still the better choice." In response, Lien Chan, when asked about Lee's endorsement, remarked in English, "So what?"

=== Assassination attempt ===
On March 19, 2004, the last day of the election campaign, President Chen Shui-bian and Vice-president Annette Lu were both shot while campaigning in Tainan. They were traveling in an open convertible jeep in the presidential motorcade. One bullet struck Chen's abdomen and was later found in his clothes. It resulted in a flesh wound 8 cm long and 2 cm deep (four inches long, an inch wide, and an inch deep). Another bullet grazed Lu's knee and was found in the jeep. At first both believed that they had been hit by firecrackers, which are commonly used in Taiwanese political activities; the first sign of something more serious was when Chen noticed that he was bleeding from the abdomen, and that there was a bullet hole in the window.

Their injuries were not life-threatening, and both Chen and Lu were released from Chi-Mei Hospital on the same day without losing consciousness or having surgery. Nevertheless, the attack provoked shock and unease on Taiwan, where political violence of this kind is unknown in recent times.

Chen released a video in which he urged calm and indicated that neither his health nor the security of Taiwan were under threat. Within hours, police announced they were certain that the crime was not politically motivated, and that mainland China was not involved. On Internet chat rooms and talk radio, some Pan-Blue supporters theorized that the incident was faked in order for Chen to gain sympathy votes. These speculations were, however, considered highly offensive by Pan-Green supporters, and were not condoned by the Pan-Blue leadership until after Chen won the election.

Both Chen and Lien's election campaigns were suspended, but the next day's election was not postponed, as Taiwanese law only allows for suspension of election upon the death of a candidate. Lien Chan and Wang Jyng-ping tried to visit Chen on the night of the incident, but were unable to see the president because he was resting. Chen Shui-bian appeared publicly the next day when he voted.

=== Subsequent events ===
After all 13,749 polling places had reported, Lien appeared before his campaign headquarters and demanded a recount calling the vote "unfair". He demanded a full inquiry into the assassination attempt on Chen that had happened the day before, characterizing it as surrounded by "clouds of suspicion," seeming to fuel theories that it had been staged to get Chen re-elected.

On the next day, the KMT filed several lawsuits in major cities and Lien led 20,000 supporters in a march to the presidential office and staged an all night sit-in. This first set of lawsuits where thrown out because they were filed before a winner had been officially declared. Sit-ins were held in front of courthouses across Taiwan, with some protests becoming violent. The High Court ordered all ballot boxes be sealed, per Lien's demand. Protesters continued to camp on Ketagalan Boulevard outside the presidential office, despite Taipei Mayor Ma Ying-jeou's calls on Sunday night to have people return to work. On Monday morning, hundreds still remained, with numbers swelling to about 10,000 in the evening. The crowds still remained until one week later, demanding a recount and an international investigation into the apparent assassination attempt.

On March 23, President Chen issued three directives to quell the contested results:

- The Legislative Yuan should revise election laws to allow automatic recount if the margin of victory is less than 1% of the votes. The law, if passed, retroactively applies to the 2004 elections
- If the law is passed, the President agrees to have the recount as soon as possible and expects Lien to acknowledge the results from the recount.
- Since the President has shown goodwill in accepting Pan-Blue coalition's demand for a recount, the demonstrators in front of the Presidential Mansion should disperse and all protests be stopped.

The Legislature Yuan convened on March 26 to discuss the passage of the law, but the measure was not put to a vote. The Pan-Blue coalition demanded a recount by an executive order, bypassing the legislature; Chen claimed he had no such right, and that doing so would amount to declaring martial law.

Chen's controversial victory was officially confirmed by the Central Election Commission on March 26, 2004. Pan-Blue protesters stormed and hurled eggs at the CEC in response.

On March 27, 500,000 protesters massed in front of the presidential office (where protesters had remained all week). Lien told the crowd that he had counted more than 1,000 election irregularities (though he was not specific), but urged the crowd to disperse, promising more protests in the future if their demands were not met. Chen agreed to set up an independent task force to investigate the shooting and invited Henry Lee to be its leader.

At daybreak on March 28, 1,000 riot police moved into Ketagelan Boulevard to forcibly remove the last 200 protesters remaining. Another protest was held on the following Saturday, April 3, in which 15,000 people attended. The protest was deemed illegal and violently broken up by police.

On March 29, Chen and Lu signed letters promising not to contest the newly re-filed Pan-Blue petition for a recount, bypassing a lengthy judicial inquiry. On April 2, the High Court gave both sides five days to agree on a means to conduct the recount. Meanwhile, the Pan-Blue Coalition dropped its demand for another round of voting by disenfranchised members of the military and the police. By April 7, a procedural agreement for the recount still had not been reached and Pan-Blue held another rally the following Saturday, this time more than 100,000 strong. This protest was peaceful for most of the day, but several hundred demonstrators tried to storm the president's office in the evening. Police fired water cannons to push back the protesters.

A second lawsuit, originally filed on April 5 and refiled on April 7, charged that the Central Election Commission improperly allowed the presidential election to occur concurrently with the referendum and failed to postpone it after the apparent assassination attempt. This lawsuit sought to annul the results of the election. This was rejected by the High Court on November 4, 2004, but the Pan-Blue coalition appealed to the Supreme Court. The Court also asked Pan-Blue to pay for the cost of the lawsuit.

A judicial recount under the jurisdiction of a special panel of the High Court began on May 10 and ended on May 18. It was conducted by about 460 teams situated in 21 courthouses across the Taiwan area. Each team comprised seven members - one judge, two members each from the district court and the local government election authorities, and two witnesses each representing the plaintiff (pan-blue alliance) and the defendant (pan-green alliance). Any disputed votes were sent to High Court in Taipei for verification. After the recount, Chen was confirmed the winner of the election by a smaller margin (25,563 from 29,518).

The High Court ruled that the election was legitimate in both lawsuits and also eventually turned down the appeals. The judges declared in the 2nd lawsuit that the voter lists did not need to be considered as evidence despite reports that widespread election fraud was found in the voter lists.

In late 2005 the Central Election Commission ruled that video cameras would no longer be allowed in voting stations and also took measures to remove certain practices such as stamping the back of IDs to prevent repeat voting.

== Results ==
Candidate	Running mate	Party	Votes	%
Chen Shui-bian	Annette Lu	Democratic Progressive Party	6,471,970	50.11
Lien Chan	James Soong	Kuomintang	6,442,452	49.89
Total			12,914,422	100.00
Valid votes			12,914,422	97.45
Invalid/blank votes			337,297	2.55
Total votes			13,251,719	100.00
Registered voters/turnout			16,507,179	80.28
Source: CEC

=== By administrative division ===
Subdivision	Electorate	1		2		Invalid	Turnout	Margin
Subdivision	Electorate	Chen Shui-bian		Lien Chan		Invalid	Turnout	Margin
Subdivision	Electorate	Annette Lu		James Soong		Invalid	Turnout	Margin
Subdivision	Electorate	Votes	%	Votes	%	Invalid	Turnout	Margin
Taipei City	1,981,562	690,379	43.47%	897,870	56.53%	30,789	81.71%	-207,491
Taipei County	2,685,778	1,000,265	46.94%	1,130,615	53.06%	52,948	81.31%	-130,350
Keelung City	290,439	90,276	40.56%	132,289	59.44%	4,996	78.35%	-42,013
Yilan County	337,886	147,848	57.71%	108,361	42.29%	8,885	78.46%	39,487
Taoyuan County	1,273,026	448,770	44.68%	555,688	55.32%	30,838	81.33%	-106,918
Hsinchu County	323,148	92,576	35.93%	165,027	64.07%	6,737	81.80%	-72,451
Hsinchu City	271,967	96,818	44.88%	118,924	55.12%	5,143	81.22%	-22,106
Miaoli County	407,634	123,427	39.24%	191,059	60.76%	10,868	79.82%	-67,632
Taichung County	1,070,877	440,479	51.79%	410,082	48.21%	21,270	81.41%	30,397
Taichung City	710,555	267,095	47.34%	297,098	52.66%	10,566	80.89%	-30,003
Changhua County	947,526	383,296	52.26%	350,128	47.74%	26,288	80.18%	33,168
Nantou County	396,464	146,415	48.75%	153,913	51.25%	8,784	77.97%	-7,498
Yunlin County	552,795	243,129	60.32%	159,906	39.68%	16,748	75.94%	83,223
Chiayi County	421,904	199,466	62.79%	118,189	37.21%	11,554	78.03%	81,277
Chiayi City	193,458	85,702	56.06%	67,176	43.94%	2,905	80.53%	18,526
Tainan County	826,288	421,927	64.79%	229,284	35.21%	19,313	81.15%	192,643
Tainan City	547,903	251,397	57.77%	183,786	42.23%	8,247	80.93%	67,611
Kaohsiung City	1,117,380	500,304	55.64%	398,769	44.37%	15,012	81.81%	101,535
Kaohsiung County	919,717	425,265	58.40%	302,937	41.60%	21,903	81.56%	122,328
Pingtung County	669,646	299,321	58.11%	215,796	41.89%	13,383	78.92%	83,525
Taitung County	180,255	40,203	34.48%	76,382	65.52%	3,198	66.45%	-36,179
Hualien County	259,334	53,501	29.79%	126,041	70.21%	4,523	70.98%	-72,540
Penghu County	69,545	22,162	49.47%	22,639	50.53%	1,213	66.16%	-477
Kinmen County	45,353	1,701	6.45%	26,433	93.54%	1,069	64.39%	-24,732
Lienchiang County	6,739	248	5.76%	4,060	94.24%	117	65.66%	-3,812
Source: CEC Overview Table CEC Visual Query

=== Maps ===

Result by County level

Result by Township level

Vote leader and vote share in township-level districts.

Vote leader in county-level districts.

Winner vote lead over runner-up by township/city or district.

Size of lead between the two tickets.
