= Hsu Chen-wei =

Taiwanese politician (born 1968)

- 徐榛蔚
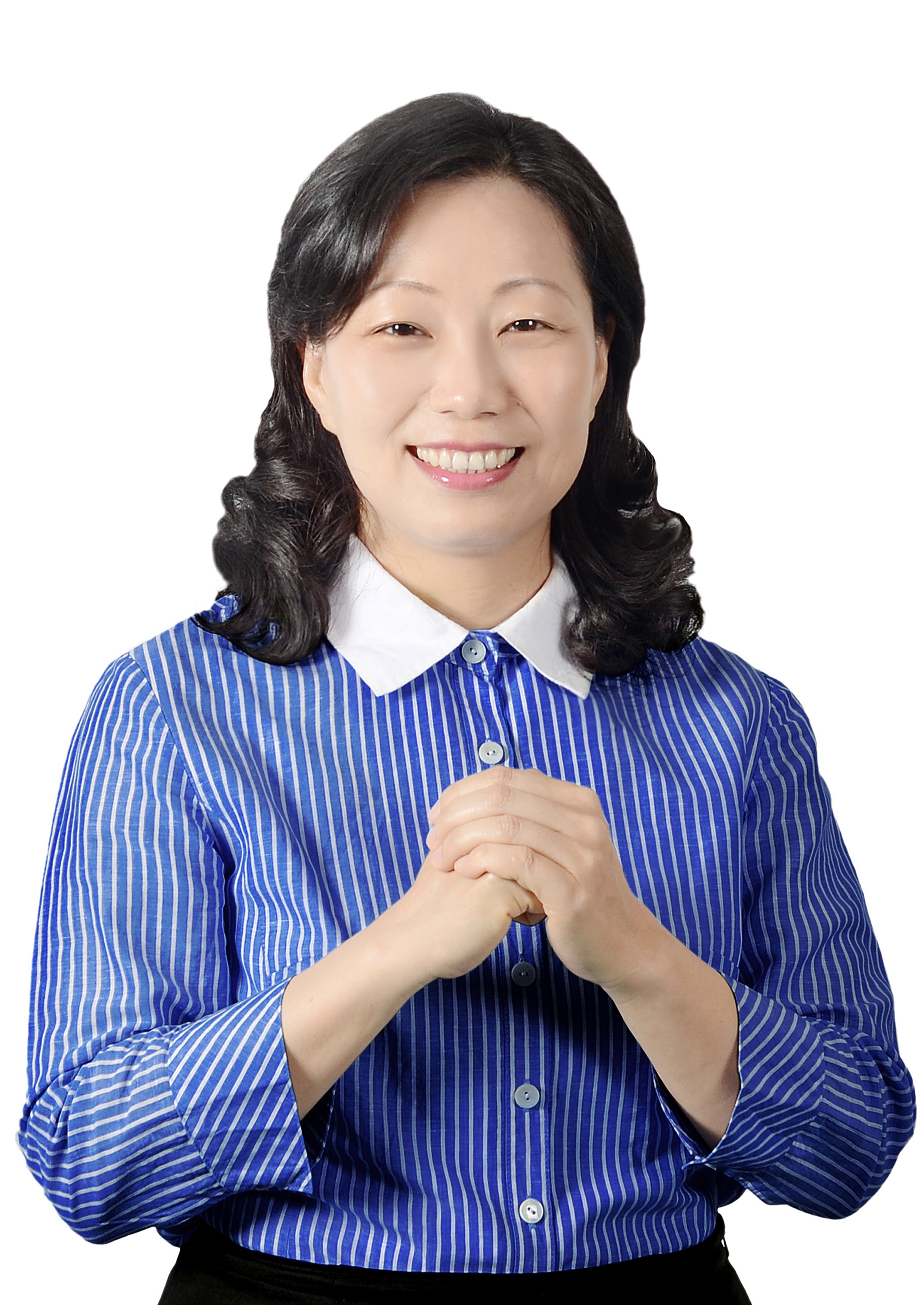
- Official portrait, 2018

13th Magistrate of Hualien
- Incumbent
- Assumed office 25 December 2018
- Deputy: Yen Hsin-chang
- Preceded by: Tsai Pi-chung (acting)

Member of the Legislative Yuan
- In office 1 February 2016 – 24 December 2018
- Succeeded by: Hui-Chen Tung
- Constituency: Proportional Representation; KMT Party-list №10
- Magistrate: Fu Kun-chi

Deputy Magistrate of Hualien
- In office 20 December 2009 – 22 December 2009
- Magistrate: Fu Kun-chi

Personal details
- Born: 12 October 1968 (age 57) Taoyuan, Taiwan
- Party: Kuomintang
- Other political affiliations: People First Party (2000–2007); Independent (2007–2015)
- Spouse: Fu Kun-chi (div. 2009) Fu Kun-chi (m. 2016)
- Education: Chinese Culture University (BA)

Hsu Chen-wei (Chinese: 徐榛蔚; pinyin: Xú Zhēnwèi; Wade–Giles: Hsü^{2} Chên^{1}-wei^{4}; born 12 October 1968) is a Taiwanese politician who currently serves as magistrate of Hualien County since 25 December 2018. She was re-elected in 2022, with 64.7% of the vote, defeating Kolas Yotaka.

== Political career ==
On 20 December 2009, Hsu was appointed as the deputy county magistrate by her former husband Fu Kun-chi. They had just divorced 2 days earlier on 18 December. Two days later, Hsu's appointment was withdrawn by the Ministry of the Interior on 22 December 2009 as the ministry deemed the divorce as a political fake marriage and the appointment was a conflict of interest with appointing a close relation to a government office. In March 2010, Fu was fined NT$1 million by the Control Yuan for conflict of interest.

In 2011, Hualien District Court found both of them guilty of having a false divorce to circumvent Public Officials Conflict of Interest Prevention Act (Chinese: 公職人員利益衝突迴避法) which bans the appointment of family members to political posts. Fu and Hsu were both sentenced to six and four months of jail respectively. Both opted to pay fines to avoid jail as the law allowed conversion of jail time to fines in certain circumstances.

Although Hsu's appointment as was withdrawn, she served in other positions during Fu's tenure as magistrate. Hsu was appointed the chairperson of Hualien China Youth Corps (Chinese: 救國團花蓮團) during Fu's first term as magistrate. She was then later appointed the captain of Hualien's Community Patrol (Chinese: 花蓮縣巡守) and subsequently the head of National Women's League (Chinese: 婦女後援會).

On 29 November 2014, Hsu participated in the Hualien County magistrate election as an independent candidate. Accordingly to the Taipei Times, her participation was deemed as a backup in the event her former husband Fu, who was also running as an independent candidate, was indicted for stock manipulation before the election. Hsu lost the election, placing fourth, to former husband Fu.

2014 Hualien County Magistrate Election
No.	Candidate	Party	Votes	Percentage
1	Fu Kun-chi	Independent	89,048	56.53%
2	Hsu Chen-wei	Independent	5,436	3.45%
3	Huang Shih-peng (黄師鵬)	Independent	2,369	1.50%
4	Ke Tsi-hai (柯賜海)	Independent	14,954	9.49%
5	Chu Kuo-hua (朱國華)	Independent	2,218	1.41%
6	Tsai Chi-ta (蔡啟塔)	KMT	43,504	27.62%

In 2016, she was elected as the member of the Legislative Yuan for the Kuomintang party-list in the proportional representation constituency until her inauguration as Hualien magistrate in 2018.

In 2018, Hsu was chosen by Kuomintang (KMT) to run for the 2018 Taiwanese local elections. She won the elections with 71.52% of the votes.

2018 Kuomintang Hualien County magistrate primary results
Candidates	Place	Result
Hsu Chen-wei	Called In	Walkover

2018 Hualien County Magistrate Election
No.	Candidate	Party	Votes	Percentage
1	Hsu Chen-wei	Kuomintang	121,297	71.52%
2	Liuh Siao-Mei (劉曉玫)	Democratic Progressive Party	43,879	25.87%
3	Huang Shih-peng (黃師鵬)	Independent	4,420	2.61%
Total voters			268,817	
Valid votes			169,596	
Invalid votes				
Voter turnout			63.09%	

== Personal life ==
Hsu and Fu divorced in 2009. They remarried in 2016.
