= Hsiao Bi-khim =

Vice President of the Republic of China since 2024 (born 1971)

- 蕭美琴
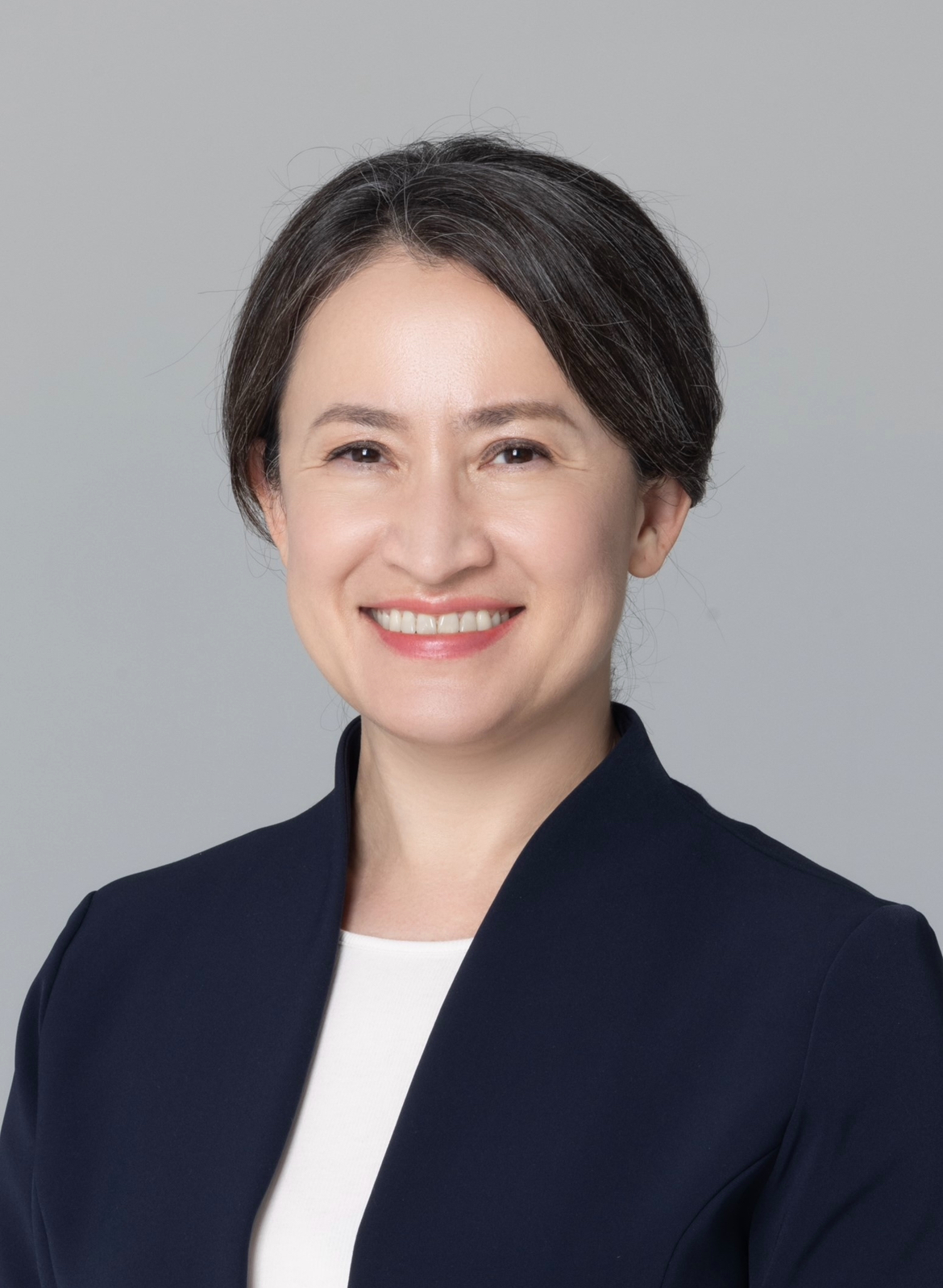
- Official portrait, 2024

16th Vice President of the Republic of China
- Incumbent
- Assumed office 20 May 2024
- President: Lai Ching-te
- Preceded by: Lai Ching-te

15th Representative of Taiwan to the United States
- In office 20 July 2020 – 30 November 2023
- President: Tsai Ing-wen
- Preceded by: Stanley Kao
- Succeeded by: Alexander Yui

Member of the Legislative Yuan
- In office 1 February 2012 – 31 January 2020
- Preceded by: Wang Ting-son
- Succeeded by: Fu Kun-chi
- Constituency: Hualien County (2016–2020); DPP Party list №7 (2012–2016)
- In office 1 February 2002 – 1 February 2008
- Constituency: Taipei 1st (2004–2008); National At-large (2002–2004)

Personal details
- Born: Bi-Khim Louise Hsiao; 7 August 1971 (age 55) Kobe, Japan
- Citizenship: Taiwan; United States (until 2002)
- Party: Democratic Progressive Party
- Education: Oberlin College (BA); Columbia University (MA)

Chinese name
- Traditional Chinese: 蕭美琴
- Simplified Chinese: 萧美琴
Transcriptions
Standard Mandarin
- Hanyu Pinyin: Xiāo Měiqín
- Bopomofo: ㄒㄧㄠ ㄇㄟˇ ㄑㄧㄣˊ
- Wade–Giles: Hsiao^{1} Mei^{3}-ch'in^{2}
- IPA: [ɕjáʊ mèɪ.tɕʰǐn]
Southern Min
- Hokkien POJ: Siau Bí-khîm

Hsiao Bi-khim (Chinese: 蕭美琴; pinyin: Xiāo Měiqín; Pe̍h-ōe-jī: Siau Bí-khîm; born Bi-khim Louise Hsiao; 7 August 1971) is a Taiwanese politician and diplomat who has served as the 16th vice president of the Republic of China since 2024. A member of the Democratic Progressive Party (DPP), she was previously the head of the Taipei Economic and Cultural Representative Office from 2020 to 2023.

Born in Kōbe, Japan, Hsiao was raised in Tainan, Taiwan, before moving to the United States as a teenager. After graduating from Oberlin College and Columbia University, she became active in the Taiwanese independence movement and served as an English interpreter under President Chen Shui-bian. She represented an at-large constituency and Taipei 1 in the Legislative Yuan from 2002 to 2008, then represented Hualien County in the 9th Legislative Yuan until 2020.

In 2023, Lai Ching-te named Hsiao his running mate in the 2024 presidential election, in which they successfully defeated Kuomintang (KMT) nominees Hou Yu-ih and Jaw Shaw-kong. She took office as vice president in May 2024. During her tenure, Hsiao has remained an important figure in the DPP's foreign policy circles.

== Early life and education ==
Hsiao was born on 7 August 1971 in Kōbe, Japan. She has a younger brother and younger sister. Her father, Hsiao Ching-fen (蕭清芬; 1935–2021), was a Taiwanese Presbyterian minister who immigrated to the United States in 1963, earned a doctorate in theology from Princeton Theological Seminary, (Note: Ching-fen's doctoral dissertation, completed in May 1968, was titled, "The Life and Teachings of T'an-Luan". He later became involved in the publication of a modern Taiwanese Hokkien version of the Bible.) and became the president of Tainan Theological College and Seminary. Her mother, Peggy Cooley (邱碧玉), is an American music teacher who was born in North Carolina to a wealthy family and graduated from Union Theological Seminary; Cooley became fluent in Taiwanese Hokkien while studying abroad in Taiwan. Hsiao's maternal family's presence in North America dates back to the Mayflower (1620). She is of mixed Chinese, Scottish, English, and Dutch ancestry.

Hsiao was raised in Tainan, where her father was a seminary professor and her mother taught the organ, xylophone, and recorder. She attended elementary school and junior high school in Tainan, and speaks Mandarin, Hokkien, and English fluently. She moved to the United States as a teenager and graduated from Montclair High School in Montclair, New Jersey. After high school, Hsiao attended Oberlin College, where she read dissident works by democracy activists in the college library. As an undergraduate, she wrote a letter to Annette Lu offering to campaign for Taiwan's induction to the United Nations, and was convinced by Lu to join the Taiwan Coalition for Democracy, a Taiwan independence group.

Hsiao graduated from Oberlin with a Bachelor of Arts in East Asian studies in 1993. She then pursued graduate studies at Columbia University, where she earned a Master of Arts in political science in 1995 with a specialization in international relations. She remained at Columbia to pursue a doctorate in political science and was recruited to establish an office for the DPP in Washington, D.C. She ultimately withdrew from the university's Ph.D. program in order to return to Taiwan to vote in the 1996 presidential election.

== Entry into politics ==
In the United States, Hsiao became active with the Democratic Progressive Party (DPP) representative office, serving as an activity coordinator. On returning to Taiwan, Hsiao became the party's international affairs director and represented the party at various international conferences for over a decade.

After Chen Shui-bian took office as the President of the Republic of China in 2000, Hsiao served as his interpreter and advisor for nearly two years. Her dual US and Taiwanese citizenship while she was holding a government position became an issue, and she renounced her US citizenship in 2002, as required by the Civil Servants Employment Law passed in 2000.

== Legislative career ==
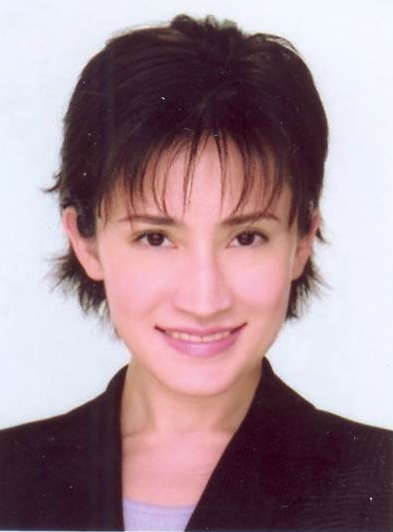
Official portrait during the 6th Legislative Yuan.

In January 2001, Hsiao announced her intention to run for the Legislative Yuan on the DPP ticket as a supplementary member representing overseas constituencies, citing her experience in international relations. She was subsequently elected in December the same year. Hsiao was an American citizen until 2002.

In the legislative elections of December 2004, Hsiao was reelected to the Legislative Yuan representing Taipei's first constituency, covering the northern districts of Xinyi, Songshan, Nangang, Neihu, Shilin, and Beitou. As a legislator, she served on the Foreign and Overseas Affairs Committee (外交及僑務委員會), the Procedure Committee (程序委員會), and the Discipline Committee (紀律委員會).

In 2004, she published the book 一個人也可以 (literally, "It's OK to be alone"), during her Legislative Yuan career. The book reflects on her personal life, work, involvement in Taiwan’s political movement, and romantic relationships.

Hsiao worked on a number of issues in the legislature, notably women's rights, the rights of foreigners in Taiwan, and other human rights. Hsiao supported amending the Nationality Law to allow individuals born to at least one parent of ROC nationality to also claim ROC nationality irrespective of age, and has also proposed and cosponsored anti-discrimination and anti-domestic violence amendments to the Immigration Act. She has also been a proponent of animal rights, proposing amendments to the Animal Protection Act, and also pushed for the passage of the Sexual Harassment Prevention Act in January 2005.

In May 2005, Hsiao represented the DPP at the annual congress of Liberal International in Sofia, Bulgaria, during which she was elected a vice-president of the organization. Hsiao alleged that she and other DPP representatives were followed throughout their visit to Bulgaria by two unidentified persons sent by the People's Republic of China embassy in Sofia.

The same month, Hsiao also started a campaign to encourage Taiwanese baseball fans to write e-mails to the New York Yankees to ask them to keep Taiwanese pitcher Chien-Ming Wang at the major league level.

Hsiao was one of the DPP lawmakers targeted by some party supporters as being insufficiently loyal, with a pro-independence radio show dubbing her "Chinese Khim" (中國琴) in March 2007, charging that she was close to the DPP's former New Tide faction. Defended by some other DPP members, Hsiao was still not nominated to stand for re-election by the DPP in the January 2008 legislative elections, a move some attributed to being the result of that controversy.

Hsiao left the Legislative Yuan after her term expired on 31 January 2008. She served as spokesperson for Frank Hsieh's unsuccessful 2008 presidential campaign. She is also vice chairman of the Taiwan Tibet Exchange Foundation, a member of the board of trustees of the Taiwan Foundation for Democracy, a member of the executive committee of the Council of Asian Liberals and Democrats, and a founding member of the Taiwan Association for Women in Sport (台灣女子體育運動協會).

From 2010, Hsiao spent a decade representing the DPP in Hualien County, a strongly pro-Kuomintang conservative region. In the same year, she lost with a slim minority in a by-election, but was still regarded as having broken the "iron vote" of the Kuomintang. She then set up a Hualien service office, and continued making weekly journeys between Taipei and Hualien.

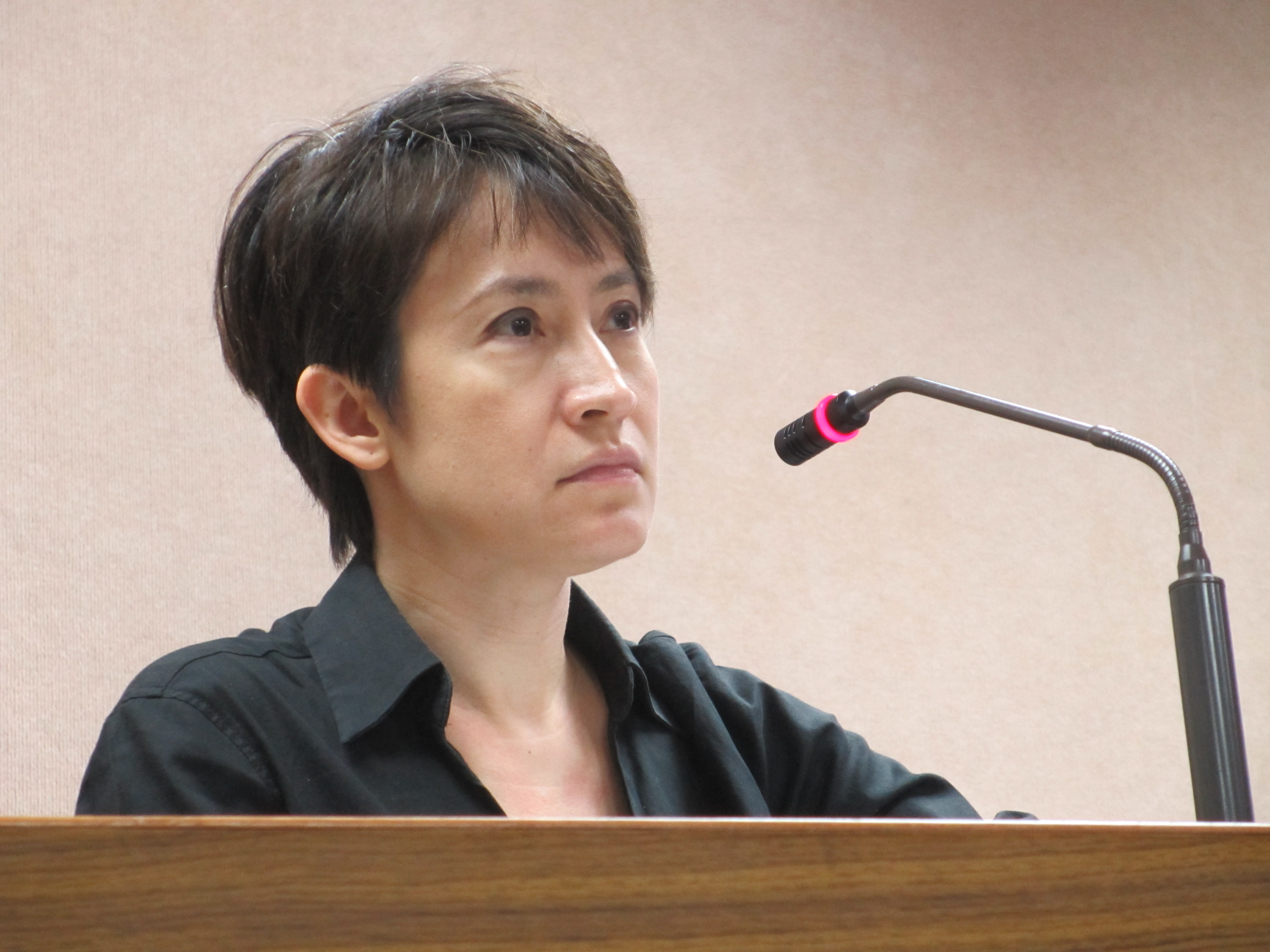
Hsiao at the Legislative Yuan, 2014

Hsiao returned to the Legislative Yuan in February 2012, elected via party list proportional representation. In 2016, Hsiao succeeded Wang Ting-son as legislator for Hualien County. In 2018, an unsuccessful recall campaign was organized against Hsiao because of her strong support for same-sex marriage legalization. Hsiao did not yield to pressure, and continued to speak out for Hualien Pride. In August 2019, she received the Democratic Progressive Party nomination to run for another term in Hualien County. She lost her seat to Fu Kun-chi in the 2020 legislative elections.

== Diplomatic career ==
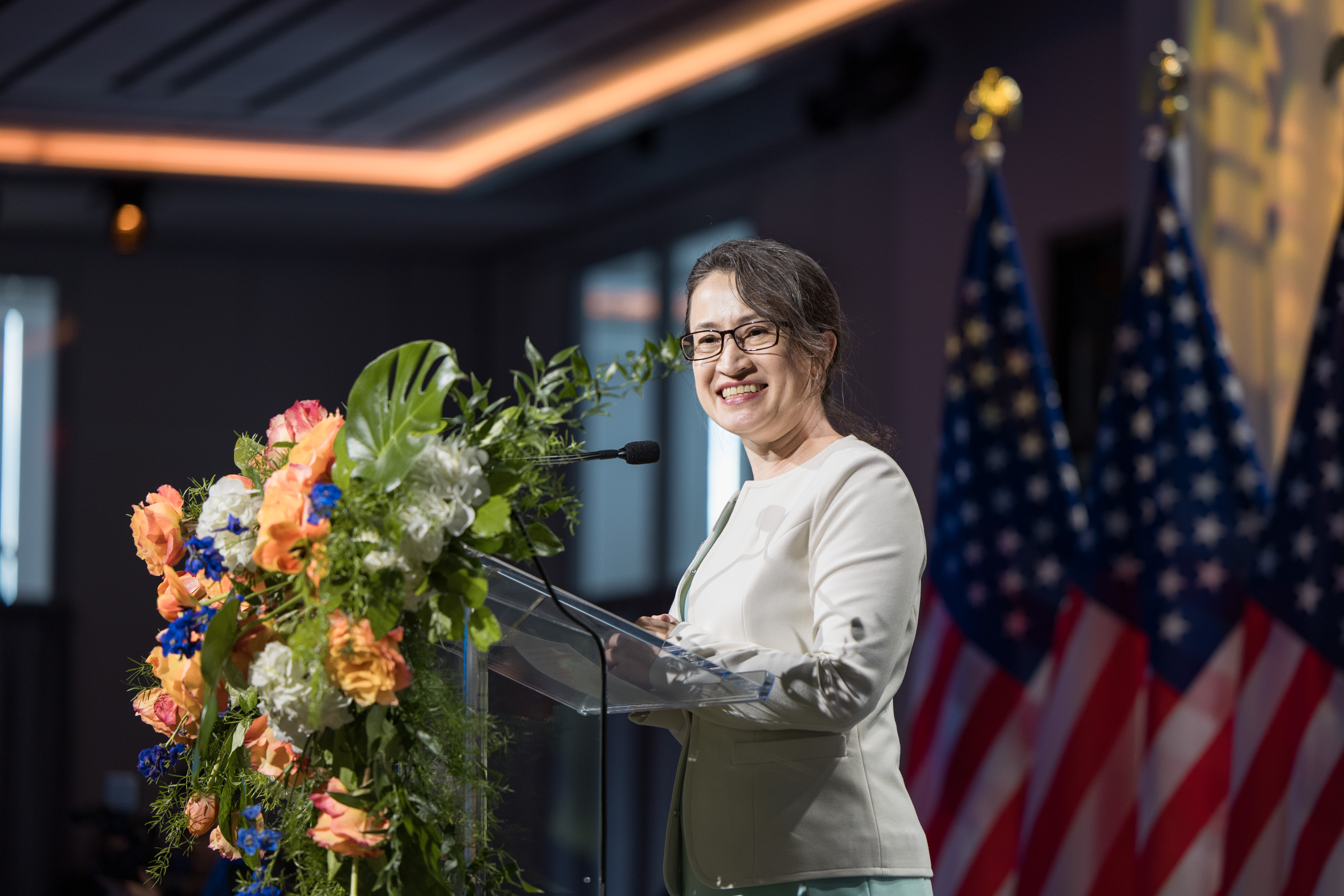
Taiwan's representative to the U.S., Hsiao Bi-khim, in New York

Hsiao stepped down from the Legislative Yuan upon the end of her term in 2020, and was subsequently named an adviser to the National Security Council in March 2020. That June, Hsiao was appointed Taiwan's representative to the United States. She succeeded Stanley Kao, and was the first woman to assume the role. Hsiao was sworn in to the office on 20 July 2020.

On 20 January 2021, Hsiao was officially invited to and attended the inauguration of US President Joe Biden, the first time Taiwan's US representative had officially attended a US presidential inauguration since the US broke off diplomatic relations with Taiwan in 1979. Standing in front of the US Capitol at the inauguration, she said "Democracy is our common language and freedom is our common objective."

On Taiwan National Day 2021, Hsiao threw the ceremonial first pitch before a New York Mets game, celebrating the 16th annual Mets Taiwan Day.

On 17 August 2022, in the aftermath of then Speaker of the United States House of Representatives Nancy Pelosi's visit to Taiwan on 2–3 August, China blacklisted seven Taiwanese officials including Hsiao as "diehard "Taiwan independence" separatists" due to their support for Taiwan independence. The blacklist bans them from entering mainland China and the Special Administrative Regions of Hong Kong and Macau, and restricts them from working with Chinese officials. Chinese state-run tabloid Global Times labelled Hsiao and the six officials as "diehard secessionists".

In April 2023, Hsiao was sanctioned by China for the second time in aftermath of the meeting between President of Taiwan Tsai Ing-wen and then Speaker of the United States House of Representatives Kevin McCarthy in the United States. The second set of sanctions also include preventing investors and firms related to the sanctioned individuals from cooperating with mainland China organisations and individuals.

On 20 November 2023, Democratic Progressive Party (DPP) presidential candidate Lai Ching-te officially named Hsiao his vice presidential candidate for the 2024 presidential election. Hsiao was succeeded by Alexander Yui in her U.S. post at the end of the month.

== Vice presidency (2024–present) ==
In January 2024, Lai and Hsiao were elected president and vice president in the DPP's third consecutive presidential victory. She made her first foreign trip as vice president-elect in March, visiting the United States and later the Czech Republic, prompting strong opposition from China, which labeled her a "diehard Taiwan independence separatist." During her visit to Prague, Czech Republic, a car from the PRC embassy was stopped for tailing her convoy, leading to an investigation. She was being followed by a diplomat from the Embassy of China who had ignored traffic signs and almost caused a car accident. The diplomat was arrested, and the Czech Ministry of Foreign Affairs summoned the Chinese ambassador. Pavel Fischer, chairman of the Czech Senate's Foreign Affairs Committee, called for him to be expelled citing violations of the Vienna Convention on Diplomatic Relations. In June 2025, the Czech Military Intelligence said that altercation had been planned by the Chinese embassy, which had continuously monitored and tracked Hsiao and intended to intimidate her. The Military Intelligence stated that such infiltration operations by the People's Republic of China were unprecedented in Europe. The Inter-Parliamentary Alliance on China (IPAC) issued a statement condemning the act.

In May 2024, she advocated for Taiwan's participation in the World Health Assembly during events in Taipei. In August, China's Taiwan Affairs Office added a new section to its website, listing 10 Taiwanese politicians and officials including Hsiao as "die-hard Taiwanese independence separatists." In response, Taiwan's Mainland Affairs Council criticized the move as hindering positive exchanges between the two sides.

In November 2025, Hsiao addressed the Inter-Parliamentary Alliance on China and European Parliament in Brussels. This marked the first time Taiwan had participated in an IPAC summit with full membership, and the first speech by a Taiwanese vice president at the European Parliament.

== Personal life ==
Hsiao maintains ties with the Presbyterian Church of Taiwan.

In November 2000, The Journalist, a local tabloid magazine, wrongly claimed to have been told by Vice President Annette Lu that Hsiao was having an affair with President Chen. No evidence supported the false claim, and Lu sued the magazine for libel in civil court. The magazine was eventually ordered to apologize and issue corrections admitting it had fabricated the story.

During her political career, Hsiao and fellow legislators Cheng Li-chun and Chiu Yi-ying gained the nickname "the S.H.E of the DPP." Hsiao has been a long-time supporter of gender equality and LGBT rights in Taiwan.

== Honors ==
- Order of Brilliant Star with Grand Cordon (Taiwan, 2024)

== Notes and references ==
=== References ===
Diplomatic posts
Preceded by Stanley Kao	Taiwanese Representative to the United States; 2020–2023	Succeeded by Alexander Yui
Party political offices
Preceded by Lai Ching-te	DPP nominee for Vice President of the Republic of China; 2024	Most recent
Political offices
Preceded by Lai Ching-te	Vice President of the Republic of China; 2024–present	Incumbent
