= Italy–Taiwan relations =

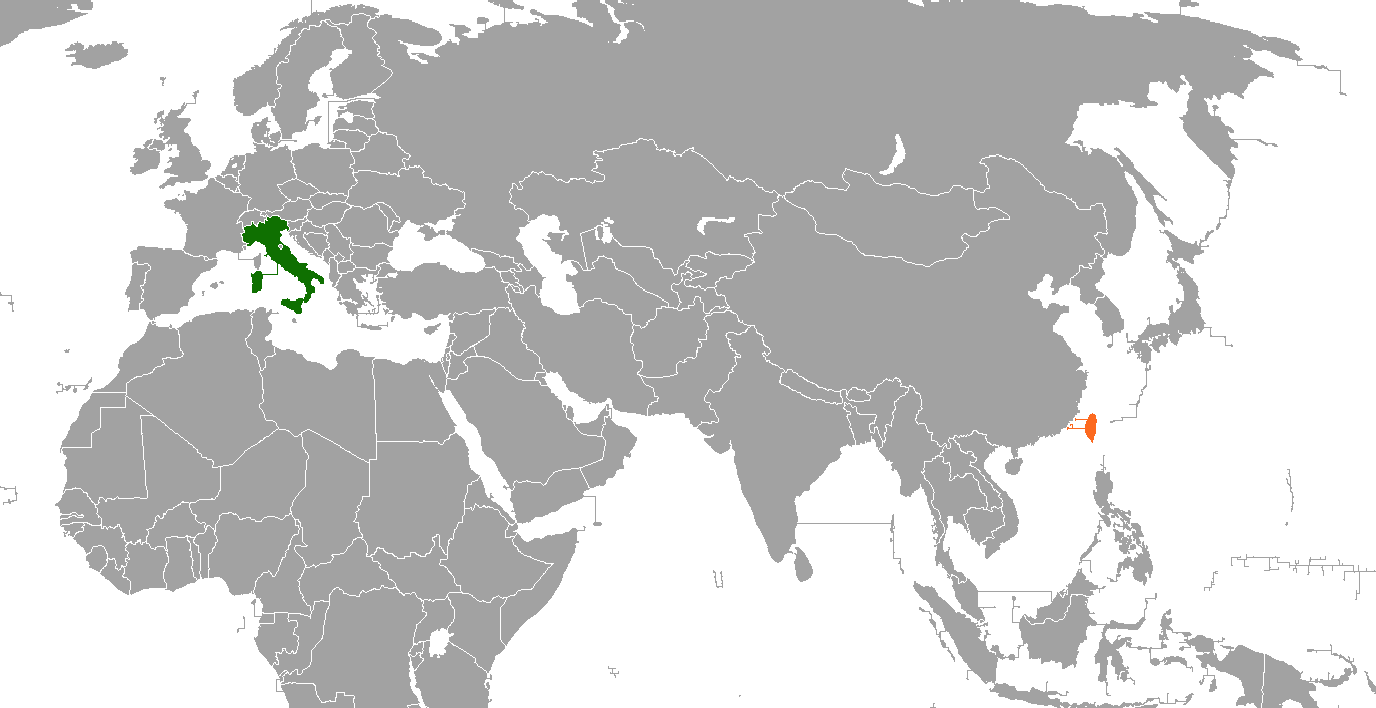
- Italy: Taiwan

Diplomatic mission
- Italian Economic, Trade and Cultural Promotion Office in Taipei: Taipei Representative Office in Italy

The bilateral relations between Italy and the Republic of China (Taiwan) began with official diplomatic relations from 1913 to 1941 and from 1944 to 1970, but these were interrupted by World War II. Since 6 November 1970, Italy has recognized the People's Republic of China under the "One China policy," and thus maintains relations with Taiwan through unofficial channels.

== Trade links ==
Despite the absence of diplomatic relations, trade links between Italy and Taiwan accounted for US$4.13 billion in 2014, with Italy being Taiwan's fifth largest trading partner in Europe. Approximately 40 Taiwanese companies had investments in Italy worth US$322 million in 2011. In 2015, the Chamber of Deputies, the lower house of the Italian Parliament, passed a bill on avoiding double taxation with Taiwan. An agreement to that effect was completed in 2016.

== Representative offices ==
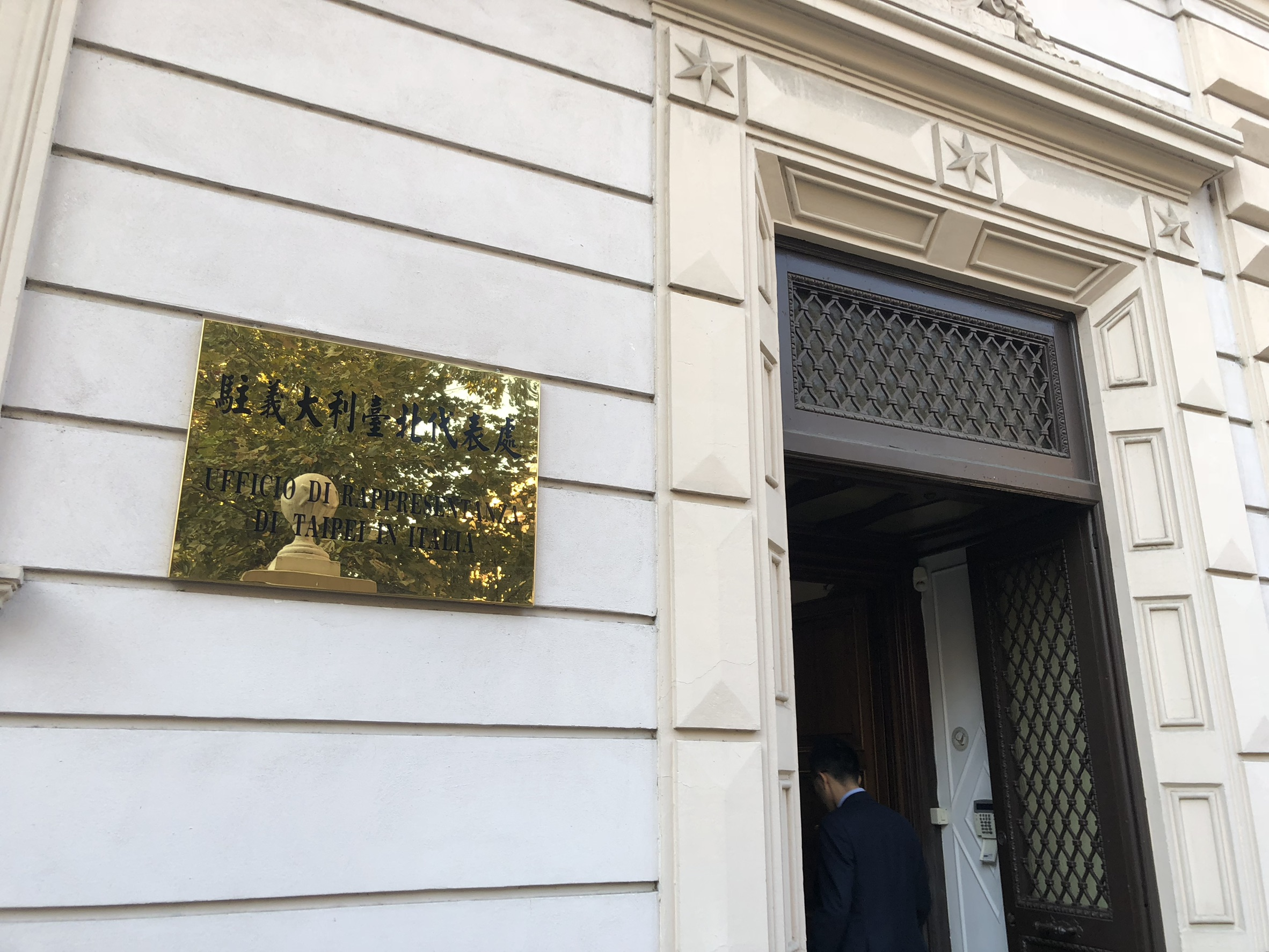
Taipei Representative Office in Italy

Taiwan is represented by the Taipei Representative Office in Rome. This also has responsibility for San Marino, Malta, Albania and Macedonia. This was established in 1990 as the Associazione Economica e Culturale di Taipei, before adopting its present name in 1996.

Another body, based in Milan, known as Centro Commerciale Per L'Estremo Oriente, had previously been established as a trade office in the early 1970s. This is now known as the "Taiwan Trade Center", operated by the Taiwan External Trade Development Council.

Similarly, Italy is represented by the Italian Economic, Trade and Cultural Promotion Office in Taipei. It was established in its present form in 1995. It was originally established in 1989 as the "Italian Trade and Economic Center". Arrangements for the opening of the office were made through San Shin Trading Ltd., the local agent for Fiat cars in Taiwan.

In 1992, the Office was renamed the "Italian Trade Promotion Office". In that year, it also began issuing visas. Previously, visa applications were forwarded to the Italian Consulate General in Hong Kong. In contrast to other countries, during the SARS crisis in 2003, Italy did not impose travel restrictions or quarantines on Taiwan tourists, with the Italian Economic, Trade and Cultural Promotion Office continuing to issue visas as normal.

== History ==
Italy attempting to purchase Taiwan in the 1880s, and it appears such a transaction negotiated never materialized. During the Japanese rule of Taiwan, Japan and Italy had diplomatic relations.

Until 1970, the Republic of China (Taiwan) was represented by an embassy in Rome and a consulate-general in Milan. This was separate from the Embassy of the Republic of China to the Holy See, which, while located in Italian territory, remains accredited to the Vatican City. This led to confusion in 1989 following the Tiananmen Square protests in Beijing, when Italians protested outside the embassy, believing it to be that of the People's Republic of China.

Taiwan's China Airlines began flights between Taipei and Rome in 1995, which became a codeshare service with Alitalia in 2003.

In 2005, then President Chen Shui-bian was given permission to enter Italy to attend the funeral of Pope John Paul II, travelling on a China Airlines charter flight.

In 2014, Taiwan decided not to participate in Expo 2015 in Milan after the Italian government proposed that it be represented as a corporate entity rather than as a country.

In 2020 Taiwan donated equipment and supplies to Italy as part of its medical diplomacy in response to the COVID-19 pandemic. Equipment donated included 15 respirators donated to who hospitals in the hard hit Lombardy region in April 2020.

In September 2024, the Foreign Affairs Committee of the Italian Chamber of Deputies unanimously approved a resolution supporting Taiwan's participation in the United Nations system. In January 2025, Marco Osnato led a cross-party delegation of Italian lawmakers to Taiwan and met with Taiwanese official Shen You-chung.

== Diplomats ==
=== Taiwan's Representatives to Italy ===
- Edward Tzu-Yu Wu (26 Dec 1990 – 3 Mar 1993)
- Joe Hung (1 Apr 1993 – 18 Aug 2000)
- Stanley Kao (25 May 2013 – 5 Jun 2016)
- Sing-Ying Lee (31 Jul 2018 – Jan 2023)
- Vincent Y.C. Tsai (Jan 2023 – Incumbent）

== See also ==
- Foreign relations of Italy
- Foreign relations of Taiwan
- T75 pistol
