= Tsai Pi-chung =

Taiwanese politician

- 蔡碧仲
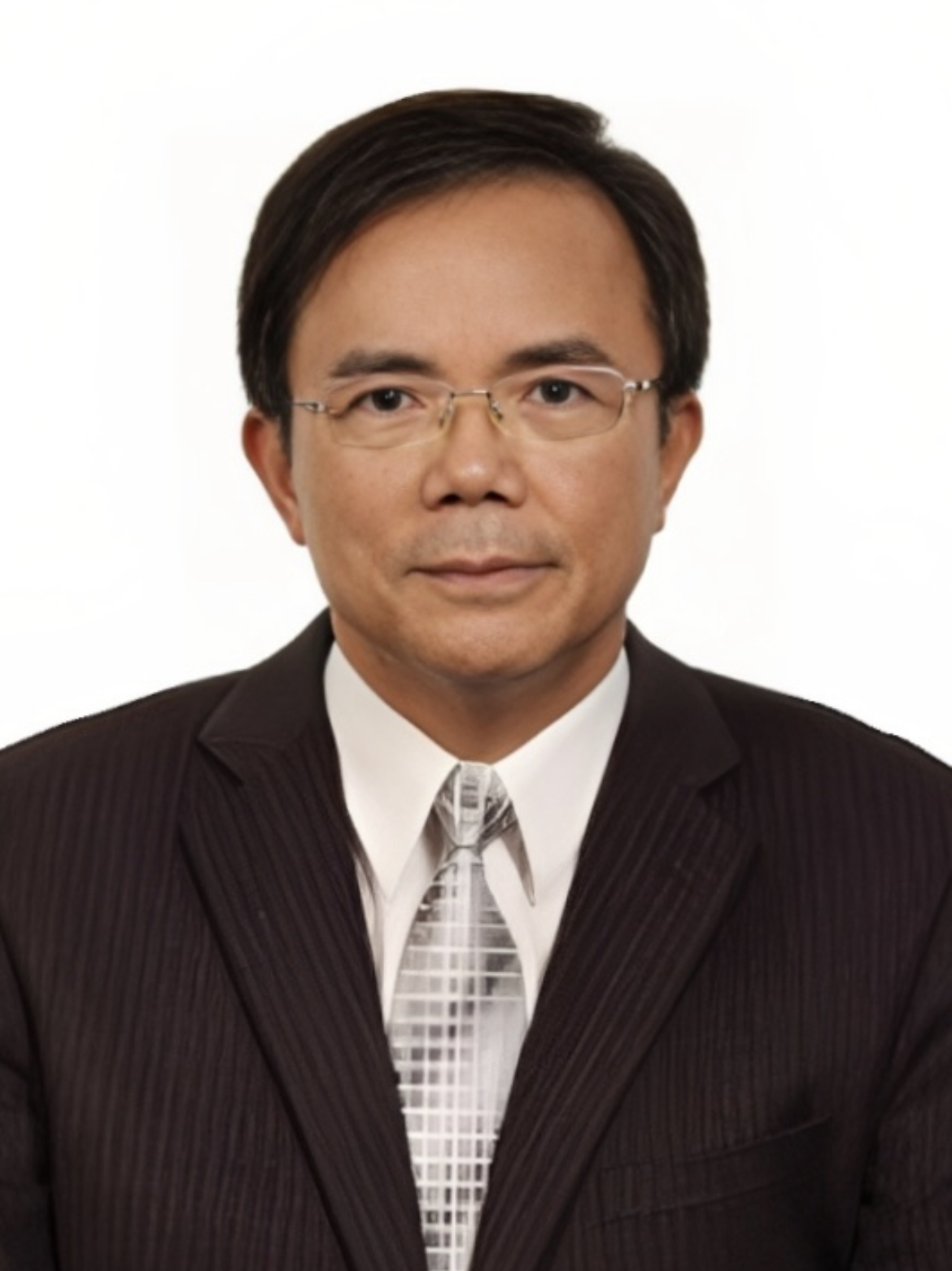
- Official portrait, 2017

Political Deputy Minister of Justice
- In office 25 December 2018 – 20 May 2024 Serving with Chen Ming-tang
- Minister: Tsai Ching-hsiang
- Succeeded by: Huang Shih-chieh
- In office 21 November 2016 – 17 September 2018
- Minister: Chiu Tai-san; Tsai Ching-hsiang

Acting Magistrate of Hualien
- In office 17 September 2018 – 25 December 2018
- Appointed by: William Lai
- Preceded by: Fu Kun-chi
- Succeeded by: Hsu Chen-wei

Personal details
- Born: September 1958 (age 67) Yuanchang, Yunlin, Taiwan
- Spouse: Huang Shu-ying
- Education: National Chengchi University (LLB)

Tsai Pi-chung (Chinese: 蔡碧仲; pinyin: Cài Bìzhòng) is a Taiwanese politician. He took office as acting Hualien County Magistrate on 17 September 2018 until 25 December 2018. Prior to succeeding Fu Kun-chi in the position, Tsai served as Deputy Minister of Justice. He studied law at National Chengchi University and worked as a prosecutor in Penghu, Yunlin and Chiayi.
