= Fu Kun-chi =

Taiwanese politician (born 1962)

Fu Kun-chi MLY
- 傅崐萁
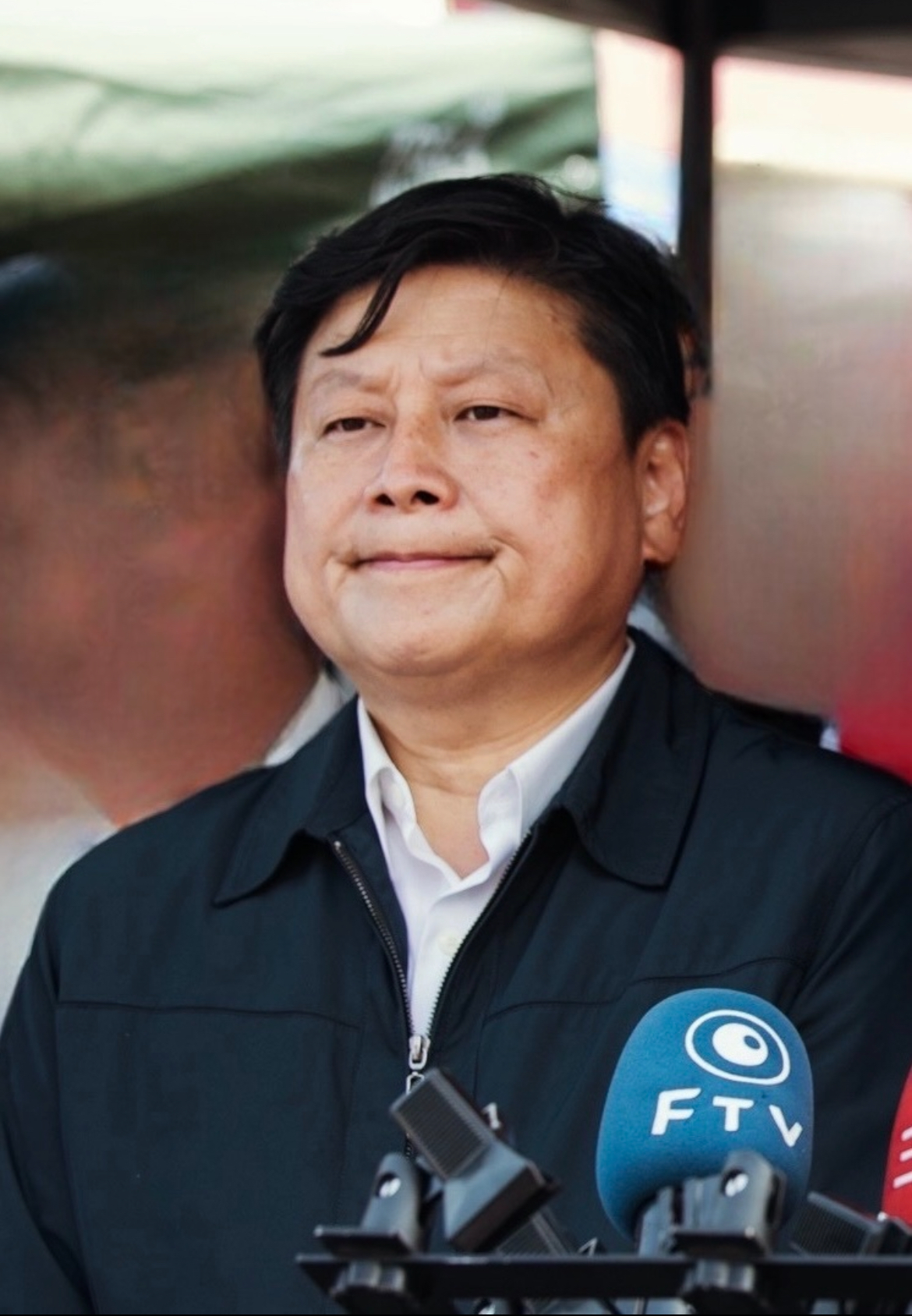
- Fu in 2024

Majority Leader of the Legislative Yuan
- Incumbent
- Assumed office 1 February 2024
- President: Han Kuo-yu
- Deputy: Hung Mong-kai; Lin Szu-ming; Wang Hung-wei; Lo Chih-chiang
- Preceded by: Ker Chien-ming

Spouse of the Magistrate of Hualien
- Current
- Assumed role 25 December 2018
- Magistrate: Hsu Chen-wei
- Preceded by: Huang Shu-ying

12th Magistrate of Hualien
- In office 20 December 2009 – 12 September 2018
- Preceded by: Hsieh Shen-shan
- Succeeded by: Tsai Pi-chung (a.i.)

Member of the Legislative Yuan
- Incumbent
- Assumed office 1 February 2020
- Preceded by: Hsiao Bi-khim
- Constituency: Hualien County
- In office 1 February 2002 – 20 December 2009
- Succeeded by: Wang Ting-son
- Constituency: Hualien County

Personal details
- Born: 8 May 1962 (age 64) Taichung, Taiwan
- Party: Kuomintang (2007–2009, since 2021)
- Other political affiliations: People First Party (2000–2007)
- Spouse(s): Hsu Chen-wei (m. 2009, divorced) Hsu Chen-wei (m. 2016)
- Education: Tamkang University (BS, MA); National Dong Hwa University (MPA)

Fu Kun-chi (Chinese: 傅崐萁; pinyin: Fù Kūnqí; Wade–Giles: Fu^{4} Kʻun^{1}-chʻi^{2}; born 8 May 1962) is a Taiwanese politician who serves as a member of the Legislative Yuan. He was a member from 2002 to 2009, when he assumed the Hualien County magistracy. In September 2018, Fu was removed from the latter office, as the Supreme Court issued its final ruling on charges of insider trading against him, outstanding since 2005. Fu was re-elected to the Legislative Yuan in 2020. On 14 May 2020, he was convicted of illegal stock speculation and sentenced to two years and ten months in prison. His wife is the Hualien County Magistrate since 2018, Hsu Chen-wei.

== Early life and education ==
Fu was born on 8 May 1962 in Taichung, Taiwan. His mother, Liu Man-lan (劉滿蘭), was a housewife. His father, Fu Chao-lin (傅兆林), was a civil engineer who graduated first in his class from National Kaohsiung University of Science and Technology and studied in Japan. Chao-lin worked for the Taiwan Provincial Government and oversaw the construction of roads and bridges in eastern Taiwan. In 1977, the family relocated to Hualien County following Chao-lin's reassignment to the region to supervise public infrastructure projects.

Fu initially attended Dongshan High School (東山高中) in Taipei, where he was a second-year student in 1980, before transferring to National Hualien Senior High School. He then graduated from Tamkang University with a bachelor's degree in transportation engineering. As an undergraduate, he worked as a waiter and tutor, and began working as a real estate broker in his sophomore year. During his junior year, Fu also began investing in the stock market after receiving encouragement from an investor. He also served as a class representative.

While serving as a legislator, Fu earned a master's degree in Chinese studies from Tamkang University in 2007. He wrote a 121-page master's thesis titled, A Comparison of Military Strength Across the Taiwan Strait: A Study of Weapons Projection Capabilities (兩岸國防軍力實力對比－投射武器軍力之比較研究).

Fu later studied public administration at National Dong Hwa University, and afterwards he began doctoral studies in law at Jinan University. In February 2025, Fu said that he had left Jinan University without completing a degree.

== Political career ==
Fu served in the Legislative Yuan from 2002 to 2009. Fu assumed the position of Magistrate of Hualien County starting 20 December 2009 after winning the 2009 Hualien County magistrate election on 5 December 2009 as an independent candidate. He was reelected for the second term as magistrate after winning the 2014 Hualien County magistrate election on 29 November 2014 as an independent candidate.

In a 2015 rally reportedly attended in tens of thousands, Fu declared he was against registering same-sex marriages in Hualien county.

n accordance with Article 56, Subparagraph 3 of the Local Government Act (地方制度法), Deputy Commissioner Tsai Yun-huang (蔡運煌) and all county government employees appointed by Fu are to be dismissed as well,

In 2016, after Fu was convicted of insider trading, his magistrate appointment was removed and deputy commissioner Tsai Yun-huang and other appointed county government employees by Fu were also removed from office, and the interior ministry selected Tsai Pi-chung as acting magistrate.

2014 Hualien County Magistrate Election Result
No.	Candidate	Party	Votes	Percentage
1	Fu Kun-chi	Independent	89,048	56.53%
2	Hsu Chen-wei	Independent	5,436	3.45%
3	Huang Shih-peng (黄師鵬)	Independent	2,369	1.50%
4	Ke Tsi-hai (柯賜海)	Independent	14,954	9.49%
5	Chu Kuo-hua (朱國華)	Independent	2,218	1.41%
6	Tsai Chi-ta (蔡啟塔)	KMT	43,504	27.62%

=== 2016 Mainland China visit ===
In September 2016, Fu visited Beijing with another seven magistrates and mayors from Taiwan, which were Hsu Yao-chang (Magistrate of Miaoli County), Chiu Ching-chun (Magistrate of Hsinchu County), Liu Cheng-ying (Magistrate of Lienchiang County), Yeh Hui-ching (Deputy Mayor of New Taipei City), Chen Chin-hu (Deputy Magistrate of Taitung County), Lin Ming-chen (Magistrate of Nantou County) and Wu Cherng-dean (Deputy Magistrate of Kinmen County). Their visit was aimed to reset and restart cross-strait relations after President Tsai Ing-wen took office on 20 May 2016. The eight local leaders reiterated their support of One-China policy under the 1992 consensus. They met with Taiwan Affairs Office Head Zhang Zhijun and Chairperson of the Chinese People's Political Consultative Conference Yu Zhengsheng.

=== Return to the legislature ===
Fu ran as an independent in the Hualien County Constituency he represented from 2002 to 2009, and defeated sitting legislator Hsiao Bi-khim in the 2020 legislative election. Fu was reelected to the Legislative Yuan in 2024, and considered a run for the speakership. Instead, Fu was named the Kuomintang's legislative caucus convener.

In July 2025, Fu faced a recall vote, alongside 23 other members of the Legislative Yuan, as a result of the massive petition known as the "Great Recall". The vote was framed by recall advocates as a push against the Chinese Communist Party and the People's Republic of China. Fu's recall passed the legal threshold but failed to reach the number of votes needed to unseat him.

== Corruption convictions ==
=== Appointing former wife as deputy ===
On 18 December 2009, Fu divorced his wife Hsu Chen-wei and on 20 December, appointed her as the deputy county magistrate when he took office as Magistrate of Hualien County. Two days later, Hsu's appointment was withdrawn by the Ministry of the Interior on 22 December 2009 as the ministry deemed the divorce as a political fake marriage and the appointment was a conflict of interest with appointing a close relation to a government office. In March 2010, Fu was fined NT$1 million by the Control Yuan for conflict of interest.

=== Illegal speculation of stocks ===
In 1997, Taipei District Prosecutors Office began investigation of illegal speculation of Taiwan Pineapple Group's stocks and in 2000, Taipei District Prosecutors Office charged 21 investors, inclusive of Fu, for illegal speculation of Taiwan Pineapple Group's stocks. Fu was found guilty and charged but repeatedly appealed and filed for retrials. While Fu was found not involved in the Taiwan Pineapple Group speculation, he was found guilty of involvement in market manipulation of four other companies, Yu Cheng Construction, Ever Fortune Industrial, Hualon and Kai Chu Ceramic with the same group and also engaging in insider trading, illegally profiting hundreds of millions of NT dollars.

In 2013, Fu was found guilty of insider trading, stock price manipulation and other related charges, as well as contravening the Securities and Exchange Act (證券交易法). He was sentenced to a three-year jail term by the High Court after citing provisions of the Criminal Speedy Trial Act (刑事妥速審判法). In 2019, Fu appeal against his initial charges but the High Court overruled his appeal but reduced his sentence by two months to two years and 10 months from his original sentence. Upon hearing the appeal in May 2020, the Supreme Court decided to uphold the High Court's 2019 ruling, without suspending Fu's civil rights, which permitted Fu to retain his seat in the Legislative Yuan.

=== Insider trading ===
In 2005, Fu was charged with insider trading dating back to 2003. The Taichung District Court ruled in 2008 that he was to pay a NT$50 million fine and he was sentenced to a prison term of 54 months. The case was appealed to the High Court, and Supreme Court, which returned the case to the High Court. A 2016 High Court decision held that Fu was guilty and reduced his sentence to eight months' imprisonment. The Supreme Court refused another appeal in September 2018, and ruled that Fu must serve his eight-month sentence. Immediately after the court decision, the Ministry of the Interior removed Fu from the Hualien County magistracy. Fu began serving his sentence on 25 September 2018. In March 2019, it was reported that Fu's sentence had been reduced by one month on good behavior, which granted him early release on 24 April 2019.

=== Tax evasion ===
The Hualien District Prosecutors’ Office charged Fu with tax evasion in October 2017, regarding real estate sales. On 24 June 2020, the Taiwan High Court extended Fu's prison sentence to a total of 46 months, in decisions regarding the stock manipulation cases against him, as well as his divorce from Hsu Chen-wei.

== Personal life ==
Fu and Hsu divorced in 2009. They remarried in 2016.
