= Anti-Money Laundering Office, Executive Yuan =

Government agency in Taiwan

- 行政院洗錢防制辦公室
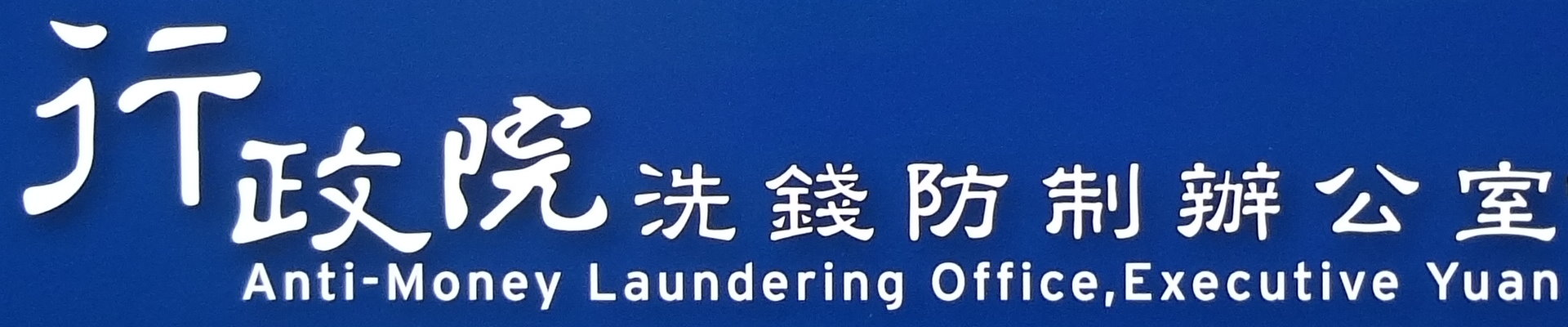

Agency overview
- Formed: 16 March 2017
- Jurisdiction: Republic of China
- Headquarters: Zhongzheng, Taipei, Taiwan; 25°02′13.5″N 121°31′18.0″E
- Agency executive: Tsai Pi-chung, Director
- Website: Official website

Anti-Money Laundering Office, Executive Yuan (AMLO; traditional Chinese: 行政院洗錢防制辦公室; simplified Chinese: 行政院洗钱防制办公室; pinyin: Xíngzhèng Yuàn Xǐqián Fángzhì Bàngōngshì) is an agency of the Government of the Republic of China to deal with money laundering matters in Executive Yuan.

== History ==
The office was established on 16 March 2017, five years after the second round of an Asia/Pacific Group on Money Laundering performance review stated that Taiwan's existing laws regarding money laundering did not conform to international standards. Premier Lin Chuan stated at the opening ceremony that the office will help build a more transparent and orderly financial environment in Taiwan. Deputy Minister of Justice Tsai Pi-chung was appointed as the office's first director.

== Directors ==
- Tsai Pi-chung (since 2017)

== See also ==
- Crime in Taiwan
