= Wang Ting-son =

Taiwanese politician

- 王廷升
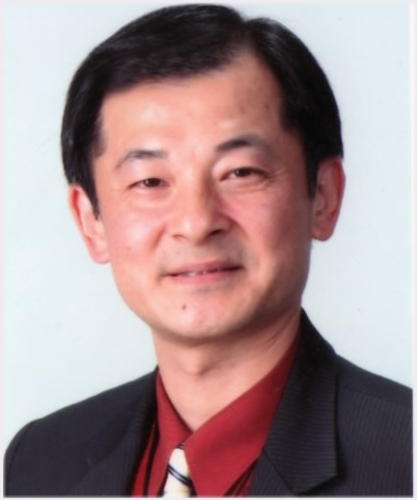
- Official portrait, 2012

Member of the Legislative Yuan
- In office 8 March 2010 – 31 January 2016
- Preceded by: Fu Kun-chi
- Succeeded by: Hsiao Bi-khim
- Constituency: Hualien County

Personal details
- Born: 8 May 1962 (age 64) Hualien County, Taiwan
- Party: Kuomintang
- Parent: Wang Ching-feng (father)
- Education: Soochow University (BS); George Washington University (MA, PhD)

Wang Ting-son (Chinese: 王廷升; pinyin: Wáng Tíngshēng; born 30 June 1965) or Timothy Wang is a Taiwanese politician and academic who served in the Legislative Yuan from 2010 to 2016.

== Early life and education ==
Wang was born in Hualien County, Taiwan, on May 8, 1962. His father, Wang Ching-feng, served as the magistrate of Hualien County from 1993 to 2001.

After high school, Wang studied mathematics at Soochow University and graduated with a bachelor's degree in commercial mathematics. He then completed graduate studies in the United States, earning a master's degree and a Ph.D. in international business from George Washington University in 1996. His doctoral dissertation was titled, "An analysis of characteristics and motivations related to Taiwanese manufacturing firms' decisions to invest in China".

After receiving his doctorate, Wang returned to Taiwan, joining the National Dong Hwa University faculty.

== Political career ==
Wang held several posts within the Kuomintang before he was nominated to contest a by-election scheduled for 27 February 2010, to replace outgoing legislator Fu Kun-chi. Ma Ying-jeou made several appearances at Wang's campaign events, as did King Pu-tsung. Wang faced Democratic Progressive Party candidate Hsiao Bi-khim and independent Shih Sheng-liang. Five days before the election, Wang led Hsiao by thirteen percentage points, and eventually defeated her by approximately six thousand votes, a margin that the Taipei Times considered "narrow" due to Fu Kun-chi's strong influence in Hualien. The Kuomintang renominated Wang for the 2012 legislative elections, and he retained the Hualien County district seat contested by DPP candidate Lie Kuen-cheng. Wang sought reelection to the legislature in 2016, but lost to Hsiao Bi-khim, his political opponent in 2010.
