= Iron vote =

Political concept of loyal voters

The "iron vote" is a political term for a voter that can be reliably counted on to vote for one party or another. This phrase was most notably used beginning as early as a decade ago in Asian democratic elections, specifically Taiwan: Taiwanese Chinese: 鐵票; pinyin: tiě piào. These usually include strong supporters of Taiwan independence or Chinese unification.

The Kuomintang (KMT) was defeated in 2000 elections by the loss of iron votes. The result shows that "iron vote" can only be taken as reference. People who strongly believe in their "iron vote" may have an unexpected outcome.

The same term is also used in Hong Kong, referring to strong supporters of the pro-democracy camp or the pro-Beijing camp.

A related term in United States politics is yellow dog Democrat. The opposite is a swing voter.

== See also ==
- Iron rice bowl
- Safe seat
- Elections in Taiwan
