= Wang Ching-feng (magistrate) =

Taiwanese politician (1933–2024)

Wang Ching-feng (Chinese: 王慶豐; 1933 – 25 October 2024) was a Taiwanese politician.

== Life and career ==
Wang Ching-feng sat on the Hualien County Council and was its speaker. Wang, a member of the Kuomintang, defeated Chen Yung-hsing, the Democratic Progressive Party candidate, in the 1993 Hualien County magisterial election. Wang ran for reelection against the DPP's Michael You, in 1997. Infrastructure projects focusing on flood prevention took place during his first term, including the dredging and riverbank fortification of Hualien City's Meilun River. Meilun Hill was reclaimed and transformed into a park, which was completed in 1995. In his second term, Wang advocated for the Executive Yuan to distribute more money to local county governments. During his second term, Hualien was impacted by typhoons. In August 2000, Typhoon Bilis hit Hualien County, followed by Typhoon Toraji in July 2001. As Toraji caused landslides and floods, Wang attended the Kuomintang's sixteenth National Congress. Interior minister Chang Po-ya and legislator Chou Hsi-wei criticized Wang for his absence from Hualien. The Control Yuan began an investigation into Wang's actions in August 2001. In 2004, Wang took part in a committee convened by the Legislative Yuan to investigate the 3-19 shooting incident.

Wang Chin-feng's son Wang Ting-son served on the Legislative Yuan from 2010 to 2016.

Wang died on 25 October 2024, at the age of 91.
