= Hualien County Constituency =

Constituency of the Legislative Yuan of Taiwan

Coordinates: 23°46′15.2″N 121°23′07.6″E

Hualien County
- Single-member constituency for the Legislative Yuan
- District: Hualien County
- Electorate: 268,817

Current constituency
- Created: 2008
- Number of members: 1

Hualien County has been represented in the Legislative Yuan since 2008 by one at-large single-member constituency (Hualien County Constituency, Chinese: 花蓮縣選舉區; pinyin: Huālián Xiàn Xuǎnjǔ Qū).

== Current district ==
- Hualien County

== Legislators ==
Kuomintang Democratic Progressive Party Independent

Election	Hualien County
2008 7th	Fu Kun-chi (2008-2009)^{1}
2009 by-election	Wang Ting-son
2012 8th	Wang Ting-son
2016 9th	Hsiao Bi-khim
2020 10th	Fu Kun-chi
2024 11th	Fu Kun-chi

Fu Kun-chi resigned in 2009 after his election as Hualien County magistrate.

== Election results ==
=== 2024 ===
Legislative Election 2024: Hualien County Constituency
Party	Candidate	Votes	%	±%
Kuomintang	Fu Kun-chi	68,786	53.79	
DPP	Chang Mei Hui	51,732	40.45	−0.08
Independent	Hu Yuan Shen	6,493	5.08	
Institutional Island of Saving the World	Chou Yu-Mei	879	0.69	
Majority		17,054	13.33	
Total valid votes		127,890		
Kuomintang gain from Independent		Swing		

=== 2020 ===
2020 Legislative election
	Elected			Runner-up		
Incumbent	Candidate	Party	Votes (%)	Candidate	Party	Votes (%)
DPP; Hsiao Bi-khim	Fu Kun-chi	Independent	45.97%	Hsiao Bi-khim	DPP	40.53%

=== 2016 ===
2016 Legislative election
	Elected			Runner-up		
Incumbent	Candidate	Party	Votes (%)	Candidate	Party	Votes (%)
Kuomintang; Wang Ting-son	Hsiao Bi-khim	DPP	53.77%	Wang Ting-son	Kuomintang	43.58%
