= Robert W. Forden =

American diplomat

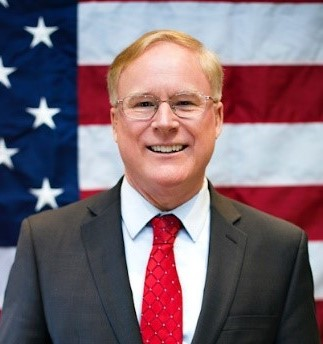

United States Chargé d'affaires to China
- In office October 5, 2020 – July 11, 2021
- President: Donald Trump; Joe Biden
- Preceded by: Terry Branstad as Ambassador
- Succeeded by: David Meale as Chargé d'affaires

Personal details
- Born: August 1959 (age 66) California, United States
- Spouse: Hui-chuan Chi
- Children: 3
- Education: University of California, Santa Cruz (B.A.); Fletcher School of Law and Diplomacy

Robert William Forden is an American diplomat who served as the United States' Chargé d'affaires to China from 2020 to 2021. He previously served as the deputy chief of mission to the American Institute in Taiwan and the deputy chief of mission to the Embassy of the United States in Beijing. He was President Joe Biden's nominee to be United States Ambassador to Cambodia, but the nomination expired on January 3, 2025 before the Senate Foreign Relations Committee could act on it.

== Early life and education ==
Forden was born in Southern California in August 1959. He earned a Bachelor of Arts in politics from the University of California, Santa Cruz, and a postgraduate degree from the Fletcher School of Law and Diplomacy in international trade and Asian diplomatic history.

== Career ==
Forden's experience in China stems from his time teaching English at universities in Shenyang and Beijing from 1981 to 1983. He has held a variety of diplomatic posts throughout his career, beginning with positions as an economic officer at the Embassy of the United States in Tel Aviv and Embassy of the United States in Hanoi. While in Hanoi, he worked to complete and implement a trade agreement between the United States and Vietnam. Forden served two stints at the U.S. Embassy in Beijing prior to his service as chargé d'affaires, from 1995 to 1998 and then again from 2007 to 2011.

In 2002, Forden took a position as the head of mission at the American Institute in Taiwan Kaohsiung Branch Office, where he served until 2005. He subsequently served as the deputy director of the State Department's China and Mongolia Affairs Office from 2005 to 2007. In 2015, Forden was named the 15th deputy director of the American Institute in Taiwan, a position he held until 2018.

Forden returned to Beijing in 2018 to serve as the United States' deputy chief of mission to China. In 2020, Terry Branstad, the United States ambassador to China, was asked to step down by President Donald Trump, so that Branstad could assist with Trump's presidential campaign. To replace him, Forden was appointed to the post of Chargé d'affaires.

=== Ambassador to Cambodia ===
On June 22, 2022, President Joe Biden nominated Forden to be the next ambassador to Cambodia. His nomination was returned to Biden on January 3, 2023, as no action was taken on it for the rest of the year.

President Biden renominated Forden the same day. Though nominated twice, Forden was never confirmed to be the US Ambassador to Cambodia and the second Trump administration on June 2, 2026 nominated Christopher Anderson to be the next Ambassador Extraordinary and Plenipotentiary of the United States of America to the Kingdom of Cambodia.

== Personal life ==
Forden is married to Hui-chuan Chi (紀惠娟), a native of Kaohsiung, Taiwan. They have three children. He speaks Mandarin Chinese and Vietnamese.

Diplomatic posts
Preceded by Terry Branstad as Ambassador	United States Chargé d'affaires to China; 2020–2021	Succeeded by David Meale
Preceded by Brent Christensen	Deputy director of the American Institute in Taiwan; 2015–2018	Succeeded by Raymond F. Greene
