= Oudkirk =

Oudkirk is a surname. Notable people with the surname include:

- Sandra Oudkirk (fl. 2019), American diplomat, Director of the American Institute in Taiwan
- Scott M. Oudkirk (born 1969), American diplomat, United States Ambassador to NATO
