= Kin W. Moy =

American diplomat (born 1966)

- 梅健華
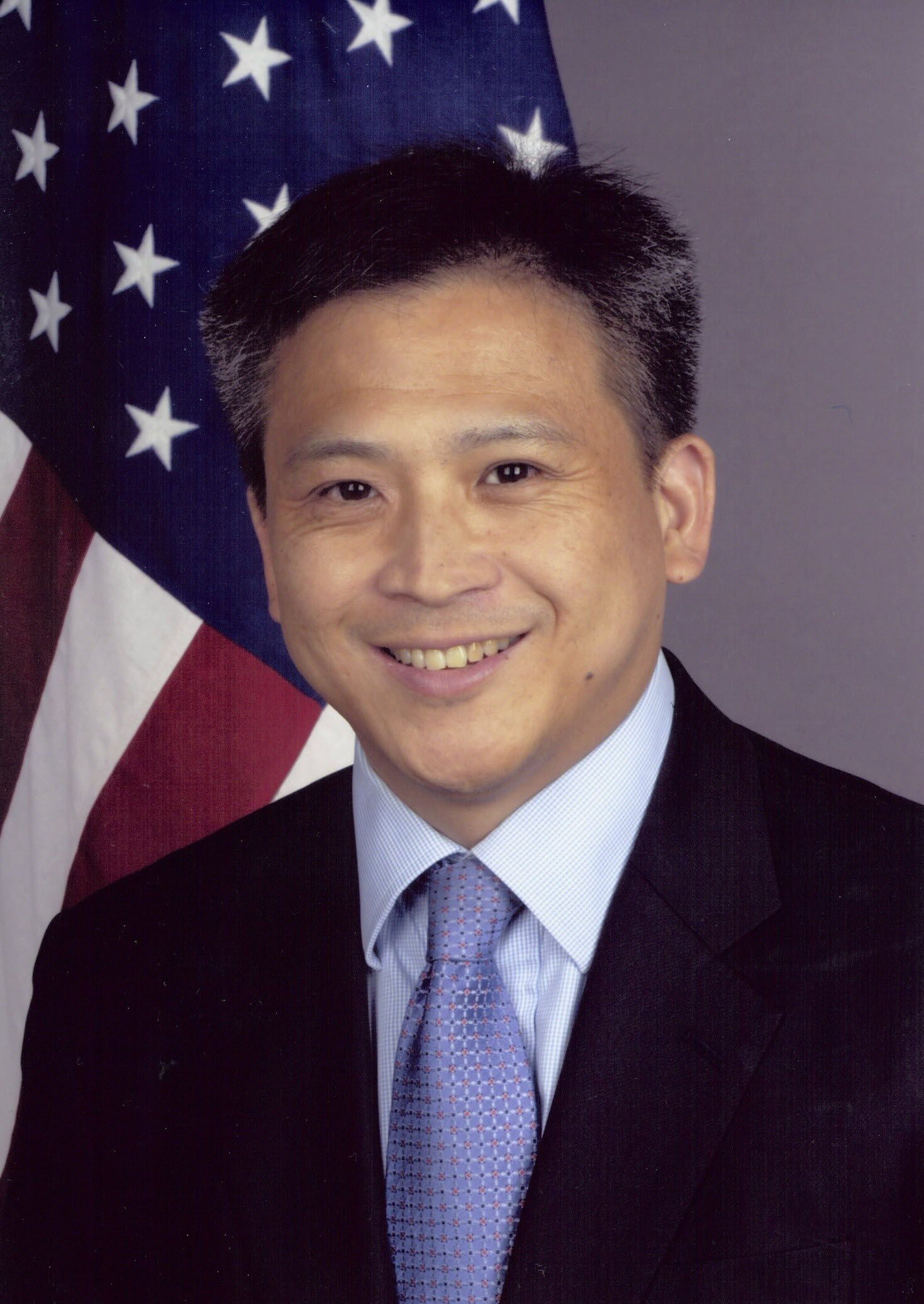
- Kin W. Moy in 2015

Assistant Secretary of State for Intelligence and Research
- Acting
- In office January 20, 2021 – June 15, 2021
- President: Joe Biden
- Preceded by: Ellen E. McCarthy
- Succeeded by: Brett M. Holmgren

Director of the American Institute in Taiwan
- In office 14 June 2015 – 12 June 2018
- President: Barack Obama; Donald Trump
- Preceded by: Christopher J. Marut
- Succeeded by: William Brent Christensen

Personal details
- Born: 1966 (age 59–60) British Hong Kong
- Spouse: Kathy Chen
- Education: Columbia University; University of Minnesota
- Occupation: Diplomat

Chinese name
- Traditional Chinese: 梅健華
- Simplified Chinese: 梅健华
Transcriptions
Standard Mandarin
- Hanyu Pinyin: Méi Jiànhuá
Yue: Cantonese
- Jyutping: Mui^{4} Gin^{6}-waa^{4}

Kin Wah Moy (born 1966) is an American diplomat and holds the diplomatic rank of career minister. He is the first Chinese-American to hold the post as director of the American Institute in Taiwan. Having served in the Department of State and several diplomatic outposts, he was the director of the American Institute in Taiwan, the de facto embassy of the United States in Taiwan, from 2015 to 2018.

== Early life ==
Moy was born in 1966 in British Hong Kong. His grandfather was from Taishan, Guangdong and lived in Chicago early in the twentieth century before returning to China. Moy moved to New York shortly after his birth and grew up in Minnesota.

== Education ==
Moy graduated from both Columbia University and the University of Minnesota.

== Career ==
Moy began working for the U.S. State Department in 1992. He served under six US secretaries of state, working as special assistant in the executive secretariat for Madeleine Albright, director of the executive secretariat staff for Condoleezza Rice, and deputy executive secretary for Hillary Clinton. He was deputy director of the Office of Maritime Southeast Asia and desk officer in the Office of Chinese and Mongolian Affairs.

In 2011, he was appointed deputy assistant secretary of state for East Asian and Pacific Affairs, in the Bureau of East Asian and Pacific Affairs, with responsibility for China, Mongolia, and Taiwan. In addition to his Washington assignments, Moy has served in the U.S. Embassy in Beijing, the U.S. Embassy in Seoul, and the U.S. Consulate in Busan.

Moy was considered one of the executors of President Barack Obama's "Asian Pivot" strategy. In 2015 he was appointed director of the American Institute in Taiwan and so became the de facto American ambassador to Taiwan in the absence of formal diplomatic relations. In his inaugural press conference, he stressed that the United States is Taiwan's closest ally. Shortly before leaving office in 2018, Moy was awarded the Order of Brilliant Star with Grand Cordon. He had served as the principal deputy assistant secretary in the Bureau of Intelligence and Research (INR).

On 21 April 2020, Moy was confirmed by the Senate to be career minister. On 20 January 2021, he was appointed as the acting assistant secretary of INR, a post he served until June 15, when he was appointed as the senior bureau official for the Bureau of East Asian and Pacific Affairs.

On 5 June 2024, Moy was nominated to be the U.S. Ambassador to Vietnam by President Joe Biden.

== Personal life ==
He graduated from Columbia University and the University of Minnesota and is a Mandarin and Cantonese speaker. Moy is married to Kathy Chen, a journalist who previously worked for the Wall Street Journal. They have four children—Andrew, Claire, Olivia and Amanda—and a Great Dane.

== Honors ==
- Order of Brilliant Star with Grand Cordon (2018) Republic of China
- Grand Medal of Diplomacy (2018) Republic of China

Diplomatic posts
Preceded by Christopher J. Marut	Director of the American Institute in Taiwan; 2015–2018	Succeeded by Brent Christensen
