= China Steel Corporation Headquarters =

Skyscraper in Cianjhen, Kaohsiung, Taiwan

- 中鋼集團總部大樓
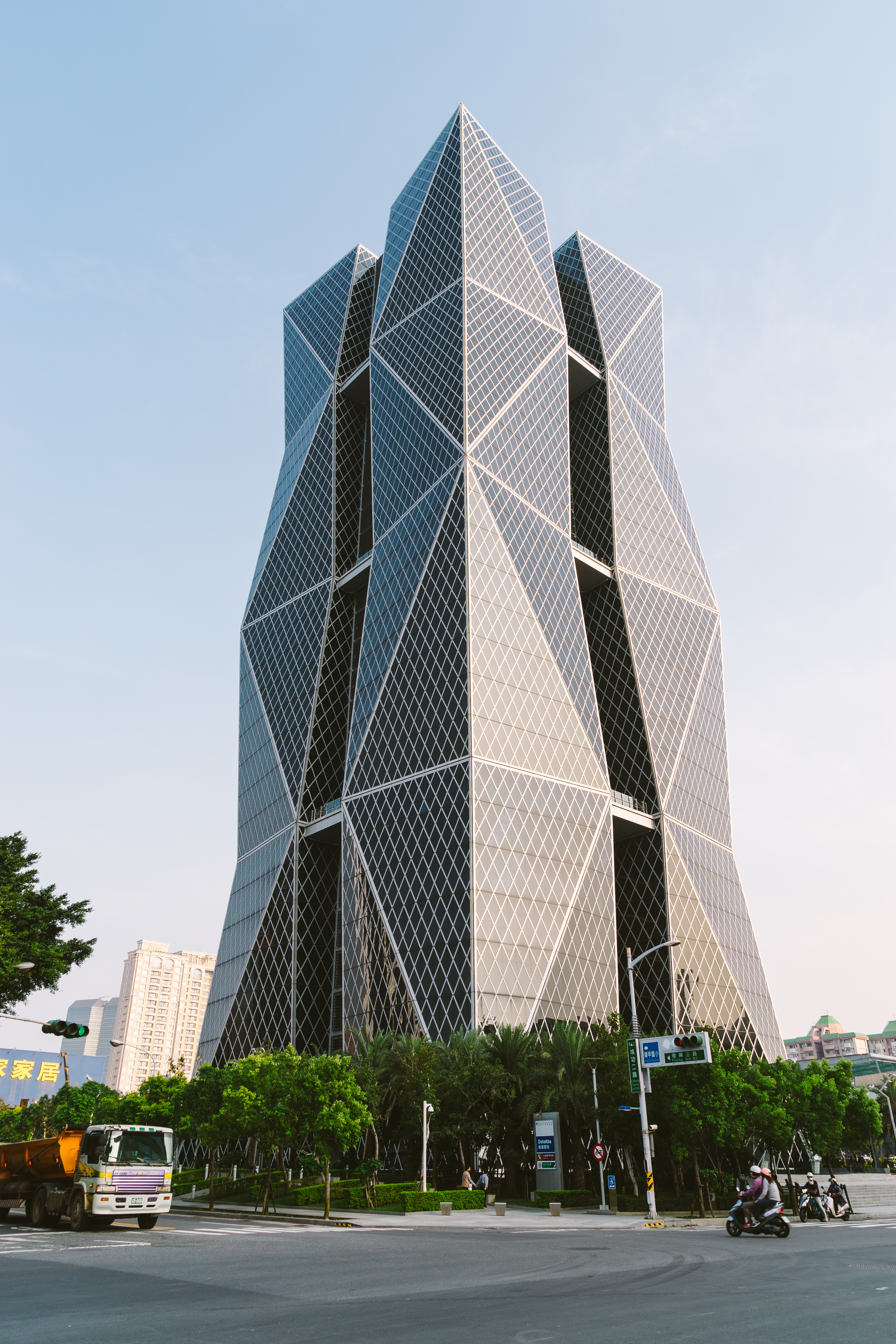
- Interactive map of the China Steel Corporation Headquarters area

General information
- Type: skyscraper
- Location: Cianjhen District, Kaohsiung, Taiwan
- Coordinates: 22°36′17.8″N 120°18′07.1″E
- Construction started: 2008
- Completed: 2012
- Owner: China Steel Corporation

Height
- Architectural: 135 m (443 ft)

Technical details
- Floor count: 29
- Floor area: 81,054 m^{2} (872,460 sq ft)

Design and construction
- Architect: Kris Yao
- Structural engineer: Evergreen Consulting Engineering

The China Steel Corporation Headquarters (Chinese: 中鋼集團總部大樓; pinyin: Zhōnggāngjítuán Zǒngbù Dàlóu) is a 29-story, 135 metres (443 ft) skyscraper office building in Cianjhen District, Kaohsiung, Taiwan. It houses the corporate headquarters of China Steel Corporation. As of February 2021, it is the 24th tallest building in Kaohsiung.

== History ==
The skyscraper was completed in 2012.

== Architecture ==
Designed by Taiwanese architect Kris Yao, the skyscraper has multi-faceted image with geometric 3D facade with a total floor area of 81,054 m^{2} (872,460 sq ft). It comprises four tubes, bound together by a central core. The facade changes every eight stories, creating outside terrace.

== Tenants ==
- China Steel Corporation
- American Institute in Taiwan Kaohsiung Branch Office
- MUFG Bank
- Deloitte Taiwan

== Transportation ==
The building is accessible within walking distance west of Shihjia Station of Kaohsiung MRT.

== See also ==
- List of tallest buildings in Taiwan
- List of tallest buildings in Kaohsiung
