= Therese Shaheen =

American diplomat

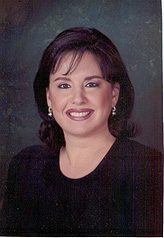
- 2015 by MCLTD
- Other names: 夏馨
- Education: Georgetown University (BSFS), Johns Hopkins University SAIS (MIPP)
- Occupations: Former diplomat, business executive
- Organization: American Institute in Taiwan
- Known for: First woman serving as Chair of the American Institute in Taiwan (2002-2004)

Therese Shaheen (Chinese: 夏馨) is an American businesswoman and entrepreneur who served as Chairman and Managing Director of the American Institute in Taiwan (AIT) from 2002 to 2004.

== Education ==
Shaheen earned her BSFS from Georgetown University School of Foreign Service and her Masters in International Public Policy from Johns Hopkins School of Advanced International Studies.

== Career ==
Shaheen founded an investment and technology development company focused on emerging economies in Asia in 1987. Over the years, her company has had offices in Seoul, Tokyo, Taipei, Beijing, and other Asian capitals. With the authorization of Taiwan Relations Act in 2002, she was tapped by President George W. Bush to serve as the first woman Chairman of the American Institute in Taiwan. She served during an important period in U.S.–PRC–Taiwan history, and was seen as a forceful representative of the United States.

After the Taiwan elections in March 2004, Shaheen resigned her position to return to private sector businesses. She has served as an Adjunct Fellow at the American Enterprise Institute, and remains a popular figure in Taiwan for her outspoken support of the island's commitment to freedom and self-government. Shaheen was an early observer of the challenges facing the PRC, speaking and writing while at AIT and since about how those challenges will limit PRC economic growth and other government objectives. Shaheen is a contributor to National Review and publishes and speaks frequently about economic issues in Asia. She resides in Washington DC with her husband Lawrence Di Rita.
