= Christopher J. Marut =

American diplomat

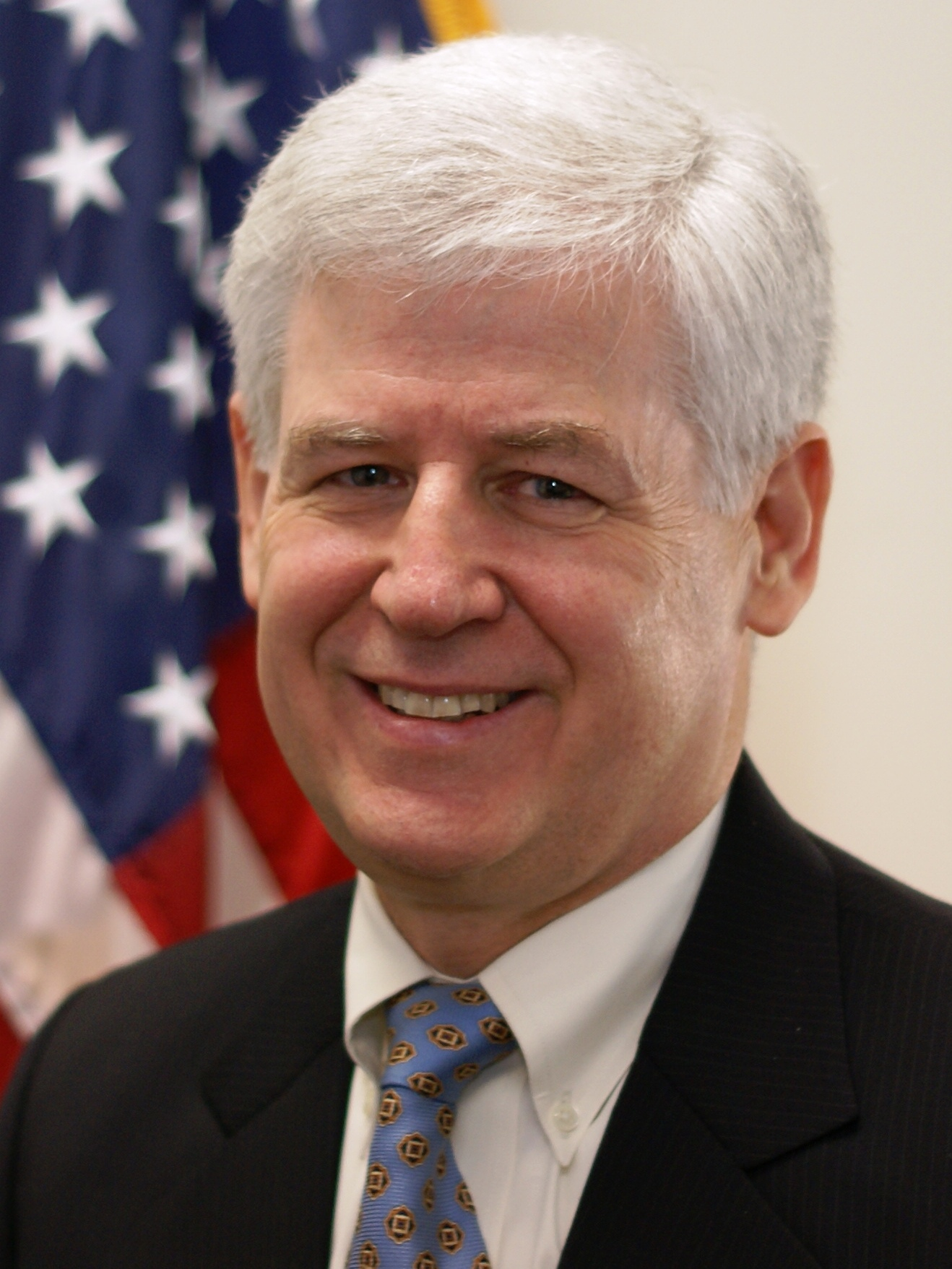
- Official portrait
- Born: Christopher John Marut; New Haven, Connecticut, United States
- Education: University of Notre Dame (B.B.A.); University of California, Berkeley (M.B.A.); Naval War College (M.A.)
- Occupation: Diplomat

Christopher J. Marut is an American diplomat who last served as the foreign policy advisor to Commander, United States Pacific Command (CDRUSPACOM), Admiral Harry B. Harris Jr. He also served as the director of the American Institute in Taiwan, the de facto embassy of the United States in Taiwan, from 2012 to 2015, and served as the acting consul general of the Consulate General of the United States, Hong Kong and Macau from 2009 to 2010.

== Early life and education ==
Marut was born in Connecticut in 1952; his father, Walter, was an engineer for Pratt & Whitney. Marut received a BBA from the University of Notre Dame in 1974, an MBA from the University of California, Berkeley, and an MA in National Security and Strategic Studies from the Naval War College in Newport, Rhode Island.

== Diplomatic career ==
Marut joined the Foreign Service in 1984; his early postings include the US Embassy in China, the US Consulate General in Hong Kong and Macau, the US Embassy in Malaysia, and a first assignment at the American Institute in Taiwan from 1986 to 1989, where he served as a Consular Officer as well as a Science and Technology Officer. Marut also had stateside postings at the State Department's Bureau of East Asian and Pacific Affairs (EAP), including an appointment as the Director of the Office of Regional and Security Policy.

In 2007, Marut was appointed deputy consul general of the US Consulate General in Hong Kong and Macau; he served as acting consul general from 2009 until a permanent appointment was made in 2010. He returned to the EAP in February 2010 as Director of the Office of Australia, New Zealand and Pacific Island Affairs.

In September 2012, Marut succeeded William Stanton as the Director of the American Institute in Taiwan; he completed his three-year term in June 2015. In recognition of his contributions to improved relations between the United States and Taiwan, Marut was awarded the Order of Brilliant Star by President Ma Ying-jeou of Taiwan.

In July 2015, Marut joined the staff of Commander, United States Pacific Command (CDRUSPACOM), Admiral Harry B. Harris Jr, as a foreign policy advisor.

== Family ==
Marut and wife Loretta have two children, Carolyn and Kenneth, both of whom were born in Taiwan during Marut's first assignment at the American Institute in Taiwan.

Diplomatic posts
Preceded by William Stanton	Director of the American Institute in Taiwan; 2012–2015	Succeeded by Kin Moy
Preceded by Joseph R. Donovan Jr.	United States Consul General to Hong Kong and Macau (acting); 2009–2010	Succeeded by Stephen M. Young
