= Kaohsiung Branch Office of the American Institute in Taiwan =

Division of the U.S. representative mission in Taiwan

Coordinates: 22.604961°N 120.301957°E

- 美國在台協會高雄分處

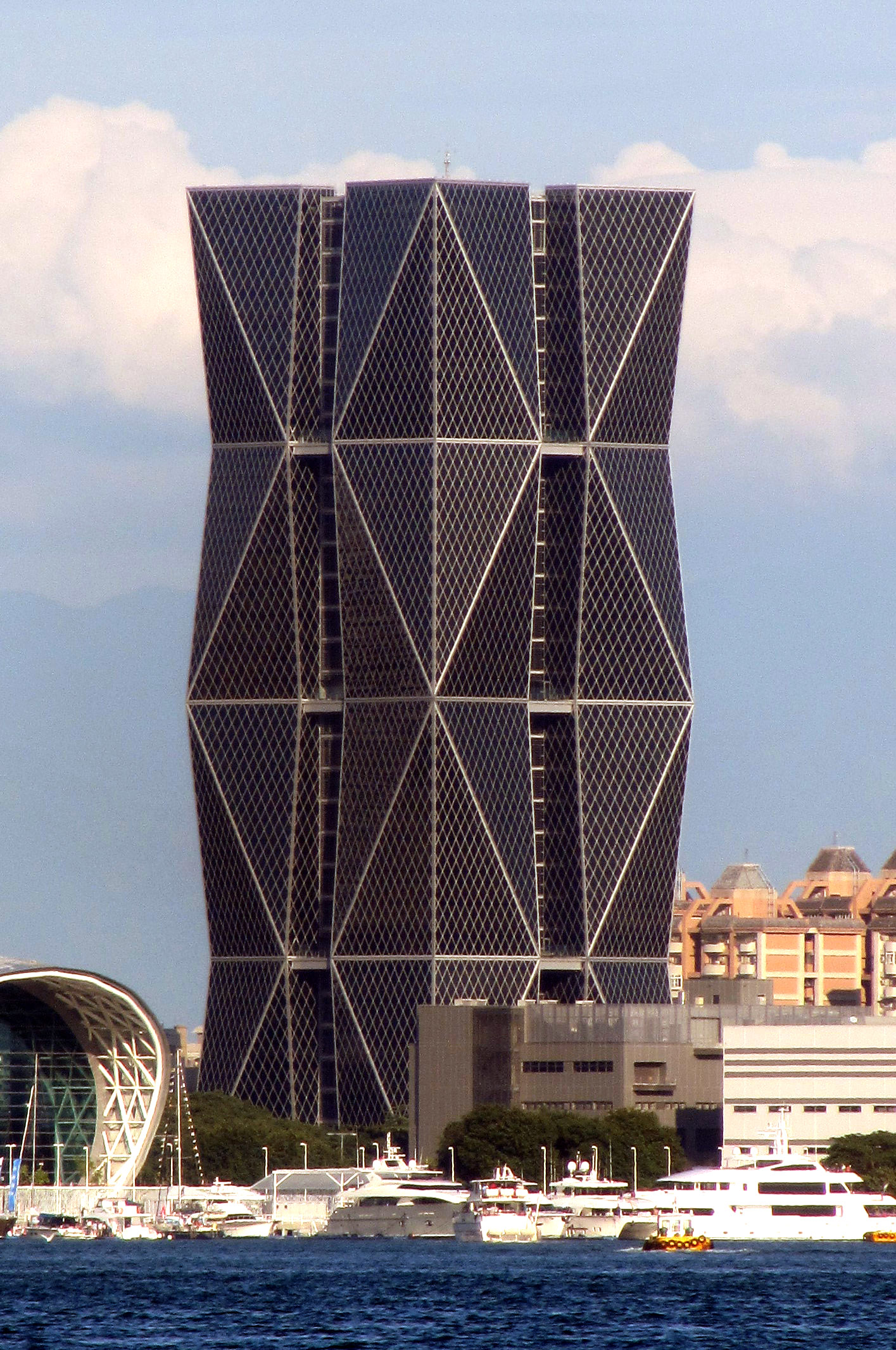
- Type: U.S. Government-Sponsored Non-profit Organization
- Location: 5F, No. 88, Chenggong 2nd Road, Cianjhen District, Kaohsiung 80661, Taiwan
- Region served: Southern Taiwan
- Services: de facto consulate
- Branch Chief: Lee Skluzak
- Website: https://www.ait.org.tw/kaohsiung/
- under authorization of the Taiwan Relations Act

The Kaohsiung Branch Office of the American Institute in Taiwan (AIT/K; Chinese: 美國在台協會高雄分處; pinyin: Měiguó Zài Tái Xiéhuì Gāoxióng Fēnchù) represents U.S. interests in southern Taiwan. It is located within the China Steel Corporation Headquarters building in Cianjin District, Kaohsiung, Taiwan.

Lee Skluzak assumed the position of Branch Chief of the American Institute in Taiwan's Kaohsiung Branch Office in July 2026.

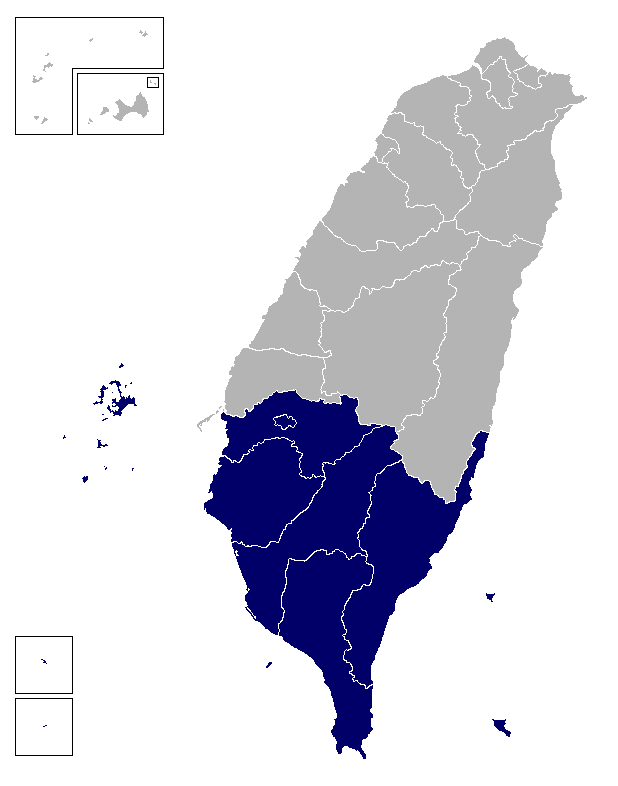
Consular district of the Branch Office in Kaohsiung covers Kaohsiung, Tainan, Chiayi City, Chiayi County, Pingtung County, Penghu County, and Taitung County

== History ==
In 1979, the Kaohsiung Branch Office of the American Institute in Taiwan was established. The purpose is to promote commercial, cultural and people-to-people ties between United States and the residents of southern Taiwan.

In 1986, the Kaohsiung Branch Office relocated to the Cathay Life Chungcheng Building on Chung Cheng 3rd Road, Sinsing District, Kaohsiung.

On August 8, 2014, the Kaohsiung Branch Office relocated again to their current location within the China Steel Corporation Headquarters building.

== Key Officers ==
The current and former key officers for the Kaohsiung Branch Office are as follows:

=== List of Branch Chiefs ===
Name	Term		Ref.
Name	Started	Ended	Ref.
Patrick J. Corcoran	1979	1980	
John J. Norris	1980	1980	
Donald E. Soergel	1980	1982	
John E. Lundin	1982	1983	
John A. Froebe, Jr.	1983	1985	
Syd Goldsmith	1985	1989	
Joseph R. Donovan Jr.	1989	1992	
Jeffrey Buczacki	1992	1995	
Thomas Biddick	1995	1996	
Darrell A. Jenks	1996	1999	
Stephen D. Dunn	1999	unknown (Note: Stephen D. Dunn was still Branch Office Chief as of 10 January 2001.)	
Thomas Biddick	unknown (Note: Thomas Biddick was already Branch Office Chief as of 27 March 2002.)	2002	
Robert W. Forden	2002	2005	
Tracy Thiele	2005	2008	
Christian Castro	2008	2011	
Gary Oba	2011	2014	
Robert C. DeWitt	2014	2017	
Matthew O'Connor	2017	2020	
Mason Yu	2020	2022	
Thomas T. Wong	2022	2023	
Neil Gibson	2023	2026	
Lee Skluzak	2026	current	

=== List of Deputy Branch Chiefs ===
Name	Term		Ref.
Name	Started	Ended	Ref.
Originally named as Chief of the Economic and Travel Services Sections
Tim Neely	unknown	1996	
Gary G. Oba	1996	2000	
Renamed to Economic and Consular Section Chief
David W. Seckler	2000	unknown (Note: David W. Seckler was still Economic and Consular Section Chief as of November 2002.)	
William B. Johnson	unknown (Note: William B. Johnson was already Economic and Consular Section Chief as of May 2004.)	2006	
Jean Pierre-Louis	2006	2008	
Renamed to Deputy Branch Chief
Mason Yu	2008	2011	
John Hartman	2011	2014	
Jason Chue	2014	2017	
Suzanne Wong	2017	2020	
Jack Lambert	2020	2023	
Samuel Hoffman	2023	2026	
Harry R. Thompson	2026	current	
