= Syd Goldsmith =

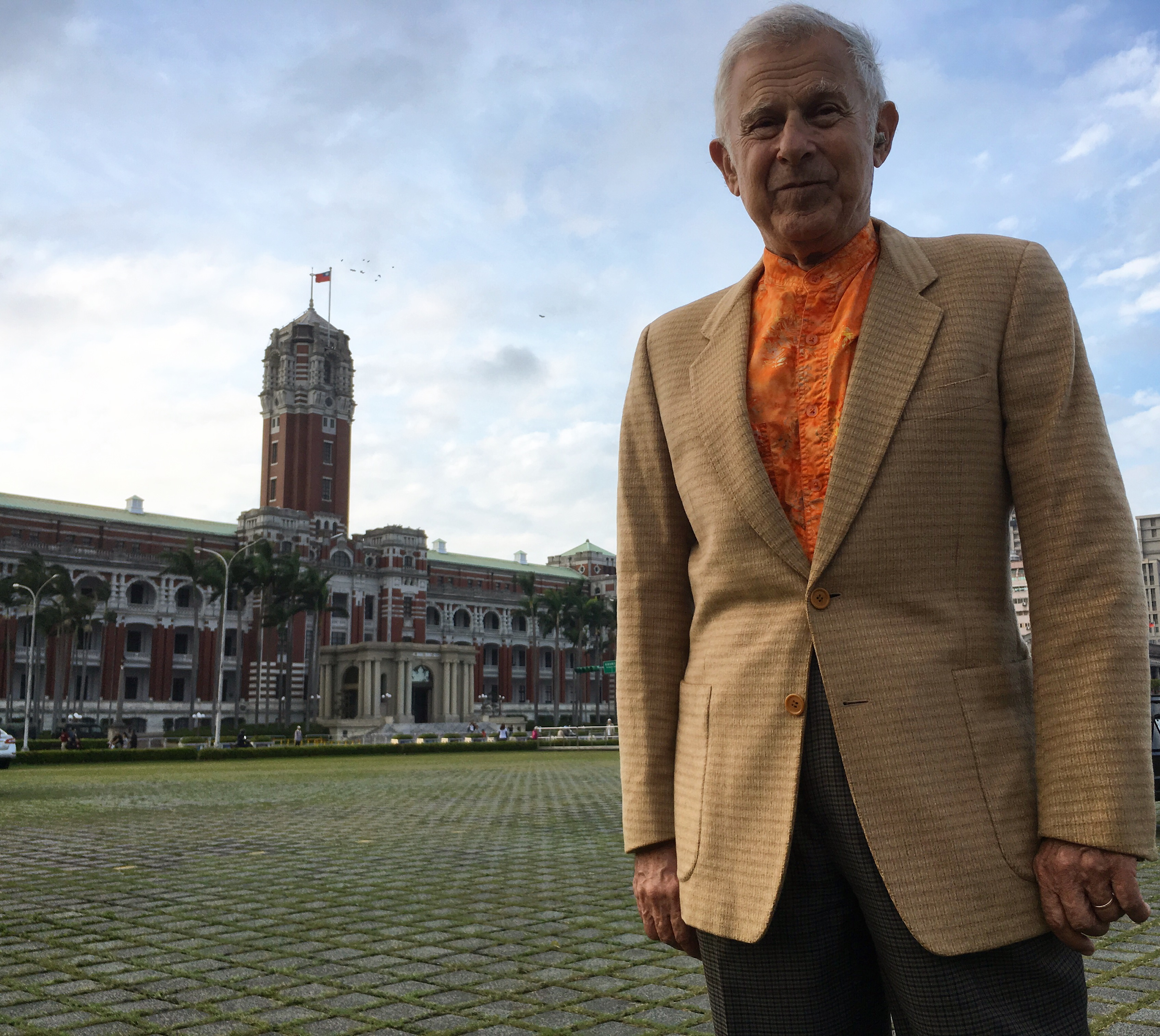
- Author Syd Goldsmith in 2016, Taipei, Taiwan.
- Born: July 27, 1938 (age 88); Washington, D.C., U.S.
- Education: Columbia University
- Occupation: Writer
- Website: www.sydgoldsmith.com

Syd Goldsmith (born July 27, 1938) is an American writer residing in Taiwan and a former diplomat. He has been featured in the South China Morning Post, on CNN, and by other media outlets. Goldsmith is the author of two fiction and one non-fiction books—Jade Phoenix, Two Musicians and The Wife Who Isn’t and Hong Kong on the Brink: An American Diplomat Relives 1967's Darkest Days — as well as numerous news op-ed articles.

== Early life ==
Goldsmith was born in Washington, D.C., and moved to Jamaica, Queens as a boy. He graduated from Montclair High School in 1956 and attended Columbia University.

== Career ==
=== Diplomat ===
As a diplomat, he served in the Consulate General of the United States, Hong Kong and Macau during the 1967 Hong Kong riots and the United States Embassy in Taipei, Taiwan from 1970 to 1974. Subsequently, from 1985 to 1989, he served as the director of the American Institute in Taiwan's Kaohsiung Branch Office, a de facto American consulate during Taiwan's transformation from a martial law dictatorship to the first ever Chinese democracy.

=== Writer ===
Goldsmith published his first novel, Jade Phoenix, in 2006. In the novel, a U.S. journalist and a Taiwanese businessman overcome huge cultural differences and become the closest of friends, only to discover that they both love the same woman. Although a novel, the work combined aspects of journalism, autobiography, and memoir as Goldsmith knows many of the historical persons who appear as characters in the book, both real and fictionalized. In an interview with the Taipei Times, Goldsmith said that he wrote the book "in a search for deeper understanding of the soul of Taiwan during the turbulent decade of the 1970s when everything changed." “Jade Phoenix” was a New Voices in Literature Award Finalist.

His second book, Two Musicians and The Wife Who Isn’t, published in 2012, explores the hearts and souls of three passionate people.

His third book, Hong Kong on the Brink: An American Diplomat Relives 1967’s Darkest Days, published in 2017, a critical and unsparing account of Goldsmith's experience during one of Hong Kong's deadliest periods, details “Hong Kong … simmering, plagued by communist-led riots and strikes, crippled transport, punishing water-rationing, takeover threats from Beijing and roadside bombs.” The South China Morning Post calls it “an informative, engaging read filled with vivid historical detail.”

== Person life ==
Goldsmith lives in Taipei, Taiwan.

== Books ==
- Jade Phoenix, 2006. (Selected as a “New Voices in Literature Award Finalist”)
- Two Musicians and The Wife Who Isn’t, 2012.
- Hong Kong on the Brink: An American Diplomat Relives 1967’s Darkest Days, 2017.
