= Thomas L. Carter =

American Air Force general & diplomat

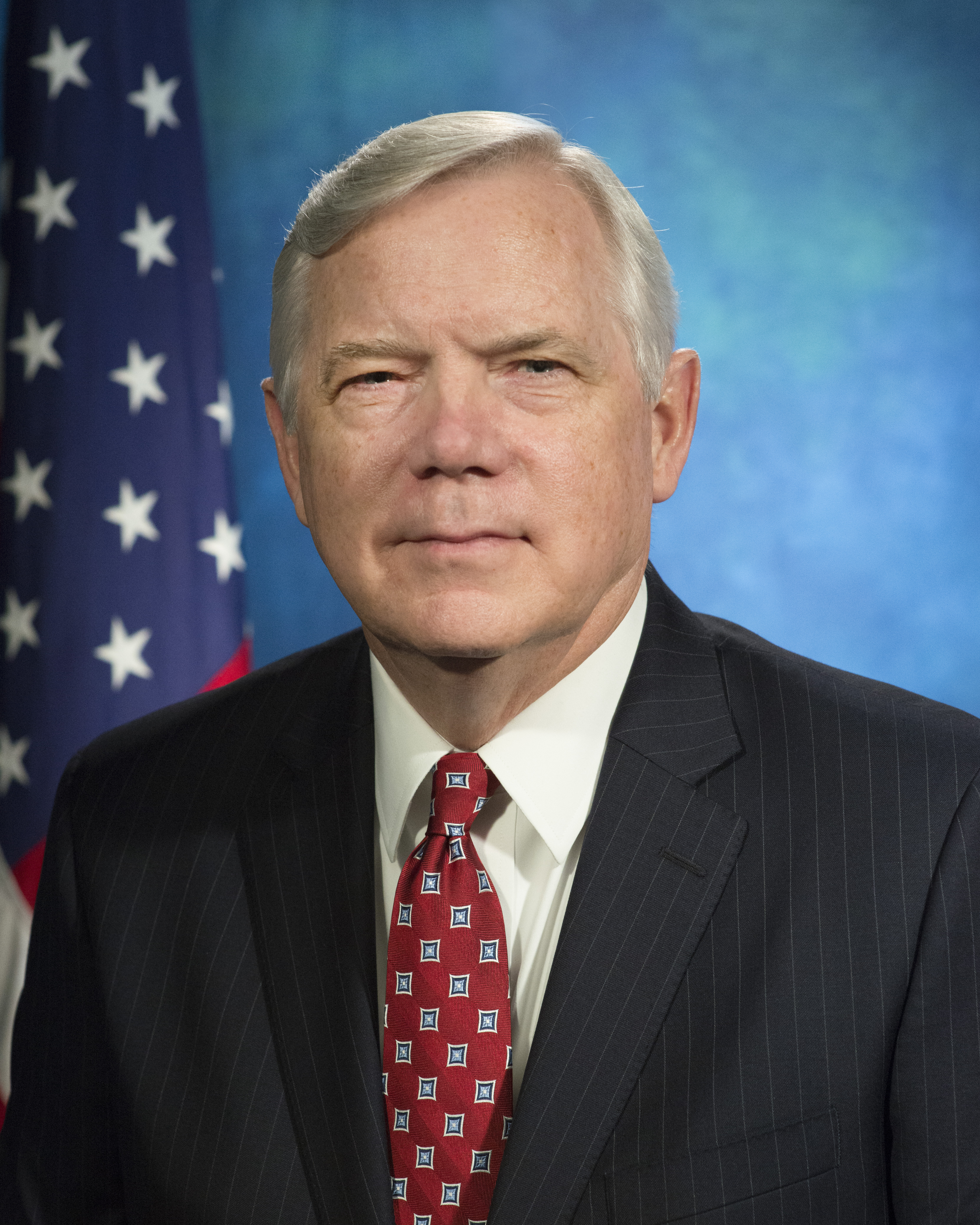

Permanent Representative of the United States to the International Civil Aviation Organization
- In office December 10, 2017 – February 28, 2020
- President: Donald Trump
- Succeeded by: Sean E. Doocey

Personal details
- Born: Memphis, Tennessee
- Education: University of Memphis (B.S.); Georgetown University (MA)

Military service
- Allegiance: United States
- Branch/service: United States Air Force
- Years of service: 1974–2009
- Rank: Major general

Thomas L. Carter is a former military and commercial pilot and retired major general in the Air Force Reserve Command who recently served as the U.S. representative to the Council of the International Civil Aviation Organization. He served over 34 years with the U.S. Air Force and AF Reserve, retiring in 2009. Carter was also a US Airways pilot for 13 years. He previously served as Vice President for Government Relations at Elbit Systems of America and President of Commonwealth Consulting Corporation. He was Senior Counselor to the Coalition Provisional Authority for Legislative Affairs in Baghdad from late 2003 to 2004 and also served as Assistant to the Chairman for Government Affairs of the Columbia Accident Investigation Board in 2003. Carter is a former Deputy Assistant Secretary of Defense and a National Security Affairs staffer for Senate Republican Leader Bob Dole.
