= Brent Christensen =

United States career diplomat

William Brent Christensen
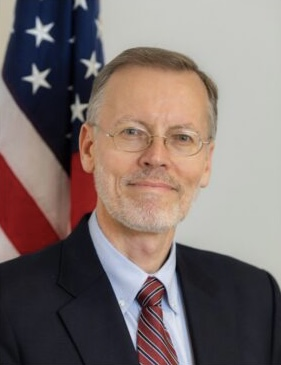

Acting Permanent Representative of the United States to the International Civil Aviation Organization
- In office August 2022 – January 2024
- President: Joe Biden
- Preceded by: Sully Sullenberger
- Succeeded by: Andrew Veprek (acting)

Director of the American Institute in Taiwan
- In office August 11, 2018 – July 15, 2021
- President: Donald Trump; Joe Biden
- Preceded by: Kin W. Moy
- Succeeded by: Sandra Oudkirk

Personal details
- Born: Provo, Utah, U.S.
- Spouse: Brenda Barrus Christensen
- Children: 3
- Education: Brigham Young University (BA); George Washington University (MA); Oregon Health & Science University (DMD)
- Profession: Career Diplomat

William Brent Christensen is an American diplomat who served as director of the U.S. State Department's Office of Taiwan coordination, deputy director and director of the American Institute in Taiwan and Chargé d'Affaires of the U.S. Mission to ICAO.

== Early life and education ==
Christensen is a native of Provo, Utah, and great-great-grandson of C. C. A. Christensen, a Danish American artist. He earned a BA in Chinese language and literature from Brigham Young University, an MA in East Asian Studies from George Washington University, and a DMD (Doctor of Dental Medicine) from the Oregon Health & Science University. Christensen served as a captain in the U.S. Air Force before joining the Foreign Service.

== Diplomatic career ==
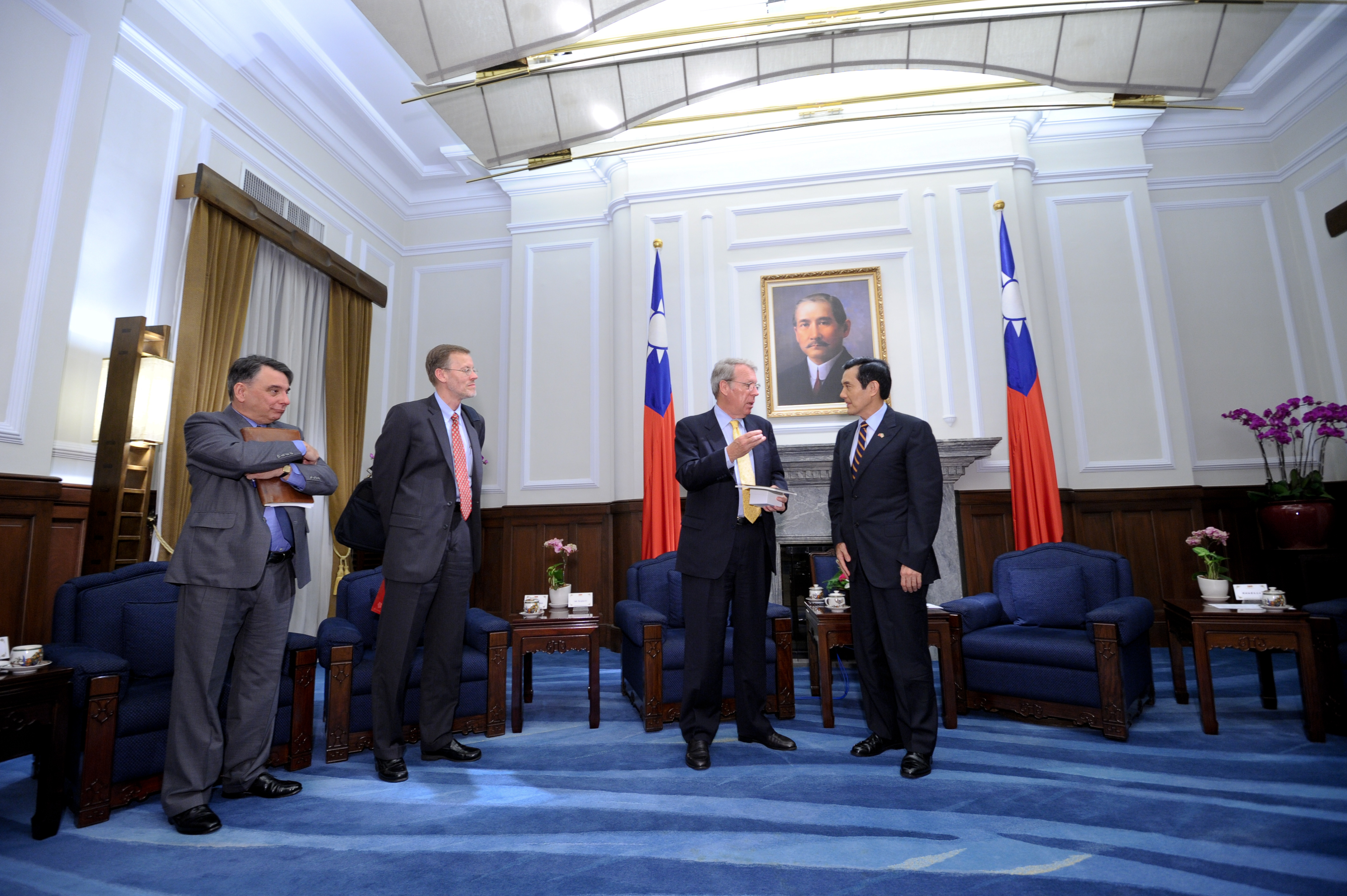
Brent Christensen (second from left) as Director of the Office of Taiwan Coordination, Bureau of East Asian and Pacific Affairs, United States Department of State, met with President Ma Ying-jeou in 2011.

Christensen, since 2010, was director of the State Department's Office of Taiwan coordination, where he had a primary role in formulating U.S. policy toward Taiwan. In his posting at the U.S. Embassy in Beijing from 2007 to 2010, he served as counselor for environment, science, technology and health, where he established the Embassy's air quality monitoring program and led working groups on avian influenza, HIV/AIDS and climate change.

Christensen also served as a Congressional Fellow on the staff of former U.S. Senator Olympia Snowe.

His earlier overseas postings include Beijing, Hong Kong and South Africa. He joined the Daniel K. Inouye Asia-Pacific Center for Security Studies as foreign policy advisor.

In August 2022, Christensen was appointed Chargé d'Affaires of the U.S. Mission to the International Civil Aviation Organization (ICAO), succeeding Chesley "Sully" Sullenberger.

In December 2023, it was announced Christensen will teach at Brigham Young University, having retired from the State Department.

== Honors and awards ==
On June 18, 2021, he was awarded an Honorary Doctor of Social Science from National Sun Yat-sen University (NSYSU).

On June 24, 2021, Christensen was awarded Grand Medal of Diplomacy by Taiwan's ministry of foreign affairs.

On June 25, 2021, Christensen was conferred Presidential Office Order of the Brilliant Star with Grand Cordon by Taiwan's president Tsai Ing-wen.

Diplomatic posts
Preceded by Kin W. Moy	Director of the American Institute in Taiwan; 2018–2021	Succeeded by Sandra Oudkirk
