= China Steel =

Taiwanese steelmaker

China Steel Corporation 中國鋼鐵股份有限公司

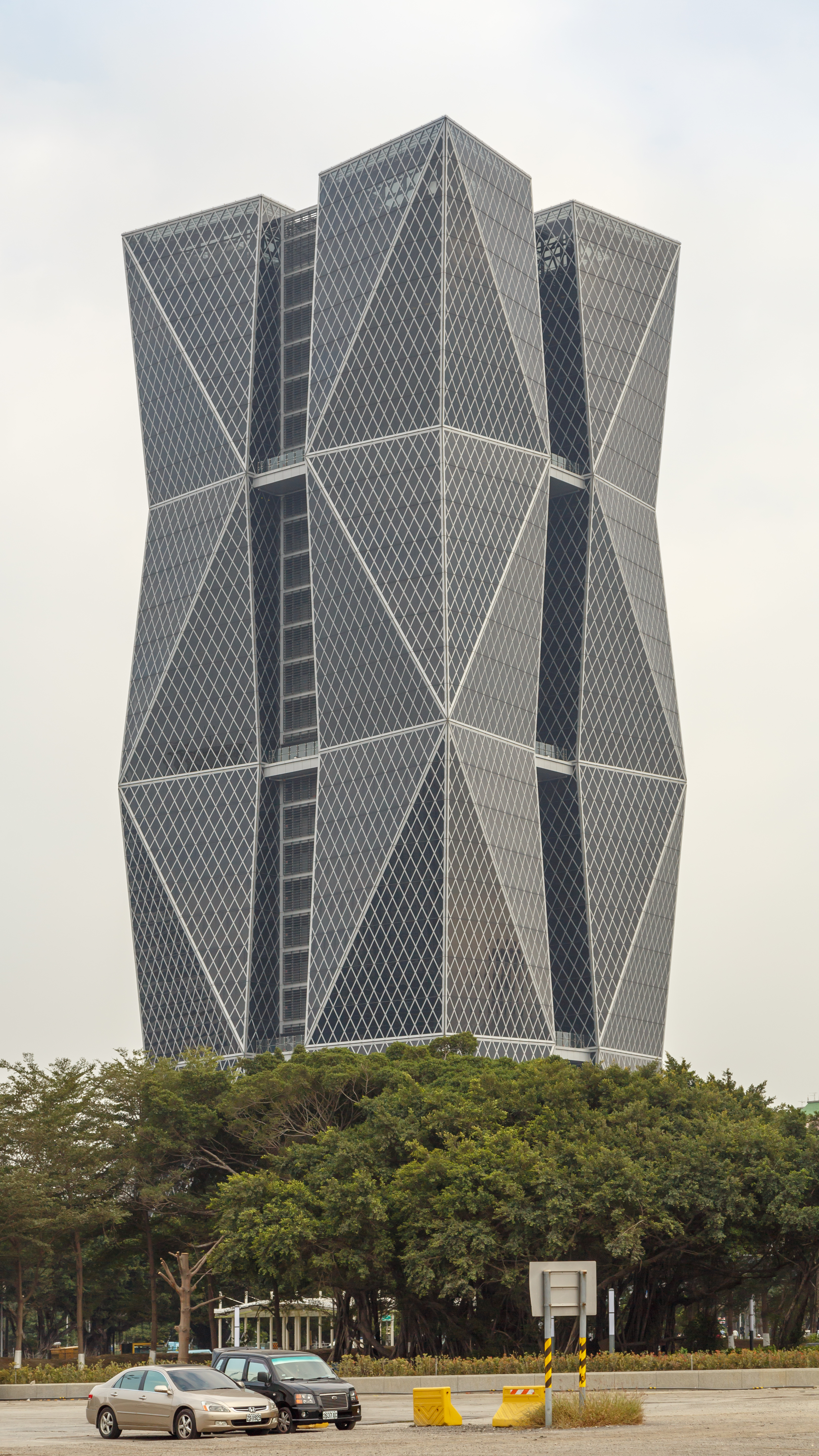
- China Steel Corporation Headquarters in Kaohsiung.
- Company type: Public (TWSE: 2002)
- Industry: Steel
- Founded: December 3, 1971; 54 years ago
- Headquarters: China Steel Corporation Headquarters, Siaogang, Kaohsiung, Taiwan
- Key people: Chairman: J.C. Tsou; President: C.H. Ou
- Products: Plates, Bars, Wire rods, hot rolled products, cold rolled products, electro-galvanized sheets, and electrical sheets.
- Revenue: ▲TWD 177.7 billion (2006)
- Net income: ▲TWD 47.7 billion (2006)
- Number of employees: 9,071 (2006)
- Website: www.csc.com.tw

China Steel Corporation (CSC; Chinese: 中國鋼鐵股份有限公司; pinyin: Zhōngguó Gāngtiě Gǔfèn Yǒuxiàn Gōngsī) is the largest integrated steel maker in Taiwan. Its main steel mill is located in Siaogang District, Kaohsiung. The corporation and its sister companies are administrated under the CSC Group. According to the International Iron and Steel Institute (IISI), China Steel is the 23rd largest steel producer in the world in 2016.

== History ==
China Steel was planned and organized in 1960s and the corporation was officially established on December 3, 1971. Its adoption of the continuous casting production process, which was later computerized, obtained for the company international competitiveness. On November 1, 1974, CSC began the first stage of construction. Its head office was located in Taipei between 1971 and 1975, but translocated to Kaohsiung since September 15, 1975.

The first blast furnace was launched on June 27, 1977. A few months later, the first stage of the building plan of the steel mill was accomplished. The second and the third stage were subsequently accomplished in 1982 and 1988, respectively. Presently, the company has a total of four blast furnaces.

CSC was started as a non-governmental company. It once transformed into a state-owned company on July 1, 1977, and subsequently re-privatized on April 12, 1995. Although CSC is a de jure non-governmental company at present, the Government of the Republic of China (Taiwan) still owns a large portion of its stocks, thus the chairman of the company is appointed by the government.

== Carbon footprint ==
China Steel reported Total CO2e emissions (Direct + Indirect) for the twelve months ending 31 December 2020 at 19,579 Kt (-1,954 /-9.1% y-o-y).

China Steel's annual Total CO2e emissions (Direct + Indirect) (in kilotonnes)
Dec 2018	Dec 2019	Dec 2020
22,100	21,534	19,579

== See also ==
- Formosa Ha Tinh Steel, China Steel 22.5% shareholding since 2017
- List of companies of Taiwan
- Ten Major Construction Projects
