= David Meale =

American diplomat

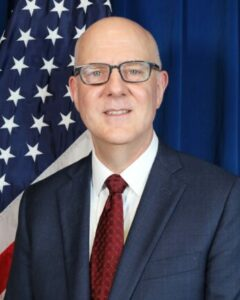

United States Chargé d'affaires to China, a.i.
- In office July 12, 2021 – April 1, 2022
- Preceded by: Robert W. Forden (Chargé d'Affaires, a.i.)
- Succeeded by: R. Nicholas Burns

Personal details
- Spouse: Lisa O’Donnell
- Children: 2
- Education: University of Delaware (BA); National Defense University (MS); Tulane University (MBA)

David Slayton Meale is an American diplomat who is the current nominee to serve as United States ambassador to Bangladesh. Prior to join Bangladesh, he was Deputy Chief of Mission for the Embassy of the United States in Beijing. Prior to this, he served as the Chargé d'affaires for the embassy from July 2021 to March 2022 - in this capacity, he was the senior United States diplomat in China while the Biden Administration's nominee for the Ambassador to China, R. Nicholas Burns, awaited confirmation. Previously, Meale served as the Deputy Assistant Secretary for Trade Policy and Negotiations at the Bureau of Economic and Business Affairs.

== Career ==
In December 2018, Meale became the deputy assistant secretary for trade policy and negotiations at the Bureau of Economic and Business Affairs, a division of the United States Department of State.

Meale visited Taiwan in April 2019, meeting President Tsai Ing-wen and speaking at the American Chamber of Commerce in Taipei during the 40th anniversary of the Taiwan Relations Act.

Diplomatic posts
Preceded by Robert W. Forden	United States Chargé d'affaires to China; 2021–2022	Succeeded by R. Nicholas Burns
