= U.S. Commercial Service in Taiwan =

The U.S. Commercial Service (USCS) in Taiwan, a part of the U.S. Department of Commerce, is the trade promotion section of the American Institute in Taiwan. The mission of the USCS is to promote the export of goods and services from the United States, particularly by small- and medium-sized businesses; to represent U.S. business interests internationally, and to help U.S. businesses find qualified international partners.

The U.S. Commercial Service in Taiwan helps U.S. exporters arrange appointments with potential local business partners or relevant authorities for U.S. exporters visiting Taiwan, provides information on the Taiwan market for U.S. goods and services, and maintains an online directory of U.S. suppliers for use by local importers. In Taiwan, the U.S. Commercial Service offices are located in Taipei and Kaohsiung. In Taipei, there are four commercial officers and 17 local trade staff. In Kaohsiung, there is one officer and one local trade staff.

The core of the USCS is the network of international trade specialists in U.S. Export Assistance Centers throughout the United States and the USCS commercial officers, specialists, assistants, and other staff located at USCS offices in U.S. embassies and consulates in more than 150 cities in 80 countries.

== See also ==
- United States Commercial Service
