= Scott M. Oudkirk =

American diplomat (born 1969)

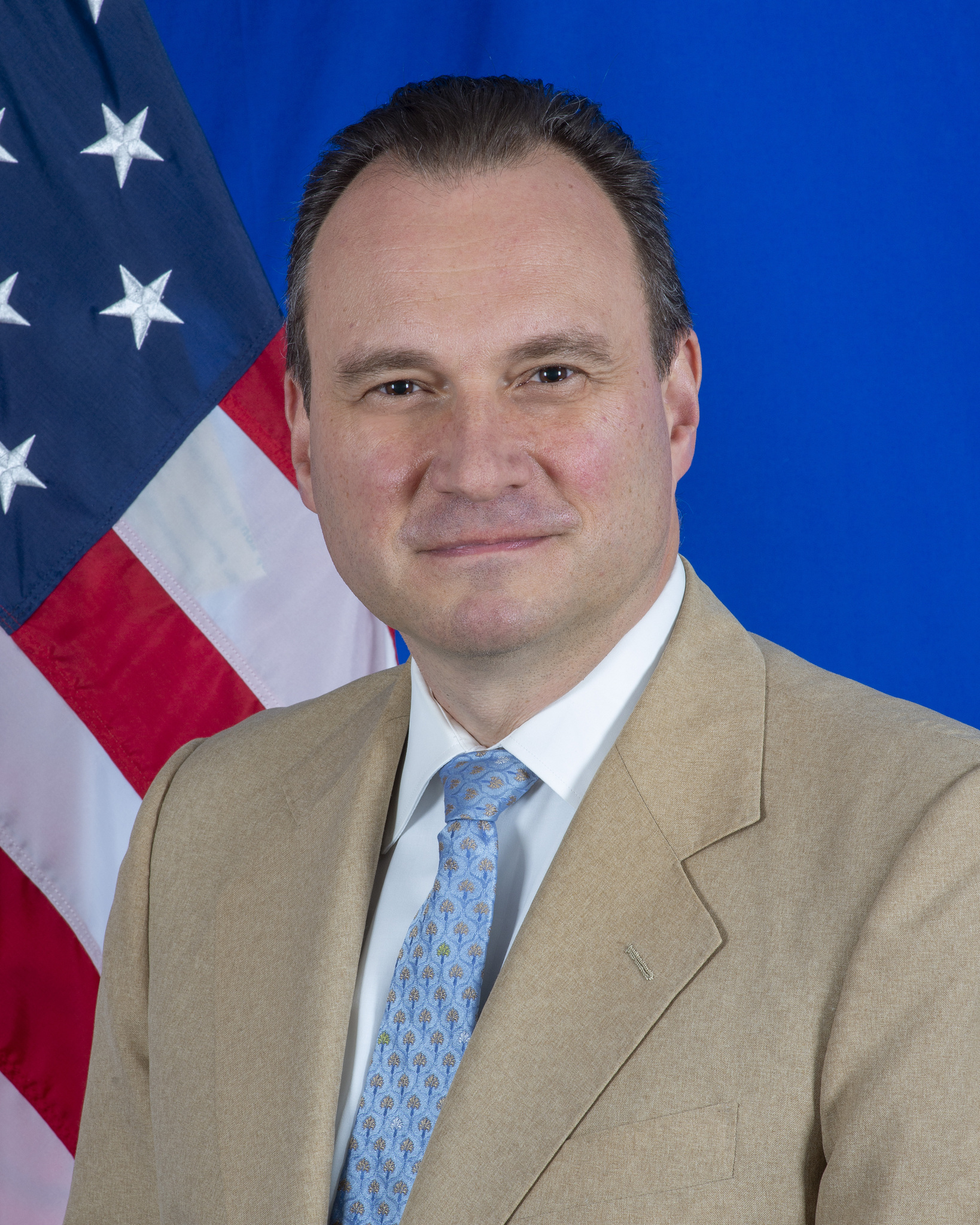
- Official portrait, 2021

United States Ambassador to NATO
- Chargé d'affaires
- In office October 24, 2024 – April 3, 2025
- President: Joe Biden; Donald Trump
- Preceded by: Julianne Smith
- Succeeded by: Matthew Whitaker

United States Deputy Chief of Mission at NATO
- Incumbent
- Assumed office April 3, 2025
- President: Donald Trump

United States Deputy Chief of Mission in Ankara
- In office July 2021 – July 2024

Personal details
- Born: Scott McConnin Oudkirk; June 1969 (age 57) Houston, Texas, U.S.
- Spouse: Sandra Oudkirk (m. 1994)
- Children: 3
- Education: Georgetown University (BSFS); Columbia University (MIA); Dwight D. Eisenhower School for National Security and Resource Strategy (MS, Distinguished Graduate)

Scott McConnin Oudkirk (born June 1969) is an American diplomat and Foreign Service Officer who served as the U.S. Deputy Chief of Mission in Ankara, Turkey from July 2021 until July 2024 and as the chargé d'affaires, in other words, acting United States Ambassador to NATO from October 2024 until April 2025.

== Early life and education ==
Oudkirk was born in Houston, Texas in June 1969. Although moving five times in childhood, his formative experience was in a northern-most part of Appalachia, Wellsville, New York. In 1991, he graduated with a Bachelor of Science in Foreign Service (BSFS) cum laude from Georgetown University’s School of Foreign Service, studying in 1989–1990 at the University of Edinburgh’s Department of Politics. He attended the School of International and Public Affairs at Columbia University, where he received a Master of International Affairs degree. Additionally, he earned a Master of Science degree from the Dwight D. Eisenhower School for National Security and Resource Strategy, where he was a distinguished graduate.

== Career ==
=== Department of Commerce ===
Prior to receiving his Foreign Service commission in 1998, he worked for the Department of Commerce’s International Trade Administration in Washington, D.C. and for the General Electric Company in Charlotte, North Carolina.

=== Counter-ISIS Campaign & Iran ===
From 2013 to 2016, Oudkirk worked on Iraq and the counter-ISIS campaign, first as the Deputy Political Counselor at the Embassy of the United States, Baghdad and later as deputy director and acting director of the State Department's Office of Iraq Affairs. From 2017 to 2018 he served at the National Security Council, following which he was the Director of the State Department's Office of Iran Affairs, as well as acting Deputy Assistant Secretary of State for Iran during the first Trump Administration's maximum pressure campaign.

=== Deputy Chief of Mission ===
Oudkirk began his assignment as Deputy Chief of Mission at the U.S. Embassy in Ankara, Turkey in July 2021, serving under Ambassadors David M. Satterfield and Jeff Flake. In this role, he played an active part in renewing U.S.-Turkish relations. He concluded that assignment in July 2024.

=== United States Acting Permanent Representative to NATO ===
Oudkirk became the chargé d'affaires, that is acting United States Ambassador to NATO, on October 24, 2024, following Julianne Smith's departure.

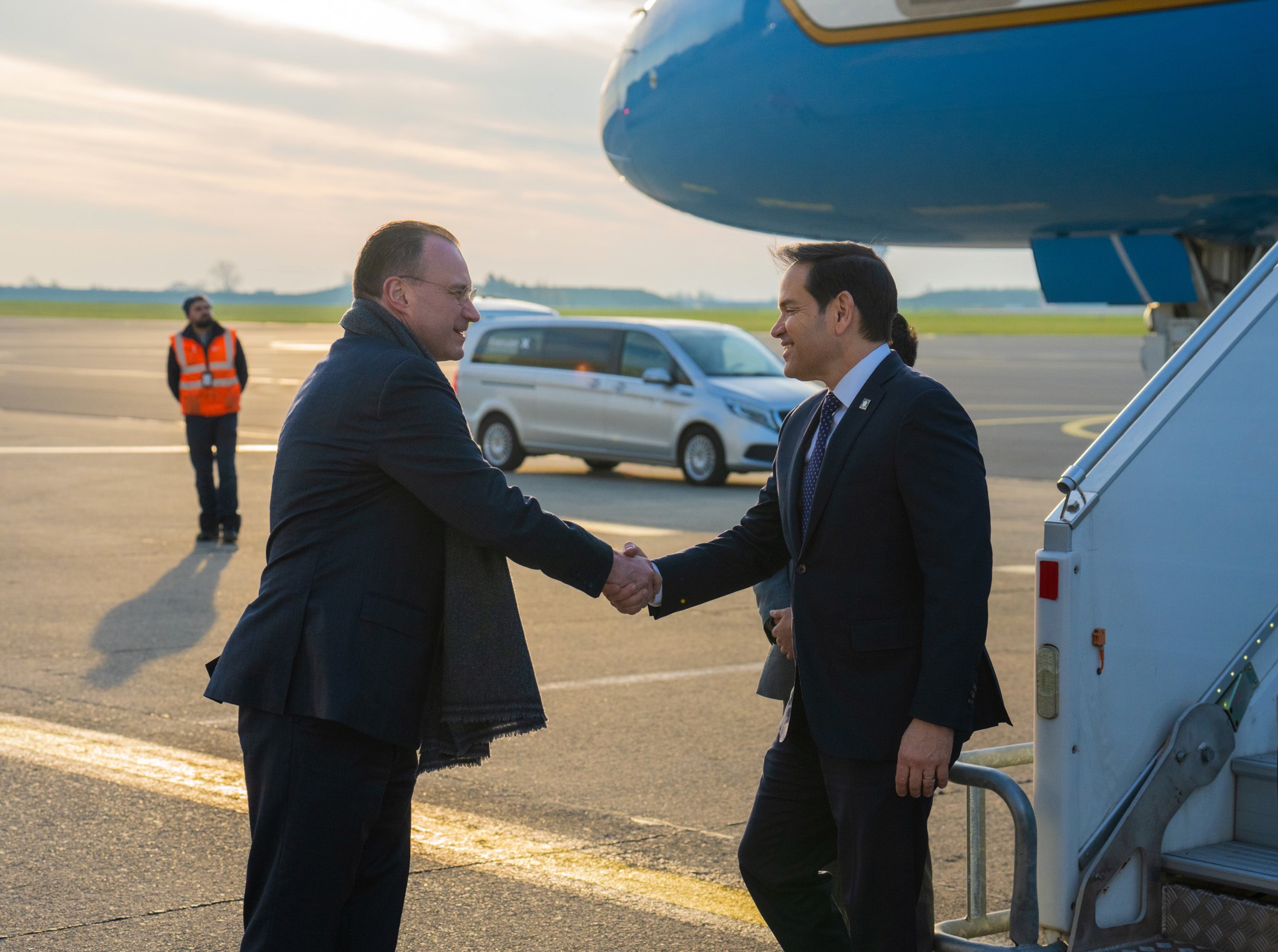
Oudkirk shakes hands with Secretary of State Marco Rubio in 2025

Oudkirk was succeeded by former acting Attorney General Matthew Whitaker. Oudkirk resumed duty as the Deputy Chief of Mission on April 3, 2025.

=== Other Department of State Experience ===
Prior to his experience in Iraq, Oudkirk served in Ankara, Turkey (1999–2001), Kingston, Jamaica (2001–2004), and Washington (2004–2005). During his tour in Istanbul, Turkey (2005–2009), he managed the consular aspects of the evacuation of U.S. citizens from Beirut during the 2006 Lebanon War to the port of Mersin, making use of Incirlik Air Base to shelter the evacuees and return them by air to the United States. During his tour in Beijing, China (2010–2013), he played a direct role in assisting dissident human rights lawyer Chen Guangcheng’s relocation to the United States in 2012.

== Personal life ==
Oudkirk is married to Sandra Oudkirk, a fellow diplomat who has held prominent positions, including serving as the Director of the American Institute in Taiwan. Their three children were born in Turkey.

Oudkirk speaks English, Turkish, Chinese, and Spanish.

== See also ==
- List of United States permanent representatives to NATO
