= List of United States representatives to the International Civil Aviation Organization =

Permanent Representative of the United States of America to the International Civil Aviation Organization
- Seal of the Department of State

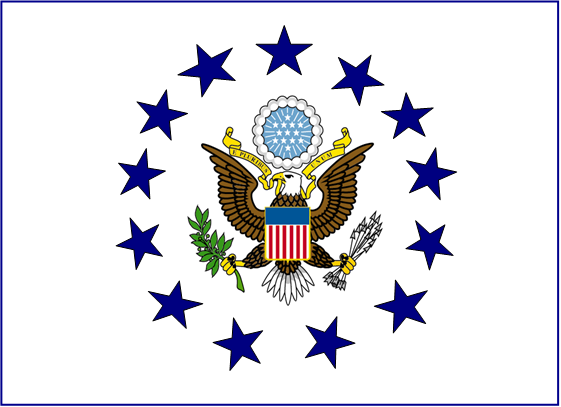
- Flag of a United States chief of mission
- Incumbent; Anthony Clare as charge d'affaires since August 2024
- United States Department of State
- Style: His Excellency (diplomatic)
- Reports to: President of the United States; United States Secretary of State
- Seat: ICAO Headquarters; Montreal, Quebec, Canada
- Appointer: President of the United States with Senate advice and consent
- Term length: No fixed term At the pleasure of the president of the United States
- Formation: September 22, 1947; 78 years ago
- First holder: Laurence S. Kuter
- Website: icao.usmission.gov

The United States permanent representative to the International Civil Aviation Organization is the leader of the U.S. mission to the International Civil Aviation Organization (ICAO). The position is formally known as the permanent representative of the United States of America, with the rank and status of ambassador extraordinary and plenipotentiary. The position is but one of the United States' representatives to the United Nations and its other constituent agencies. The U.S. nominee to the Air Navigation Commission, a body that works towards the uniformity in regulations, standards and procedures which will facilitate and improve air navigation to international standards, acts as the deputy to the permanent representative.

The United States sent a delegation to the 1944 Chicago Conference, and became a party of the Convention on International Civil Aviation which was resolved at its end on 7 December 1944. The United States first sent a permanent representative to serve on the Council of the Provisional International Civil Aviation Organization (PICAO) which began operating on 6 June 1945 and was replaced by ICAO on 7 April 1947. Air Force General Laurence S. Kuter was appointed the first representative to ICAO by presidential order in September 1946, and fully appointed in September 1947.

== List of representatives ==
Status Denotes acting Denotes recess appointment

The following is a chronological list of those who have held the office:

| # | Portrait | Ambassador | Years served | Notes |
|---|---|---|---|---|
| 1 | | Laurence S. Kuter | September 22, 1947 – February 29, 1948 | |
| 2 | | Paul Albert Smith | September 24, 1948 – August 1, 1953; Recess appointment, confirmed by the U.S. Senate on December 13, 1949 | |
| 3 | | Harold Armstrong Jones | July 22, 1953 – November 15, 1956 | |
| 4 | | Nelson Binkley David | August 7, 1957 – August 31, 1968 | |
| 5 | | Robert Patrick Boyle | August 9, 1968 – May 23, 1969 | |
| 6 | | Charles Frederick Butler | May 2, 1969 – November 13, 1971 | |
| 7 | | Betty Rose Dillon | November 8, 1971 – October 12, 1977 | |
| 8 | | John Edward Downs | October 12, 1977 – October 26, 1982 | |
| 9 | | Edmund Stohr | September 15, 1982 – April 20, 1990 | |
| 10 | | Don M. Newman | June 27, 1990 – May 8, 1994 | |
| 11 | | Carol Jones Carmody | April 9, 1994 – February 27, 1999 | |
| 12 | | Edward W. Stimpson | October 5, 1999 – December 17, 2004 | |
| 13 | | Donald T. Bliss | February 17, 2005 – January 19, 2009 | |
| 14 | | Duane Woerth | October 1, 2010 – December 23, 2013 | |
| 15 | | Michael Anderson Lawson | July 22, 2014 – January 19, 2017 | |
| 16 | | Thomas L. Carter | December 10, 2017 – February 28, 2020 | |
| — | | Sean E. Doocey (acting) | April 17, 2020 – January 17, 2021 | |
| 17 | | Sully Sullenberger | February 3, 2022 – July 1, 2022 | |
| — | | Brent Christensen (acting) | August 2022 – January 2024 | |
| — | | Andrew M. Veprek (acting) | January 2024 – August 2024 | |
