= William A. Stanton (diplomat) =

American diplomat (born 1947)

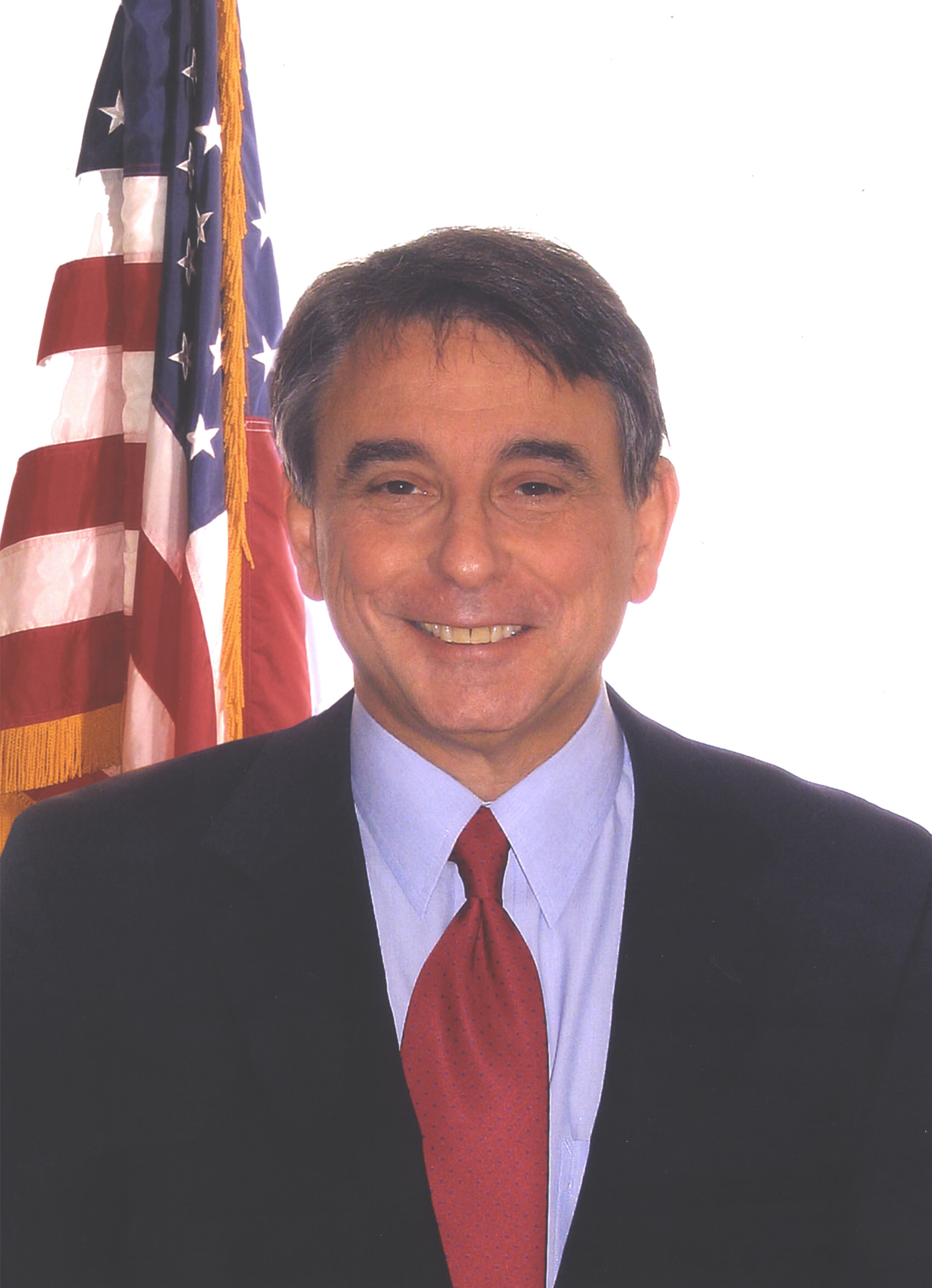
William A. "Bill" Stanton

William A. Stanton (born 1947) is an American retired career diplomat. Since his retirement from the U.S. Foreign Service in 2012, he has consecutively served as a professor in Taiwan at National Tsing Hua University, National Taiwan University, National Yang Ming University which became National Yang Ming Jiao Tung University, and in 2021 as Chair Professor at National Chengchi University.

== Early life and education ==
Born in 1947 to a mother of Armenian descent and a father of Irish and Italian descent, Stanton earned a B.A. magna cum laude from Fordham University and an M.A. and Ph.D. in English literature from University of North Carolina at Chapel Hill which he attended on a National Defense Education Act Fellowship. He also spent a year studying at Albert-Ludwigs University in Freiburg, Germany.

== Career ==
Dr. Stanton served for 34 years as a U.S. diplomat, serving as consular and political officer at the US Embassy in Beirut (1979–81), watch officer in the Department of State Operations Center (1981–82), staff assistant for the Assistant Secretary for Near East and South Asian Affairs (1982–83), Country Officer for Lebanon (1983–85), political officer in the US Embassy in Beijing (1987–90), chief of internal political reporting (1989–90), political-military affairs officer in the US Embassy in Islamabad (1991–93), Special Assistant for East Asia and Pacific Affairs for the Under Secretary for Political Affairs (1993–4), Deputy Director for the Office of Chinese and Mongolian Affairs (1994–95), Minister Counselor for Political Affairs at the US Embassy in Beijing (1995–98), Director of the Office of UN Political Affairs (1999-01), Director of the Office of Egyptian and North African Affairs (2001–03).

While stationing at the US Embassy in Canberra, he served as the Deputy Chief of Mission (2003–05) and Chargé d'affaires ad interim (2005–06), then he was assigned to the US Embassy in Seoul to take his post as DCM. His final posting was as Director of the American Institute in Taiwan (2009–2012). During his tenure, the United States achieved significant progress on a number of key bilateral issues, including Taiwan's entry into the U.S. Visa Waiver Program, two major security assistance agreements, increased high-level visits by U.S. Government officials, and resolution of trade disputes, including the re-introduction of U.S. beef into Taiwan. For his contributions to U.S. exports to Taiwan, Stanton won the 2011 Charles E. Cobb Award for Initiative and Success in Trade Development. For his overall contributions to U.S.-Taiwan relations, Taiwan awarded Stanton the Order of Brilliant Star with Grand Cordon.

Stanton's State Department awards included the Secretary's Career Achievement Award, three Superior Honor Awards, one Superior Group Award, and several performance awards. For his contributions to the U.S. Forces Korea Command from 2006 to 2009, the U.S. Department of the Army awarded Stanton the Outstanding Civilian Service Medal.

Following his retirement in August 2012, he was granted a Taiwan Resident Certificate for his efforts in promoting US-Taiwan ties.

== After diplomacy ==
Since August 16, 2019 Stanton has served as Vice President of National Yang Ming University in Taiwan. From August 1, 2017 to July 31, 2019, he served as Professor in the Center for General Education at National Taiwan University. From 2013 to 2017 he was the George K.C. Yeh Distinguished Chair Professor at National Tsing Hua University in Hsinchu, Taiwan where he was the founding Director of the University's Asia Policy Center.

== Family ==
Stanton was formerly married to another Foreign Service Officer and former Ambassador, Karen Stanton (Ambassador to East Timor). They have two daughters, Katherine and Elizabeth.

Diplomatic posts
Preceded by Stephen Young	Director of the American Institute in Taiwan; 2009–2012	Succeeded by Christopher J. Marut
