= Sandra Oudkirk =

United States career diplomat

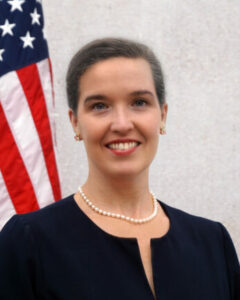
- Oudkirk in 2021

15th Director of the American Institute in Taiwan
- In office July 15, 2021 – July 8, 2024
- President: Joe Biden
- Preceded by: Brent Christensen
- Succeeded by: Raymond F. Greene

U.S. Senior Official for Asia-Pacific Economic Cooperation
- In office 2019–2021

Personal details
- Born: Tampa, Florida, United States
- Spouse: Scott M. Oudkirk (m. 1994)
- Education: Georgetown University (BS)
- Profession: Diplomat

Sandra Springer Oudkirk is an American diplomat. She previously served as the U.S. Senior Official for APEC and Deputy Assistant Secretary of State for Australia, New Zealand, and the Pacific Islands in the Bureau of East Asian and Pacific Affairs, Director of the American Institute in Taiwan, becoming the first woman to hold this position, Civilian Deputy and Foreign Policy Advisor of the United States European Command, and Chargé d'Affaires of the United States to Ukraine.

== Early life and education ==
Oudkirk was born and raised in Tampa, Florida. She is a graduate of Georgetown University's Walsh School of Foreign Service.

== Career ==
Oudkirk started working for the US State Department in 1991. She has served consular assignments in Taipei and Dublin as well as assignments in Turkey, Jamaica, and China. Oudkirk's prior appointments include U.S. Senior Official for APEC and Deputy Assistant Secretary for Australia, New Zealand, and the Pacific Islands. In October 2019, she attended the Pacific Islands Dialogue and the Yushan Forum where she emphasized the need for diplomatic ties between Taiwan and its Pacific allies.

Oudkirk was appointed Director of the American Institute in Taiwan on July 8, 2021. She is the first woman to hold the role. Oudkirk formally took office on July 15, 2021.

In a December 2023 interview with NPR, when asked if she believed a PRC invasion of Taiwan was imminent, Oudkirk stated: "There's an important distinction between making plans and training troops and actually, you know, getting ready to do something. And I think we have even heard from the PRC [People's Republic of China] themselves that their preference would be for a peaceful reunification. And the United States is confident that there is no imminent threat of invasion for Taiwan." Before Oudkirk left the Institute in early July 2024, Taiwan awarded her a Grand Medal of Diplomacy and the Order of Brilliant Star with Grand Cordon.

In August 2025, Oudkirk was appointed Civilian Deputy and Foreign Policy Advisor of the United States European Command.

== Personal life ==
Oudkirk is fluent in Mandarin Chinese and Turkish. She is married to Scott M. Oudkirk, with whom she served at embassies in Ankara, Kingston, and Beijing. Their three children were all born in Turkey.

Diplomatic posts
Preceded by Brent Christensen	Director of the American Institute in Taiwan; 2021–2024	Succeeded by Raymond F. Greene
