= Raymond F. Greene =

American diplomat

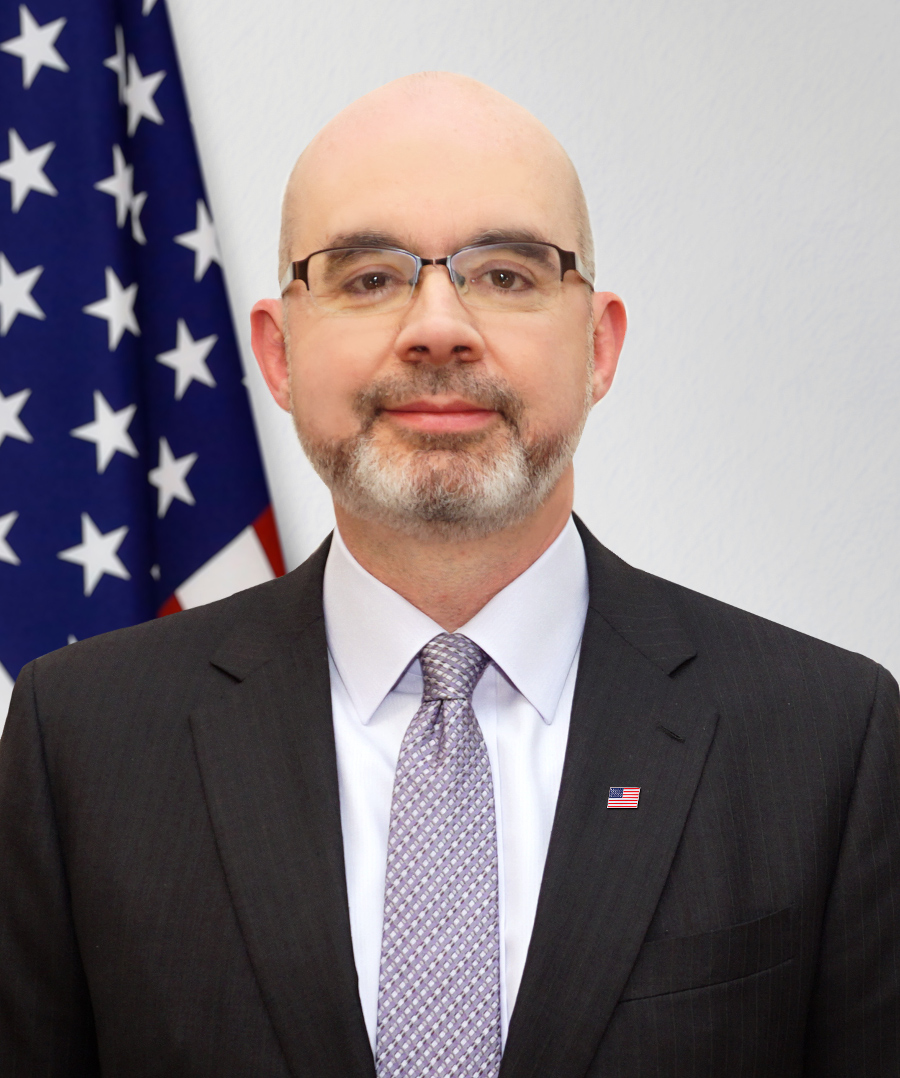
- Official portrait

16th Director of the American Institute in Taiwan
- Incumbent
- Assumed office July 8, 2024
- President: Joe Biden; Donald Trump
- Preceded by: Sandra Oudkirk

Personal details
- Spouse: Yawen Ko
- Education: University of Maryland, College Park
- Occupation: Diplomat

Raymond F. Greene is an American diplomat and the Director of the American Institute in Taiwan. Prior, Greene was the deputy chief of mission in Japan 2021–2024. Greene served in a number of posts for U.S. embassies and consulates in Manila, Okinawa Prefecture, and Chengdu.

== Career ==
According to the American Institute in Taiwan, Greene advised on East Asian economic policy for the National Security Council, and the Bureau of East Asian and Pacific Affairs. Greene was elected Chair of the Asia Pacific Economic Cooperation's Economic Committee. Greene also served as a political officer in Manila.

As consul general in Okinawa Prefecture, Greene coordinated earthquake aid relief from the U.S. to Japan in Operation Tomodachi around 2011.

Greene was consul general in Chengdu for nearly three years until 2017.

In 2018, Greene became Deputy Director of the American Institute in Taiwan.

In 2021, Greene became charge d'affaires ad interim in Japan, leading temporary ambassador duties until Rahm Emanuel became U.S. Ambassador to Japan. Subsequently he was the deputy chief of mission.

On 8 July 2024, Greene assumed charge as Director of the American Institute in Taiwan after Sandra Oudkirk, his third posting in Taiwan.

In February 2025, Taiwan News reported that Greene is expected to remain as American Institute in Taiwan director amidst shifts in U.S. diplomatic positions.
