= Order of Brilliant Star =

Taiwanese civilian award

Order of Brilliant Star 景星勳章
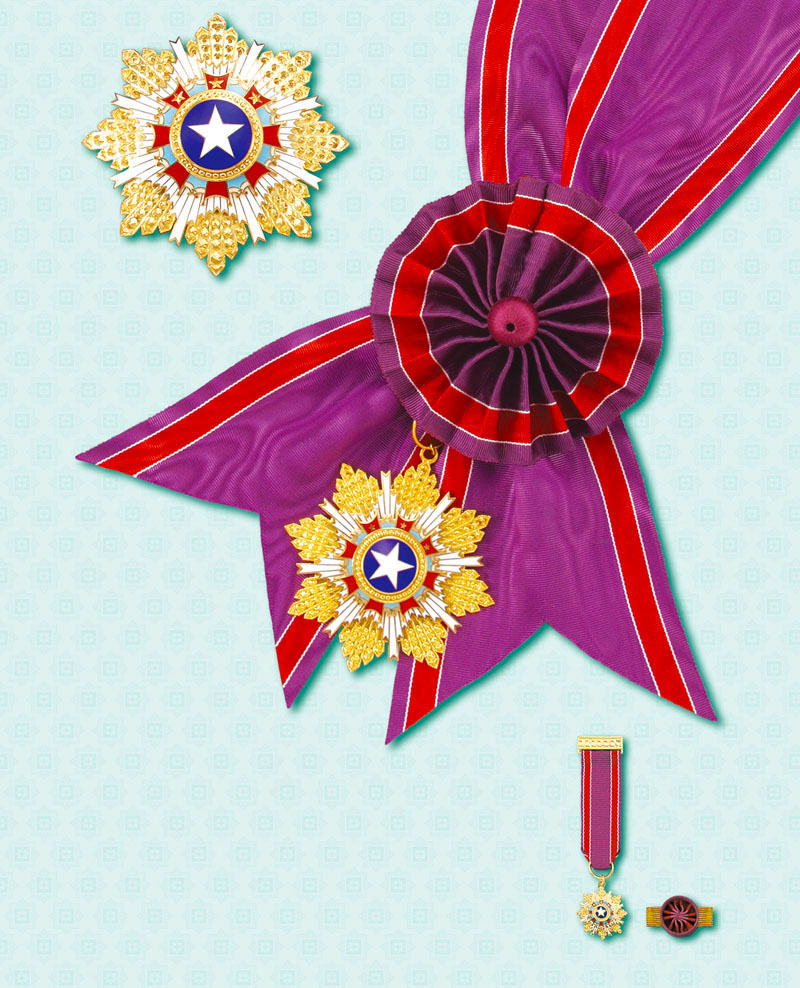
- Order of the Brilliant Star cordon, badge, star, medal and lapel pin
- Type: Medal with or without cordon
- Country: Republic of China
- Presented by: President of the Republic of China (Taiwan)
- Eligibility: Civilian, either foreign or ROC national
- Status: active
- Established: 12 February 1941

Precedence
- Next (higher): Order of Propitious Clouds

Order of Brilliant Star (Chinese: 景星勳章; pinyin: Jǐng xīng xūnzhāng) is a civilian order of the Republic of China (Taiwan) recognizing outstanding contributions to the country's development. The order was instituted in 1941 and can be awarded to both domestic and foreign nationals.

== Order medal and ranks ==
The center of the medal is a five-pointed star in token of virtue. The name "Brilliant Star" came from the ancient book of Records of the Grand Historian (史記) which says "The Brilliant Stars, which differs in appearance from time to time, shine upon the nations of the righteous."

There are nine ranks within the order according to the Article of Decorations of the Republic of China. First rank is awarded by the President of Republic of China.

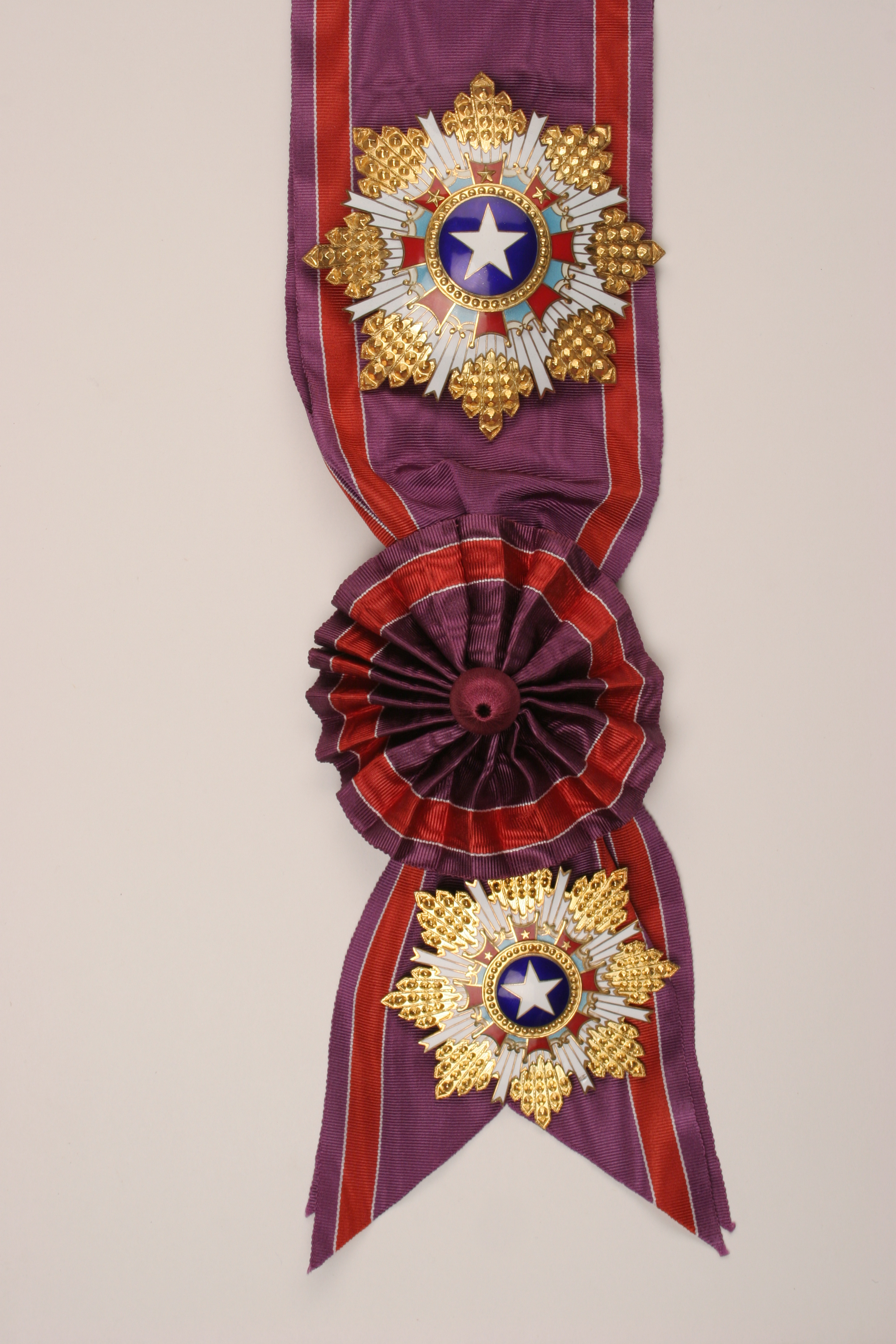
The first class of The Order of the Brilliant Star of Taiwan conferred on President Havel

=== Classes ===
Grades	Ribbon bar
1st Class (Special Grand Cordon)	
2nd Class (Grand Cordon)	
3rd Class (Purple Grand Cordon)	
4th Class (Special Cravat)	
5th Class (Cravat)	
6th Class (Special Rosette)	
7th Class (Rosette)	
8th Class (Special Ribbon)	
9th Class (Ribbon)	

== Recipients ==
=== First Rank ===
==== Republic of China Nationals ====
Date Awarded	Recipient	Service Awarded For
14 May 2025	Anthony Chung-Yi Ho	Taiwanese diplomat to the Holy See
6 February 2021	Chow Wang	Secretary-General of The Coalition
17 December 2015	Pai Hsien-yung	
17 December 2015	Yu Guangzhong	
5 October 2012	Tseng Yung-chuan	Secretary-General of the Presidential Office
24 February 2012	Wu Jin-lin	Secretary-General of the Presidential Office
17 February 2012	Sean Chen	Vice premier of the Republic of China
31 January 2011	Liao Liou-yi	Secretary-General of the Presidential Office
9 November 2010	Hsieh Tsai-chuan	
15 September 2009	Paul Chiu	Vice premier of the Republic of China
15 September 2009	Chan Chun-po	Secretary-General of the Presidential Office
16 July 2009	Chiu Hong-Da	
7 May 2008	Mark Chen	Secretary-General of the Presidential Office
20 May 2007	Lee Jye	Minister of National Defence
16 February 2006	Paul Shan Cardinal Kuo-hsi, SJ	Roman Catholic Cardinal of Taiwan
27 January 2006	Wu Rong-i	Vice premier of the Republic of China
2 March 2005	Su Tseng-chang	President of the Executive Yuan
2 March 2005	Yeh Chu-lan	Vice premier of the Republic of China
19 May 2004	Kang Ning-hsiang	Secretary-General of National Security Council
19 May 2004	Chiou I-jen	Secretary-General of the Presidential Office
18 May 2004	Tang Yao-ming	Minister of National Defence
18 May 2004	Lin Hsin-i	Vice premier of the Republic of China
25 September 2003	Lee Ming-liang	Head of Department of Health
30 January 2003	Chen Shimeng	Secretary-General of the Presidential Office
4 February 2002	Lai In-jaw	Vice premier of the Republic of China
31 January 2002	Yu Shyi-kun	Premier of the Republic of China
6 September 2001	Chuang Ming-yao	Secretary-General of National Security Council
16 May 2000	Yin Tsung-wen	Secretary-General of National Security Council
16 May 2000	Liu Chao-shiuan	Vice premier of the Republic of China
2000	Lin Rong-San	
3 August 1996	Wu Po-hsiung	Secretary-General of the Presidential Office
27 December 1994	Kwoh-Ting Li	Minister of Finance & Minister of Economic Affairs
16 April 1994	Chiang Wei-kuo	Secretary-General of National Security Council
2 March 1993	Ta-You Wu	President of Academia Sinica
July 1978	Yu Kuo-hwa	Premier of the Republic of China
1961	Jack C. K. Teng	Chairman of Chinese National Olympic Committee (Now Chinese Taipei Olympic Committee)
10 October 1945	Zhu Jiahua	Deputy President of Academia Sinica
1944	Chen Li-Fu	Senior Advisor of State
1944	Zhang Qun	Premier of the Republic of China
1 January 1944	Zhang Boling	President and founder of Nankai University

==== Foreign Nationals ====
Date Awarded	Recipient	Service Awarded For
9 May 2024	Hideo Tarumi	Japanese diplomat
23 March 2023	Robert O'Brien	U.S. National Security Advisor
11 March 2022	Edwin Laurent	St. Lucia Ambassador to the Republic of China
3 March 2022	Mike Pompeo	Former U.S. Secretary of State
1 September 2015	Ed Royce (2nd time)	Chairman of the United States House Committee on Foreign Affairs
12 June 2017	Reinaldo Pared Pérez	Speaker of the Chamber of Deputies of the Dominican Republic
8 April 2016	Ludwig Keke	Ambassador of Nauru to Taiwan
7 April 2016	Paul Fitzpatrick Russell	Apostolic Nuncio to the Republic of China
15 September 2015	Juan Afara	Vice President of Paraguay
15 September 2015	Hugo A. Velazquez	Speaker of the Chamber of Deputies of Paraguay
31 July 2015	Manuel Salvador dos Ramos	Minister of Foreign Affairs (São Tomé and Príncipe)
31 July 2015	Frederic Laplanche	head of the European Economic and Trade Office in Taipei
26 July 2015	Philip Kabua	Marshall Islands Ambassador to the Republic of China
9 July 2015	Caroline Vermeulen	Director of the Belgian Office in Taipei
15 April 2015	Christopher J. Marut	Director of the American Institute in Taiwan
15 April 2015	Calvin Eu	Head Trade Representative of the Singapore Trade Office in Taipei
13 March 2015	Ed Royce	Chairman of the United States House Committee on Foreign Affairs
17 July 2012	William Stanton	Chairman of American Institute in Taiwan
11 October 2011	Donald Rumsfeld	Former U.S. Secretary of Defense
3 June 2008	Julio Guillermo González Gamarra	President of Central American Parliament
19 May 2008	Shintaro Ishihara	Governor of Tokyo
15 April 2008	Chikage Oogi	President of Japanese House of Councillors
22 November 2006	Yoshirō Mori	Former Prime Minister of Japan
23 November 2004	Václav Havel	Former President of the Czech Republic
May 2000	Per Ahlmark	Support for democratization of Taiwan
23 October 1969	Mai Mai Gana	Nigerian state inspector
23 October 1969	Mouddou Zakara	Nigerian Minister of Telecommunications
May 1960	Archie Lochhead	President of Universal Trading Corporation
March 1948	Ronald Hall	Bishop of the Diocese of Hong Kong and Macao

=== Second Rank ===
==== Republic of China Nationals ====
Date Awarded	Recipient	Service Awarded For
6 May 2016	Shen Lyu-shun	ROC Representative to the United States
6 May 2016	David Lin	Minister of Foreign Affairs, R.O.C.
1 March 2016	Bruce Cheng	Long-term and outstanding contributions to the country in terms of technology development, industrial upgrading and talent cultivation.
14 November 2013	Lo Chih-chiang	Deputy Secretary-General of the ROC Presidential Office
2 May 2006	Ang Lee	Outstanding service in film directing. The Presidential Office announced that Ang Lee will be honoured First Rank OBS in 2013.
12 July 1975	Fredrick Chien	Vice Minister, Ministry of Foreign Affairs, R.O.C.
23 March 1966	Yu-Tang Daniel Lew	Ambassador, Ministry of Foreign Affairs, R.O.C.

==== Foreign Nationals ====
Date Awarded	Recipient	Service Awarded For
6 May 2026	Michael J. Fonte	
26 February 2026	Sadaharu Oh	Japan-based baseball legend
25 February 2026	Andrea Clare Bowman	Vincentian diplomat to Taiwan
23 January 2026	Cheloy E. Velicaria-Garafil	Former Chairperson and Resident Representative of the Manila Economic and Cultural Office
20 January 2026	Markéta Pekarová Adamová	Former President of the Chamber of Deputies (Czech Republic)
9 October 2025	Candice Pitts	Belizean diplomat to Taiwan
27 June 2025	Ohashi Mitsuo	Former Japan-Taiwan Exchange Association Chairman
3 June 2025	Hilda C. Heine	President of the Marshall Islands
2 May 2025	Carlos José Fleitas Rodríguez	Paraguayan diplomat to Taiwan
22 April 2025	Roudy Stanley Penn	Haitian diplomat to Taiwan
7 April 2025	Ushio Shigeru	
14 January 2025	Gabrielius Landsbergis	Lithuania Minester of Foreign Affairs
3 January 2025	Oscar Adolfo Padilla Lam	Guatemalan diplomat to Taiwan
22 July 2024	Filip Grzegorzewski	Head of the European Economic and Trade Office to Tiwan
3 July 2024	Sandra Oudkirk	Director of the American Institute in Taiwan
21 December 2015	David Alexander	
21 December 2015	Etienne Georges Beauregard	
21 December 2015	Andres Diaz de Rabago	
21 December 2015	Daniel Freeman	
21 December 2015	Theresa Kastner	
21 December 2015	Fr. Gian Carlo Michelini	
21 December 2015	Yves Moal	
21 December 2015	Brendan O'Connell	
21 December 2015	Antoine Pierrot	
21 December 2015	Giovanni Rizz	
21 December 2015	Juanelva Rose	
21 December 2015	Miljenka Schnetzer	
17 September 1988	Albert Allen Sealey	
October 1980	Pik Botha	South African Minister of Foreign Affairs
1970	Ta-Chung Liu	Economist
1961	Tomás Gabriel Duque	
