= American Institute in Taiwan =

De facto US embassy in Taiwan

Coordinates: 25°4′46.82″N 121°35′57.08″E

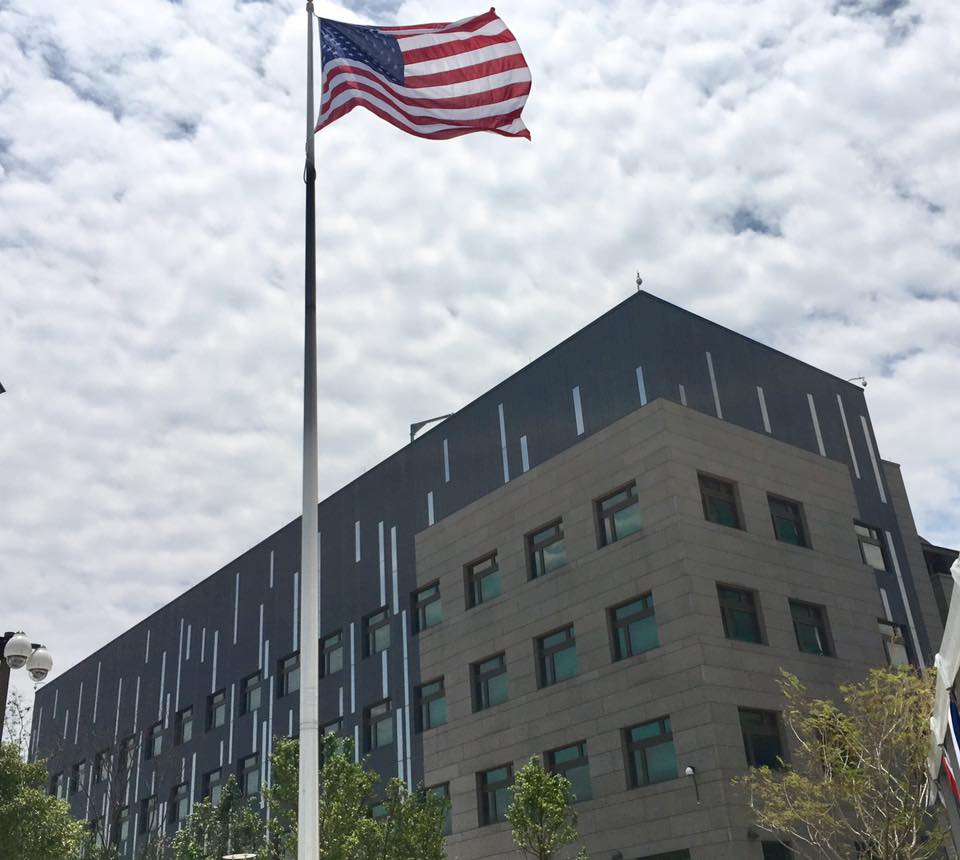
- American Institute in Taipei, with the flag of the United States flown out front
- Founded: Washington, D.C. (January 16, 1979)
- Founder: Harvey J. Feldman (U.S. diplomat)
- Type: U.S. Government-Sponsored Nonprofit, Private Corporation
- Headquarters: Rosslyn, Arlington, Virginia
- Location: 100 Jinhu Road, Neihu District, Taipei city, 114017
- Region served: Taiwan
- Services: De facto embassy functions
- Chairperson: Vacant
- Director: Raymond F. Greene
- Subsidiaries: Kaohsiung Branch Office of the American Institute in Taiwan
- Budget: $35.964 million (FY 2026)
- Website: www.ait.org.tw
- Under authorization by the Taiwan Relations Act

The American Institute in Taiwan (AIT; Chinese: 美國在台協會; pinyin: Měiguó Zài Tái Xiéhuì) is the informal mission of the United States of America in Taiwan. It is a wholly owned subsidiary of the federal government of the United States in Taiwan with Congressional oversight. The American Institute in Taiwan was officially created as a U.S. government-sponsored nonprofit, private corporation established under the auspices of the U.S. government to serve its interests in Taiwan.

Primarily staffed by employees of the United States Department of State and local workers, the American Institute in Taiwan provides consular services normally offered by United States diplomatic missions, with the Great Seal of the United States hung at the main office in Taipei. The establishment of diplomatic relations with the People's Republic of China (PRC) in 1979 required the United States to develop its own "One China policy" and subsequently to terminate official diplomatic relations with the Republic of China (Taiwan). The American Institute now serves to assist and protect U.S. interests in Taiwan in a quasiofficial manner, and also processes U.S. visas and provides consular services to U.S. expatriates. Following the passage of the 2018 Taiwan Travel Act by the United States, it now serves as a high-level representative bureau on behalf of United States in Taiwan. It receives full protection from the United States Marine Corps as do U.S. embassies.

== Overview ==
The American Institute in Taiwan is a nonprofit corporation established pursuant to the Taiwan Relations Act to manage America's unofficial relationship with Taiwan; it was incorporated in the District of Columbia on 16 January 1979 after the U.S. established full diplomatic relations with the PRC on January 1, 1979. This model, with an alternative form of American representative office established in Taiwan after the diplomatic relations were severed, was based on the Institute's Japanese counterpart stationed in Taipei since 1972, and was therefore referred to as the Japanese Model.

Following the authorization of the Taiwan Relations Act, the Department of State, through a semiofficial contract with the American Institute in Taiwan, provides guidance and "funds a large part of the Institute's operations." Like other U.S. missions abroad, the American Institute in Taiwan is staffed by employees of the Department of State and other agencies of the United States, as well as by locally hired staff. Prior to a 2002 amendment to the Foreign Service Act (Section 503 of the Foreign Service Act of 1980, as amended by the Foreign Relations Authorization Act, Fiscal Year 2003), United States government employees were required to resign from government service for their period of assignment to the Institute. According to Section 12 (a) of the Taiwan Relations Act, agreements conducted by the American Institute in Taiwan have to be reported to Congress, just as other international agreements concluded by United States and governments with which it has diplomatic relations. Thus, while relations between the U.S. and Taiwan through the American Institute are conducted on an informal basis, the U.S. government still treats the relationship within the same confines as with other states with formal diplomatic relations.

The American Institute in Taiwan has a small headquarters office in Arlington County, Virginia with its largest office located in Taipei, Taiwan. The organization also has a branch office in Taiwan's strategic southern port city of Kaohsiung. These three bureaus are known respectively as the American Institute in Taipei (AIT/T), the Kaohsiung Branch Office (AIT/K) and the Washington Headquarters (AIT/W).

The American Institute in Taipei complex at No. 100 Jinhu Road, Neihu District, Taipei, was inaugurated in 2019. From 1979 to 2019, it was located in the Daan District, on the site where the U.S. Military Advisory Group had previously been headquartered.

For the purposes of remuneration and benefits, directors of the American Institute in Taiwan hold the same rank as ambassadors and, in Taiwan, are accorded diplomatic privileges in their capacity as directors.

Its counterpart in the United States is the Taipei Economic and Cultural Representative Office.

== New compound in Taipei ==
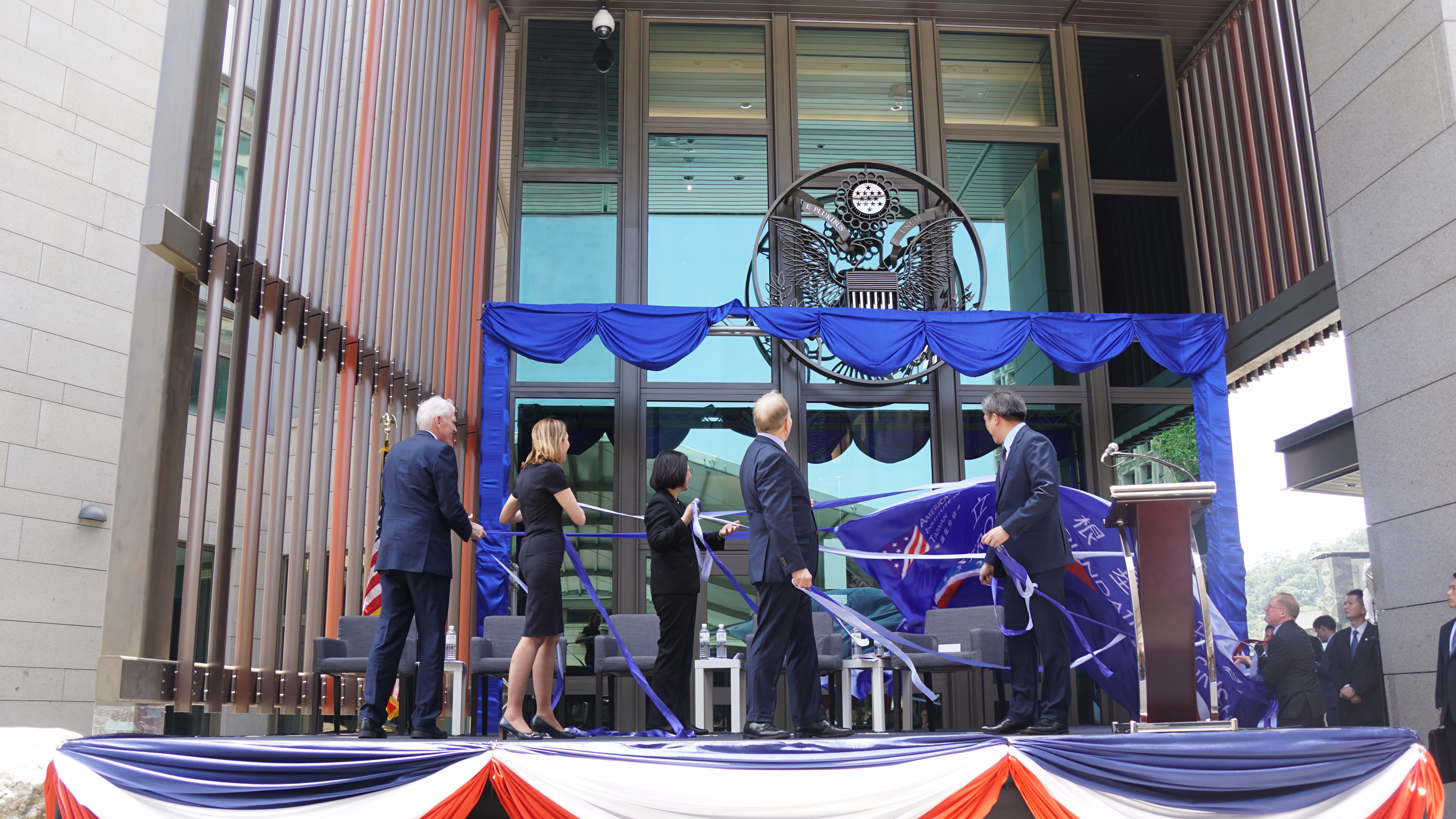
Great Seal of the United States shown at the new institute compound

A new $250 million compound for the American Institute in Taipei was unveiled in June 2018, accompanied by a "low-key" U.S. delegation and several mid-level diplomats. According to the Institute the new complex represents "the United States' brick-and-mortar commitment to Taiwan."

In 2019 director Christensen buried a time capsule at the new Institute complex in Neihu. The time capsule is not to be unearthed for 50 years.

== Principal officers ==
=== List of directors ===
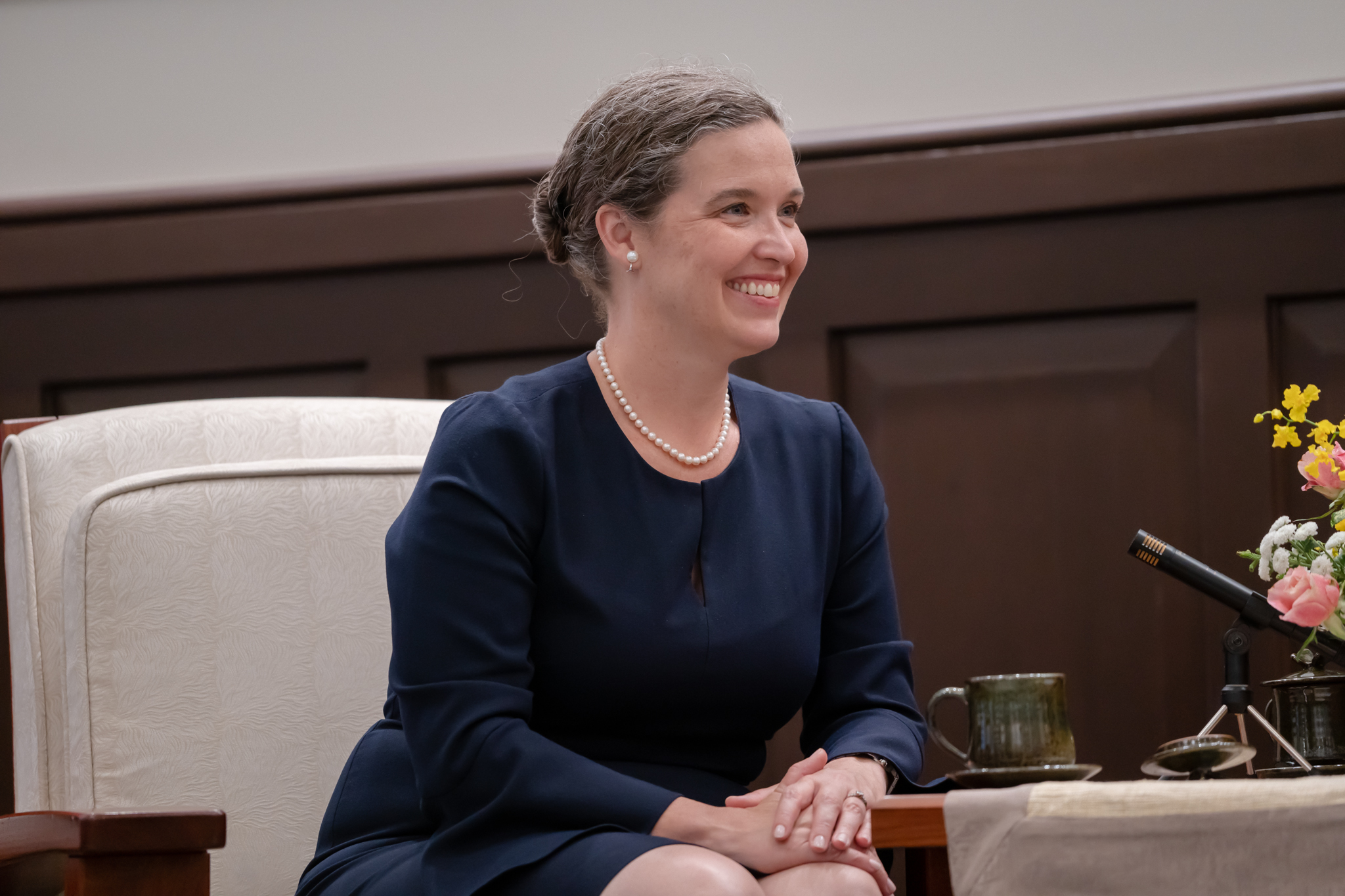
Former Director Oudkirk

- Charles T. Cross (1979–1981)
- James R. Lilley (1981–1984)
- Harry E. T. Thayer (1984–1986)
- David Dean (1987–1989)
- Thomas S. Brooks (1990–1993)
- B. Lynn Pascoe (1993–1996)
- Darryl Norman Johnson (1996–1999)
- Raymond Burghardt (1999–2001, received the Order of Propitious Clouds)
- Douglas H. Paal (2002–2006)
- Stephen Young (2006–2009)
- William A. Stanton (2009–2012)
- Christopher J. Marut (2012–2015)
- Kin W. Moy (2015–2018)
- Brent Christensen (2018–2021)
- Sandra Oudkirk (2021–2024)
- Raymond F. Greene (2024–present)

=== List of deputy directors ===
- William A. Brown (1979)
- William Wayt Thomas Jr. (1979–1981)
- Thomas S. Brooks (1981–1983)
- Jerome C. Ogden (1983–1986)
- Scott S. Hallford (1986–1991)
- James A. Larocco (1991–1993)
- Christopher J. LaFleur (1993–1997)
- Lauren K. Moriarty (1997–1998)
- Stephen Young (1998–2001)
- Pamela J. H. Slutz (2001–2003)
- David J. Keegan (2003–2006)
- Robert S. Wang (2006–2009)
- Eric H. Madison (2009–2012)
- Brent Christensen (2012–2015)
- Robert W. Forden (2015–2018)
- Raymond F. Greene (2018–2021)
- Jeremy A. Cornforth (2021–2025)
- Karin M. Lang (2025–present)

=== List of political section chiefs ===
The Political Section, originally known as the General Affairs Section (GAS), is led by a chief which is similar to a political counselor in other embassies.

Chiefs, General Affairs Section

- Mark S. Pratt (1979–1981)
- Stanley R. Ifshin (1981–1983)
- David E. Reuther (1983–1985)
- Joseph J. Borich (1985–unknown)
- Thomas V. Biddick (1989– unknown)
- Douglas G. Spelman (unknown)
- James F. Moriarty (1995–1998)
- Eunice Reddick (1997–2000)

Chiefs, Political Section

- Joseph R. Donovan Jr. (2000–2003)
- Melvin T. L. Ang (2003–2004)
- James L. Huskey (2004–2008)
- David H. Rank (2008–2010)
- Daniel Turnbull (2010–2013)
- William Klein (2013–2016)
- Christian M. Marchant (2016–2019)
- Bradley S. Parker (2019–2022)
- Richard Jao (2022–2024)
- Michael Pignatello (2025–present)

=== List of commercial officers ===
See U.S. Commercial Service in Taiwan

- William D. McClure (1981–1986)
- Raymond Sander (1987–1997)
- William Brekke (1997–2000)
- Terry Cooke (2000–2003)
- William Marshak (2000–2006)
- Robert Leach (2000–2003)
- Gregory Loose (2003–2006)
- Gregory Wong (2006–2010)
- Helen Hwang (2010–unknown)
- Scott Pozil (2011–2013)
- Amy Chang (2010–2013)

=== List of chairpersons ===
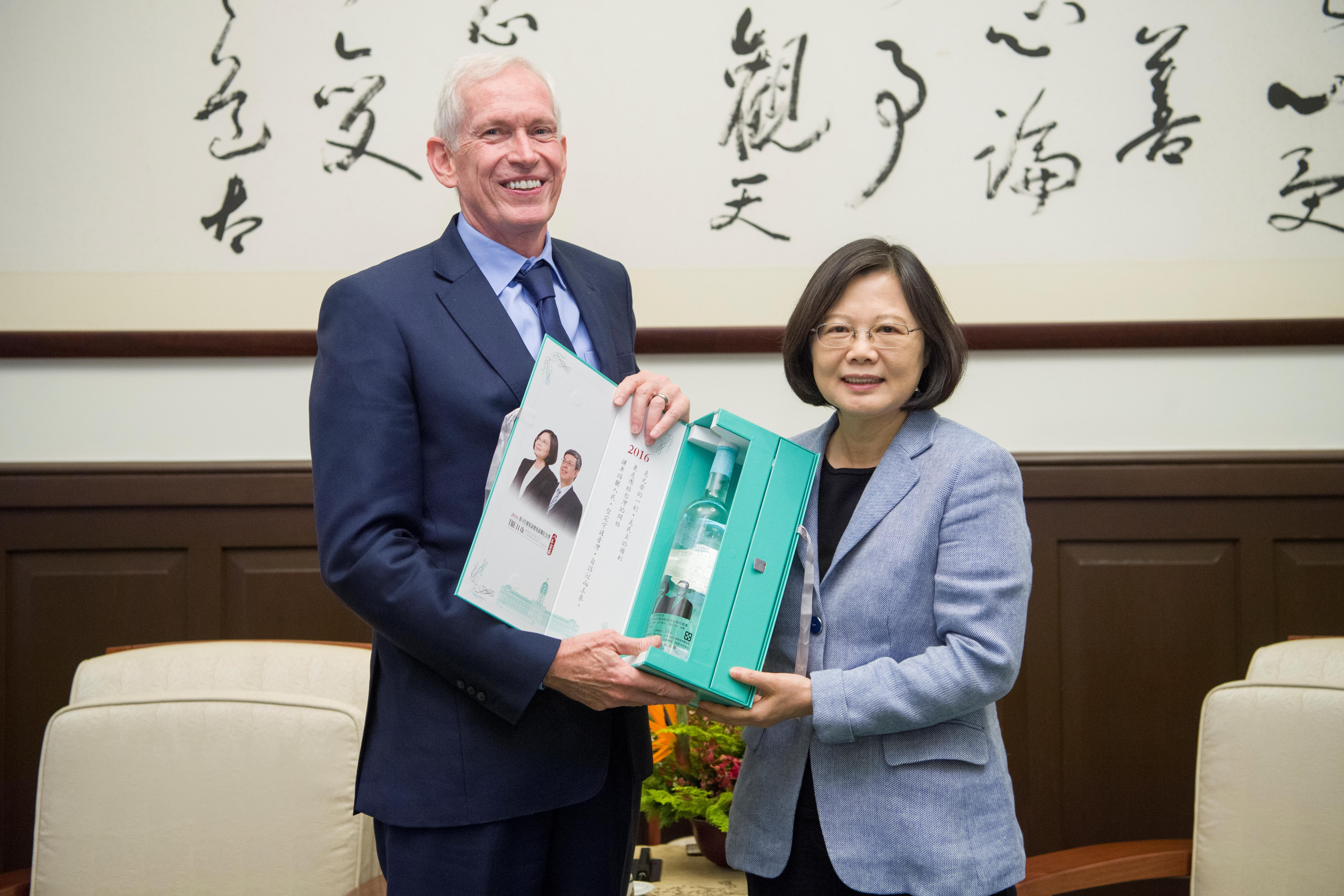
Chairman James Moriarty and President Tsai Ing-wen in 2016

- David Dean (1979–1986)
- David N. Laux (1986–1990)
- Natale H. Bellocchi (1990–1995)
- James C. Wood Jr. (1996–1997)
- Richard C. Bush (1997–2002)
- Therese Shaheen (2002–2004)
- William A. Brown (2004–2006; acting)
- Raymond Burghardt (2006–2016)
- James F. Moriarty (2016–2023)
- Laura Rosenberger (2023–2025)

== See also ==
- List of diplomatic missions of the United States
- De facto embassy
- Taiwan–United States relations
- Taipei Economic and Cultural Representative Office in the United States, its counterpart
- Foreign relations of Taiwan
- Foreign relations of the United States
- Foreign policy of the United States
