= Lee Lien-chuan =

Politician from Taiwan

- 李連權

Vice Minister of Culture of the Republic of China
- Incumbent
- Assumed office September 2016
- Minister: Cheng Li-chun; Lee Yung-te
- Deputy: Ting Hsiao-ching, Yang Tzu-pao; Hsiao Tsung-huang, Ting Hsiao-ching; Hsiao Tsung-huang, Peng Chun-heng

Personal details
- Education: Fu Jen Catholic University (BA); National Chengchi University (MA)

Lee Lien-chuan (traditional Chinese: 李連權; simplified Chinese: 李连权; pinyin: Dīng Xiǎojīng) is a Taiwanese politician. He is currently the Vice Minister of Culture since September 2016.

== Education ==
Lee obtained his bachelor's and master's degree in economics from Fu Jen Catholic University and National Chengchi University respectively.

== See also ==
- Culture of Taiwan
