= Joseph Chen =

Taiwanese politician

- 陳永豐

Political Deputy Minister of Culture
- In office February 2015 – 20 May 2016
- Minister: Hung Meng-chi
- Preceded by: Lee Ying-ping

Personal details
- Born: 1952 (age 73–74)
- Education: National Taiwan University (BA)

Joseph Chen (Chinese: 陳永豐; pinyin: Chén Yǒngfēng; Wade–Giles: Chen^{2} Yung^{3}-fung^{1}; born 1952) is a Taiwanese politician who was the Political Deputy Minister of Culture from February 2015 until May 2016.

== Education ==
Chen obtained his bachelor's degree in foreign language and literature from National Taiwan University.

== See also ==
- Ministry of Culture (Taiwan)
