= Lee Ying-ping =

Taiwanese non-profit leader and politician

- 李應平

Political Deputy Minister of Culture
- In office August 2013 – February 2015
- Minister: Lung Ying-tai; Hung Meng-chi
- Administrative Deputy: George Hsu
- Preceded by: Lin Chin-tien
- Succeeded by: Joseph Chen

Personal details
- Born: 1969 (age 56–57)
- Education: Soochow University (BA)

Lee Ying-ping (Chinese: 李應平; pinyin: Li Yīngpíng; Wade–Giles: Li^{3} Ying^{4}-ping^{2}; born 1969) is a Taiwanese non-profit leader and politician who previously served as a top aide in the Taiwanese Minister of Culture from 2013 to 2015. She is currently the CEO of the Lovely Taiwan Foundation.

== Early life and education ==
Lee received her bachelor's degree in sociology from Soochow University.

== Career ==
Lee was a researcher at the Taipei City Department of Cultural Affairs under Lung Ying-tai. She then served as the director of Kwang Hwa Information and Culture Center, the cultural arm of the Taipei Economic and Cultural Office in Hong Kong. Lee was appointed the Political Deputy Minister of Culture in 2013 and served until 2015.

Lee is currently the CEO of the Lovely Taiwan Foundation.

== See also ==
- Culture of Taiwan
