= Ting Hsiao-ching =

Taiwanese politician

- 丁曉菁

Deputy Minister of Culture
- In office 20 May 2016 – 2019 Serving with Yang Tzu-pao (2016–2018) and Hsiao Tsung-huang (2018–2023)
- Minister: Cheng Li-chun
- Succeeded by: Peng Chun-heng

Personal details
- Education: National Taiwan University (BA)

Ting Hsiao-ching (Chinese: 丁曉菁; pinyin: Dīng Xiǎojīng) is a Taiwanese politician. She is currently the Deputy Minister of Culture from 2016 to 2019.

== Education ==
Ting obtained her bachelor's degree in philosophy from National Taiwan University.

== See also ==
- Culture of Taiwan
