= George Hsu =

Taiwanese politician

Hsu Chiu-huang
- 許秋煌
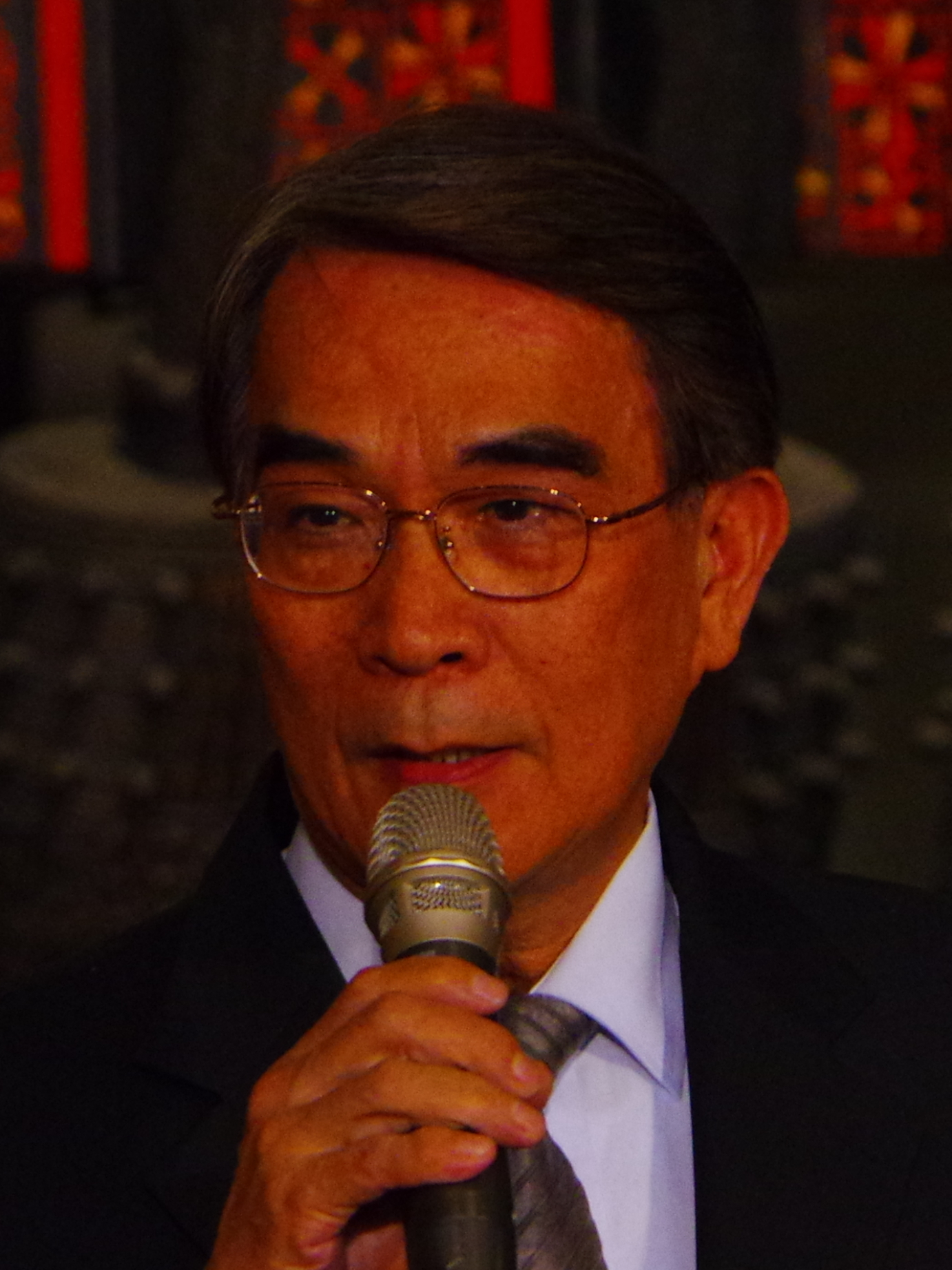
- George Hsu, 2015

Vice Minister of Culture of the Republic of China
- In office 20 May 2012 – September 2016
- Minister: Lung Ying-tai; Hung Meng-chi; Cheng Li-chun
- Deputy: Ting Hsiao-ching, Yang Tzu-pao
- Preceded by: Position established
- Succeeded by: Lee Lien-chuan

Vice Minister of Government Information Office of the Executive Yuan
- In office January 2009 – 20 May 2012
- Succeeded by: Position abolished

Personal details
- Born: 1952 (age 73–74)
- Education: National Taiwan University (BA, MA)

Hsu Chiu-huang (Chinese: 許秋煌; pinyin: Xǔ Qiūhuáng; born 1952), also known by his English name George Hsu, is a Taiwanese politician. He has served as the Administrative Deputy Minister of Ministry of Culture (MOC) of the Republic of China since 20 May 2012.

== Education ==
Hsu obtained his master's degree in political science from National Taiwan University.

== MOC Administrative Deputy Minister ==
=== Taiwanese low reading habit ===
During a session at the Executive Yuan in March 2013 when MOC Minister Lung Ying-tai presented a report on the strategies to boost Taiwan's publishing industries to elevate Taiwanese low reading habit, Hsu said that the MOC will try to help local publishers to go into Mainland China market by asking Beijing to lower down the tariffs of Taiwanese books during ECFA negotiation.
