= Chang Yui-tan =

Taiwanese museum curator (born 1951)

Chang Yui-tan (Chinese: 張譽騰; pinyin: Zhāng Yùténg; Pe̍h-ōe-jī: Tiuⁿ Ū-thêng; born 4 August 1951) is a Taiwanese museum curator.

== Life and career ==
Chang was born in Taipei on 4 August 1951. He studied animal science and technology at National Taiwan University and chose to further his studies in animal science at Western Kentucky University. In 1980, Chang began working at the National Taiwan Museum. The job, which he held for three years, inspired Chang to pursue museum studies. After leaving the NTM, Chang became a member of the preparatory committee of the National Museum of Natural Science, which was headed by Han Pao-teh, the founding director. Chang served as founding editor-in-chief of the journal Museology Quarterly. Upon graduating from the University of Leicester with a doctorate in 1993, Chang became the first person in Taiwan to earn a degree in museum studies via the Ministry of Education scholarship program. In 1996, Chang accepted a position at the Tainan National University of the Arts (TNNUA) as an art professor. During his time on the faculty, he established Taiwan's first graduate institute of museology at TNNUA and helped draft the Museum Act. Chang later served as vice chairman of the Council of Cultural Affairs under culture minister Huang Pi-twan.

in 2010, Chang was named director of the National Museum of History. During his tenure, he digitalized museum archives. Notable exhibitions held while Chang was the museum's director included Golden Age of the Qing in 2011, with artifacts on loan from the Shenyang Palace Museum, a display featuring rare pop-up books in 2012, and a vampire exhibit in 2014. Notable acquisitions by the museum under Chang's leadership included an archive of photographs from the Paper Windmill Theatre, placed in permanent collection in 2012. In 2013, Chang was elected president of the Chinese Association of Museums. Since leaving the National Museum of History in January 2017, Chang took an interest in the history of Kinmen, and called for a museum commemorating the poet Luo Fu to be built there.
