= Wu Chin-fa =

Taiwanese writer (born 1954)

- 吳錦發
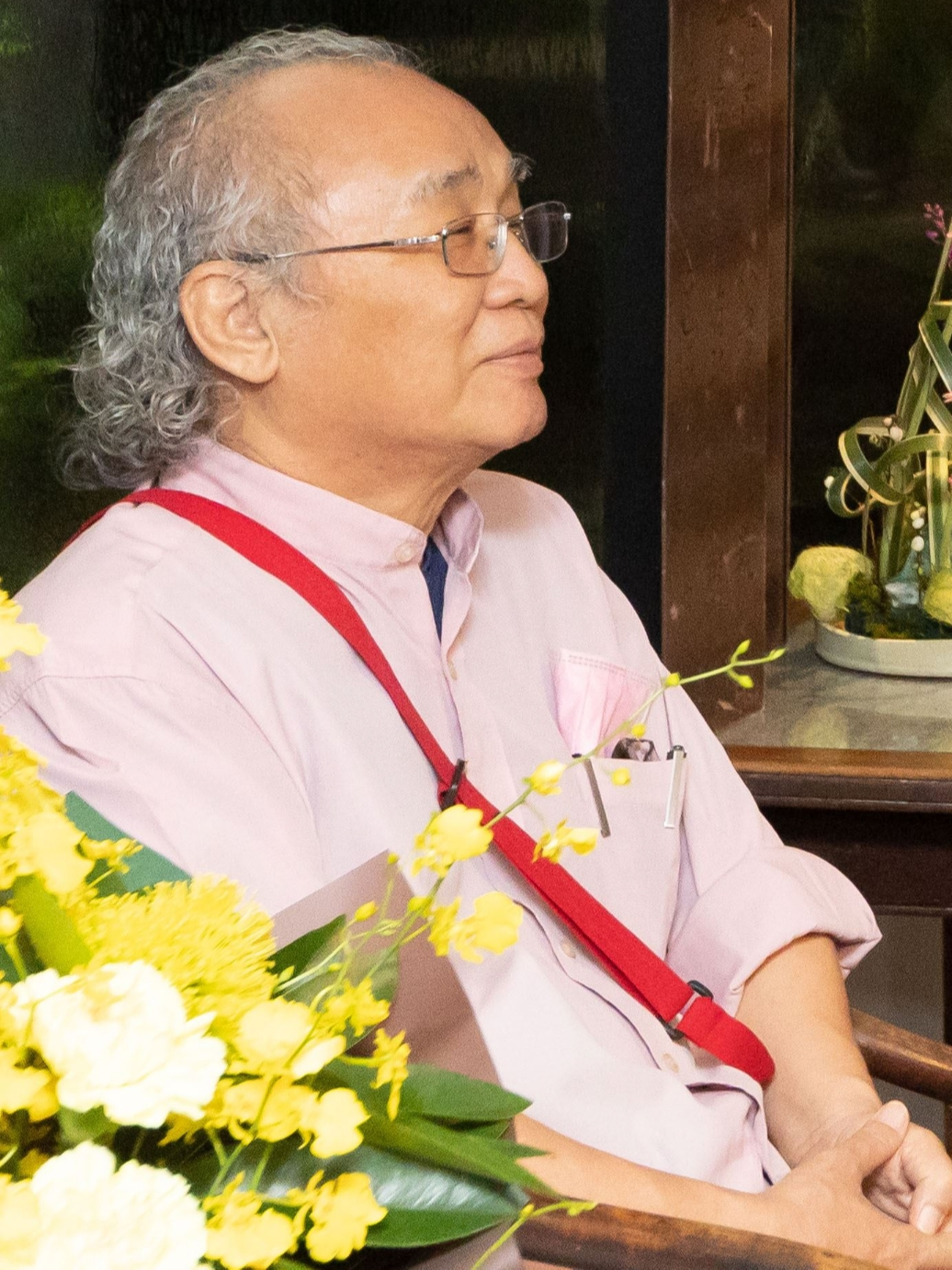
- Wu in 2023

Vice Chairman of the Council for Cultural Affairs
- In office 8 June 2004 – 19 May 2008
- Minister: Chen Chi-nan; Chiu Kun-liang; Wong Chin-chu; Wang Tuoh
- Preceded by: Wu Mi-cha
- Succeeded by: Chang Yui-tan

Personal details
- Born: 14 September 1954 (age 71) Meinong, Kaohsiung, Taiwan
- Education: National Chung Hsing University (BA)

Chinese name
- Traditional Chinese: 吴錦發
- Simplified Chinese: 吳锦发
Transcriptions
Standard Mandarin
- Hanyu Pinyin: Wú Jǐnfā

Wu Chin-fa (born 14 September 1954) is a Taiwanese writer of Hakka and indigenous descent. He was vice chairman of the Council of Cultural Affairs from 2004 to 2008, and later served as director of the Cultural Affairs Department within Pingtung County Government.

== Early life and career ==
Wu was born on 14 September 1954, in Meinong, Kaohsiung, Taiwan. He is of Hakka and indigenous descent. Wu earned his bachelor's degree in sociology at National Chung Hsing University. He was an editorial writer for Taiwan Daily and hosted a talk show.

Wu's writing often explores ethnic conflict on Taiwan from the perspective of youths. His books include Street of Crying Swallows (1985); The Autumn Chrysanthemum (1988); Spring and Autumn Tea House (1988); and A Boyhood Trilogy (2005). The Autumn Chrysanthemum became the basis of the film Youth Without Regret.

== Political career ==
Wu contested the Sanmin District seat on the Kaohsiung City Council during the 2002 municipal elections, representing the Taiwan Solidarity Union. He and another TSU candidate, Chen Ying-tsan, split the vote, and neither were elected. In November 2003, legislator Chiu Yi accused Chang Hsia, Shieh Jhy-wey, Lin Kuei-you, and Wu of writing for Special Report, a series ridiculing active politicians produced by Bi-sheng Broadcasting. The parties involved exchanged lawsuits. In December 2003, Chiang, Lin, Shieh, and Wu founded the online television channel F4.

On 8 June 2004, Wu was sworn in as vice chairman of the Council of Cultural Affairs (CCA), succeeding Wu Mi-cha. While in office, Wu Chin-fa spoke at several domestic cultural commemoration events, among them the 2004 Joint Outdoor Puppet Performance and Contest for Promising Young Leading Performers, for the Tsou leader Uyongʉ Yata'uyungana and Puyuma musician BaLiwakes, and at the Green Island Human Rights Arts Festival in 2008. As vice chair of the CCA, Wu also participated in international cultural outreach. He worked to preserve Losheng Sanatorium, and founded culture.tw, an English language web portal financed by the Council for Cultural Affairs and operated by the Central News Agency.

After leaving the Council for Cultural Affairs, Wu was sought for political commentary. He later became director of Pingtung County Government's Cultural Affairs Department. In this position, he supported the preservation of Makatao culture via financial help from the local government. As cultural director, Wu visited sites in Pingtung dating back to Taiwan's Qing and Japanese eras. In 2017, Wu worked with the Ministry of Culture to exhibit letters written by political prisoners during the White Terror at Pingtung County's cultural affairs office.
