= Chang Yun-cheng =

Taiwanese politician

- 張雲程

Political Deputy Minister of Culture of the Republic of China
- In office 20 May 2012 – 4 July 2013
- Minister: Lung Ying-tai
- Administrative Deputy: George Hsu
- Preceded by: Position established
- Succeeded by: Hung Meng-chi

Chang Yun-cheng (Chinese: 張雲程; pinyin: Zhāng Yúnchéng) is a Taiwanese politician. He was the Political Deputy Minister of Culture from 2012 to 2013.

== MOC Political Deputy Ministry ==
=== Appointment ===
Chang was appointed to the position of Political Deputy Minister during the inauguration ceremony of the establishment of the ROC Ministry of Culture (MOC) on 21 May 2012 from its predecessor Council for Cultural Affairs.

=== Resignation ===
Chang resigned from his position on 4 July 2013 due to health-related reason.

== See also ==
- Executive Yuan
- Culture of Taiwan
