= The Cession of Taiwan =

The Cession of Taiwan (Chinese: 讓臺記), written by Changhua intellectual Wu Te-kung, is Taiwan's first chronological history book using both the Western and lunar calendars. It chronicles the Republic of Formosa and the Japanese Invasion of Taiwan in 1895 from beginning to end. The narrative begins with the signing of the Treaty of Shimonoseki (馬關條約) on April 14, 1895 and ends on September 27 of the same year, when the body of Prince Kitashirakawa Yoshihisa (北白川宮能久親王) was returned to Tokyo.

The book describes the flight of defeated officials and the actions of soldiers and civilians against Japan. It touches upon the intellectuals' thoughts on the challenge of the changing world and the ways to adapt under a new regime. Wu Te-kung emphasized the function of writing history. Privately recording his thoughts on past history and culture during the trauma of fleeing with his entire family under the turmoil of Japanese rule, Wu thus preserved the collective memory of Taiwan's history of that period. By commenting on the merits and demerits of officials and scholars, Wu also revealed the limitations of armed resistance against Japan.

The content of the book is based on Wu Te-kung's personal experiences and observations, depicting the historical background of his change of political identity. Historian Wu Mi-cha (吳密察) regards The Cession of Taiwan as a starting point for Taiwanese people to write their own history. When writing The Cession of Taiwan, Wu Te-kung mainly employed the "chronological order", as well as retrospective and foreshadowing techniques to reconstruct the time of events. The multifaceted timeline invites the reader to piece together the whole story, enhancing the reading pleasure and artistic effect of the work.
