= Chou Kung-shin =

Taiwanese scholar, writer, historian and archaeologist

- 周功鑫
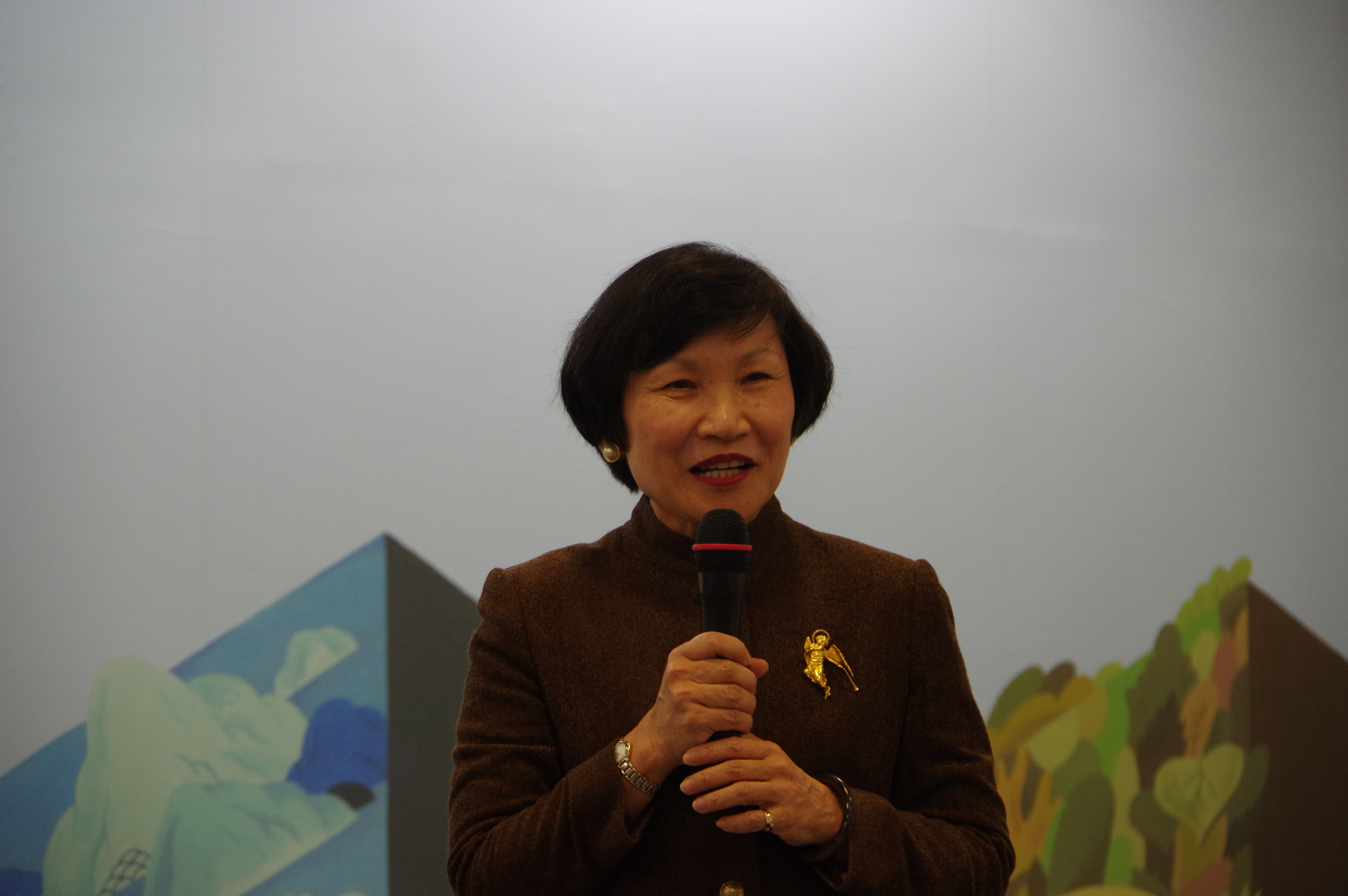
- Chou Kung-shin in 2015 in TIBE

Director of National Palace Museum
- In office 20 May 2008 – 29 July 2012
- Preceded by: Lin Mun-lee
- Succeeded by: Feng Ming-chu

Personal details
- Born: 14 April 1947 (age 79) Zhejiang, Republic of China
- Education: Fu Jen Catholic University (BA); Chinese Culture University (MA); Paris-Sorbonne University (PhD)

Chou Kung-shin (Chinese: 周功鑫; pinyin: Zhōu Gōngxīn; born 14 April 1947) is a Taiwanese scholar, writer, historian and archaeologist. She served as Director of National Palace Museum from May 2008 till July 2012.

== Life and career ==
Chou Kung-shin was born in Zhejiang on April 14, 1947. She graduated from Fu Jen Catholic University with a bachelor's degree in French studies, then earned an M.A. from Chinese Culture University and her Ph.D. from Paris-Sorbonne University in art history and archaeology. She spent 27 years working in National Palace Museum before serving as a council director of Chinese Association of Museums. She was head of Institute of Fu Jen University Museum Studies in September 2002, and held that office until May 2008. Then she became Director of National Palace Museum, and served until July 2012.

Government offices
Preceded by Lin Mun-lee	Director of National Palace Museum; 2008-2012	Succeeded by Feng Ming-chu
