= Yang Tzu-pao =

Taiwanese politician, engineer, and diplomat

- 楊子葆
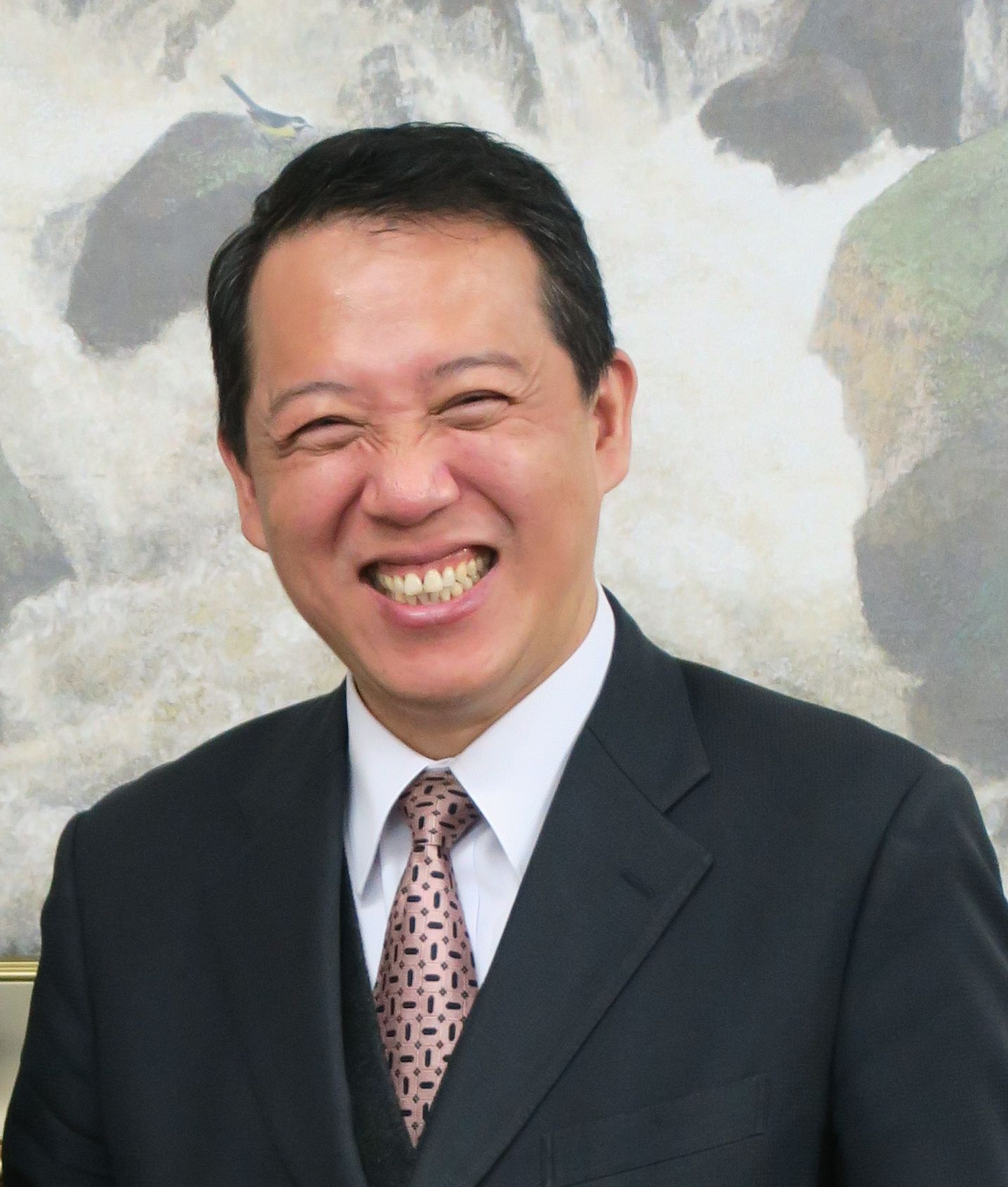

Minister of Foreign Affairs
- Acting; 6 May 2008 – 20 May 2008
- Prime Minister: Chang Chun-hsiung
- Preceded by: James C. F. Huang
- Succeeded by: Francisco Ou
Diplomatic offices
Representative of Taiwan to Ireland
In office 15 June 2018 – July 2025
President	Tsai Ing-wen; Lai Ching-te
Preceded by	Du Sheng-kuan
Succeeded by	Tang Diann-wen
Representative of Taiwan to France
In office September 2005 – September 2006
President	Chen Shui-bian
Preceded by	Chiu Jung-nan
Succeeded by	Michel Lu
Deputy ministerial offices
Deputy Minister of Culture
In office 20 May 2016 – 1 June 2018 Serving with Ting Hsiao-ching
Minister	Cheng Li-chun
Preceded by	Chen Yung-feng
Succeeded by	Hsiao Tsung-huang
Deputy Minister of Foreign Affairs
In office September 2006 – 5 May 2008
Minister	James C. F. Huang; Himself (acting)
Deputy Minister of the Overseas Community Affairs Commission
In office June 2004 – August 2005
Minister	Chang Fu-mei
4th Deputy Mayor of Hsinchu
In office April 1999 – August 2000
Mayor	James Tsai

Personal details
- Born: 8 August 1963 (age 62) Hualien County, Taiwan
- Party: Democratic Progressive Party
- Education: National Taiwan University (BS, MS); École nationale des ponts et chaussées (PhD)

Yang Tzu-pao (simplified Chinese: 杨子葆; traditional Chinese: 楊子葆; pinyin: Yáng Zibǎo; Wade–Giles: Yang^{2} Tzŭ^{3}-pao^{3}; born 8 August 1963) is a Taiwanese politician, engineer, and diplomat. He was the acting Minister of Foreign Affairs in 2008, Deputy Minister of Culture in 2016-2018 and Representative to Ireland from 2018 to 2025.

== Early life and education ==
Yang was born in Hualien County in 1963. He graduated from National Taiwan University with a bachelor's degree in agricultural engineering in 1986 and a master's degree in civil engineering in 1989. He then earned his Ph.D. in engineering from École nationale des ponts et chaussées in France in 1996. His doctoral dissertation was titled, "Bilan financier de l'automatisation intégrale des transports collectifs urbains" (English: Financial assessment of the integral automation of urban public transport).

== Early career ==
Upon his doctoral degree education completion, Yang was invited as project manager to participate in the feasibility study of the interoceanic railway in Nicaragua, Honduras, Guatemala and El Salvador. After working there for three months, Yang joined a transportation planning company THI Consultants as chief engineer.

== Political career ==
In 1999, Yang was invited by Hsinchu City Mayor James Tsai to be his deputy.

== See also ==
- Culture of Taiwan
