= Musong =

Collection of prose pieces by Lung Ying-tai

Musong cover art.

Musong (Chinese: 目送; pinyin: Mùsòng; lit. 'Seeing off'), translated as Watching You Go in English, is a collection of 74 prose pieces written by Lung Ying-tai, published in October 2009. The stories are about the relationships between Lung's family members; her father's death, her mother's aging, her children leaving, her friends' concerns for her, and working with her siblings.

This book's style is different from the critical and incisive style of Lung's other book, Big River, Big Sea. In contrast, Musong's style is gentle and lyrical. The autobiographical stories narrate Lung's failures, weakness, depression and loss, rather than present persuasive argument or describe historical occurrences.

== Critical reception ==
Wuzhong Zhou said: “...the core of Lung Ying-Tai's Musong is mercy. The feelings of mercy are reflected in every character in the book and flowing between the lines.”

“Lung Ying-Tai had said this book is written for her father, mother, and siblings. Some of the reviewers suppose that, this book is not just written for Lung's generation, it also was written to the previous (born in the 1970s and 1980s) generation and the current generation’s(born in the 2000s and 2010s) people. In this book, the child on his impending leeway to success, the mother who was almost fatally ill and the woman who stays behind in their back to watching them go--(and also the author), they are all from the various generations and they have emotions and internal conflicts, but they just express differently. Lung used her smoothly written style to wrote down three generation’s people’s emotions and lonely or shallow life, that can let all the readers from different generations to realize that; all the remorse and unwillingness is just part of the life, all we can do is moving on and look forward, to use the "now" to fill the emptiness and trauma, and reconciliation with life with love and let go.”
