= Lee Yung-te =

Taíwanese politician (born 1955)

- 李永得
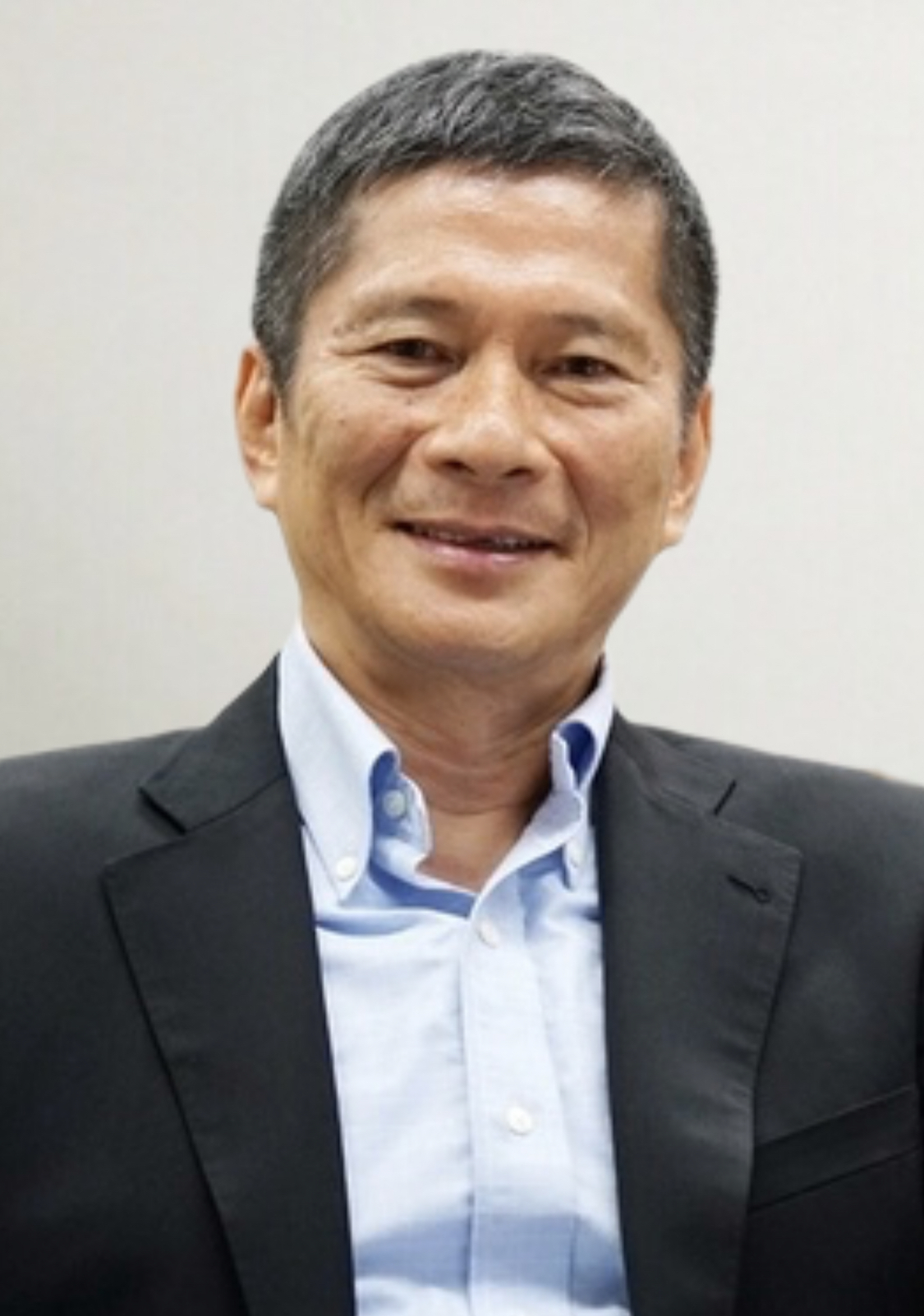
- Official portrait, 2023

10th Chairman of the Central News Agency
- In office 1 July 2023 – 1 July 2026
- Preceded by: Liu Ke-hsiang
- Succeeded by: Antonio Chiang

Minister without Portfolio
- In office 31 January 2023 – 30 June 2023
- Premier: Chen Chien-jen

4th Minister of Culture
- In office 20 May 2020 – 30 January 2023
- Premier: Su Tseng-chang
- Deputy: Deputy Minister; Hsiao Tsung-huang; Peng Chun-heng; Vice Minister; Lee Lien-chuan
- Preceded by: Cheng Li-chun
- Succeeded by: Shih Che

4th & 9th Minister of Hakka Affairs
- In office 20 May 2016 – 19 May 2020
- Premier: Lin Chuan; William Lai; Su Tseng-chang
- Deputy: Yiong Con-ziin
- Preceded by: Chung Wan-mei
- Succeeded by: Yiong Cong-ziin
- In office 15 March 2005 – 19 May 2008
- Premier: Frank Hsieh; Su Tseng-chang; Chang Chun-hsiung
- Deputy: Chiu Yi-ying; Peng Tien-fu
- Preceded by: Luo Wen-jia
- Succeeded by: Huang Yu-cheng
Additional positions
Deputy Mayor of Kaohsiung City
In office 2008–2014
Mayor	Chen Chu
Deputy Minister of Hakka Affairs Council
In office 2004–2005
Minister	Luo Wen-jia
Succeeded by	Chiu Yi-ying

Personal details
- Born: 30 May 1955 (age 71) Meinong, Kaohsiung, Taiwan
- Party: Democratic Progressive Party
- Spouse: Chiu Yi-ying (m. 2011)
- Children: 1
- Education: National Chengchi University (BA); Stanford University (MA)

Lee Yung-te (Chinese: 李永得; pinyin: Lǐ Yǒngdé; born 30 May 1955) is a Taiwanese politician. He served as the Minister of the Hakka Affairs Council from March 2005 to March 2008 and was reappointed to the position in 2016, remaining in office until 2020. He subsequently served as culture minister from 2020 to 2023, then became chairman of the Central News Agency.

== Education and early career ==
Lee graduated from National Chengchi University with a bachelor's degree in political science in 1976. He then completed graduate studies in the United States, earning a master's degree in mass communication from Stanford University in 1991.

In 1987, while working for the Independence Evening Post, Lee and colleague Hsu Lu became the first Taiwanese journalists to visit China after martial law in Taiwan had been lifted, and the Chinese Civil War had ended.

== Political career ==
On 15 March 2005, Lee was appointed acting chairman of Hakka Affairs Council. During his tenure, he organized the first Hakka Language Certification Exam in Taiwan. He also composed the first Hakka musical, My Daughter's Wedding and filmed a Hakka movie, 1895. In terms of music, he brought Hakka music into the National Concert Hall in Taipei and organized the first Hakka Expo in Taiwan.

He was reappointed to the Hakka Affairs Council in April 2016, serving until May 2020, when he was named minister of culture. Lee stepped down from the Ministry of Culture in January 2023, to assume a minister without portfolio post. In June 2023, Lee was named chairman of the Central News Agency.

== Personal life ==
Lee is of Hakka ethnicity. He has two marriages. His second wife is the member of Legislative Yuan from Kaohsiung, Chiu Yi-ying. Lee and his second wife Chiu Yi-ying registered their marriage in April 2011 and held their wedding banquet on 5 January 2013 in Kaohsiung. He and his first wife from previous marriage have a daughter born in 1988.
