= Feng Ming-chu =

Taiwanese historian

- 馮明珠
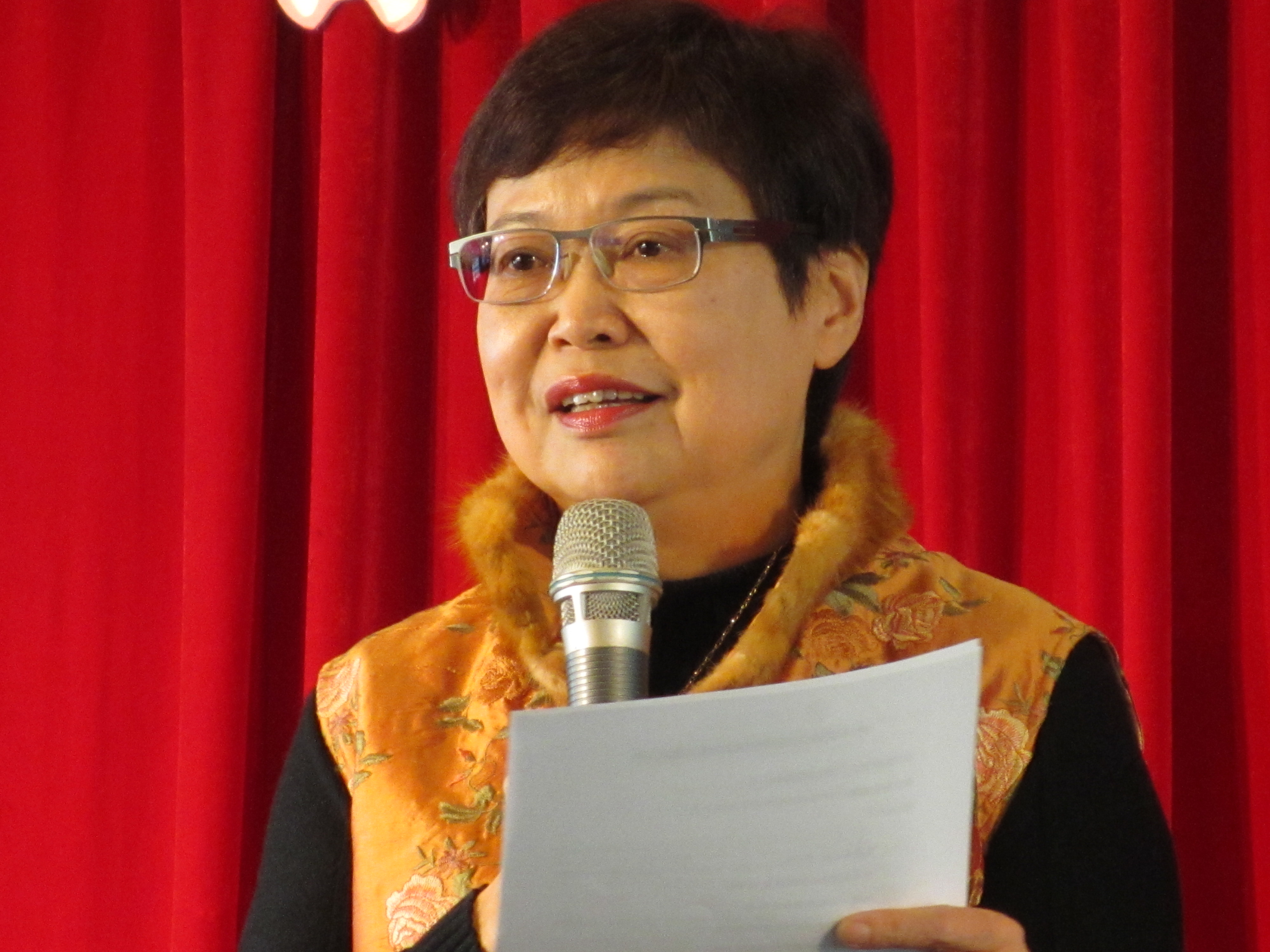

Director of National Palace Museum
- In office 18 September 2012 – 20 May 2016
- Preceded by: Chou Kung-shin
- Succeeded by: Lin Jeng-yi

Personal details
- Born: 22 July 1950 (age 75) Tiu Keng Leng, British Hong Kong
- Education: National Taiwan University (BA)
- Occupation: Historian

Chinese name
- Traditional Chinese: 馮明珠
- Simplified Chinese: 冯明珠
Transcriptions
Standard Mandarin
- Hanyu Pinyin: Féng Míngzhū

Feng Ming-chu (born 22 July 1950) is a Taiwanese historian who served as Director of National Palace Museum from September 2012 to 20 May 2016. She is also the director general of the Chinese Association of Museums and a researcher for the Mongolian and Tibetan Affairs Commission. She is an expert on the history of the Qing dynasty and Tibet.

== Early life and education ==
Feng was born in Tiu Keng Leng in British Hong Kong in 1950, with her ancestral home in Huangpi, Hubei. She graduated in 1974 from National Taiwan University, where she studied history under Li Shouli.

== Career ==
After graduation, she began working in National Palace Museum in 1978. She rose up through the ranks and served as its deputy director from May 2008 to September 2012, after which she replaced Chou Kung-shin as Director of the Museum.

Upon retirement from the position of the museum director, Feng announced her plan of accepting the position of an adviser for the Palace Museum in Beijing.

Government offices
Preceded by Chou Kung-shin	Director of National Palace Museum; 2012-2016	Succeeded by Lin Jeng-yi
