= Lin Chin-tien =

Taiwanese politician

- 林金田

Political Deputy Minister of Culture of the Republic of China
- In office 20 May 2012 – 4 July 2013
- Minister: Lung Ying-tai
- Administrative Deputy: George Hsu
- Preceded by: Position established
- Succeeded by: Lee Ying-ping

Lin Chin-tien (Chinese: 林金田; pinyin: Lín Jīntián) is a Taiwanese politician. He served as the Political Deputy Minister of Culture in the Executive Yuan of the Republic of China from 20 May 2012 to 4 July 2013.

== See also ==
- Culture of Taiwan
