= Liu Hsing-chin Comic Museum =

Museum in Hengshan, Hsinchu County, Taiwan

- 劉興欽漫畫暨發明展覽館
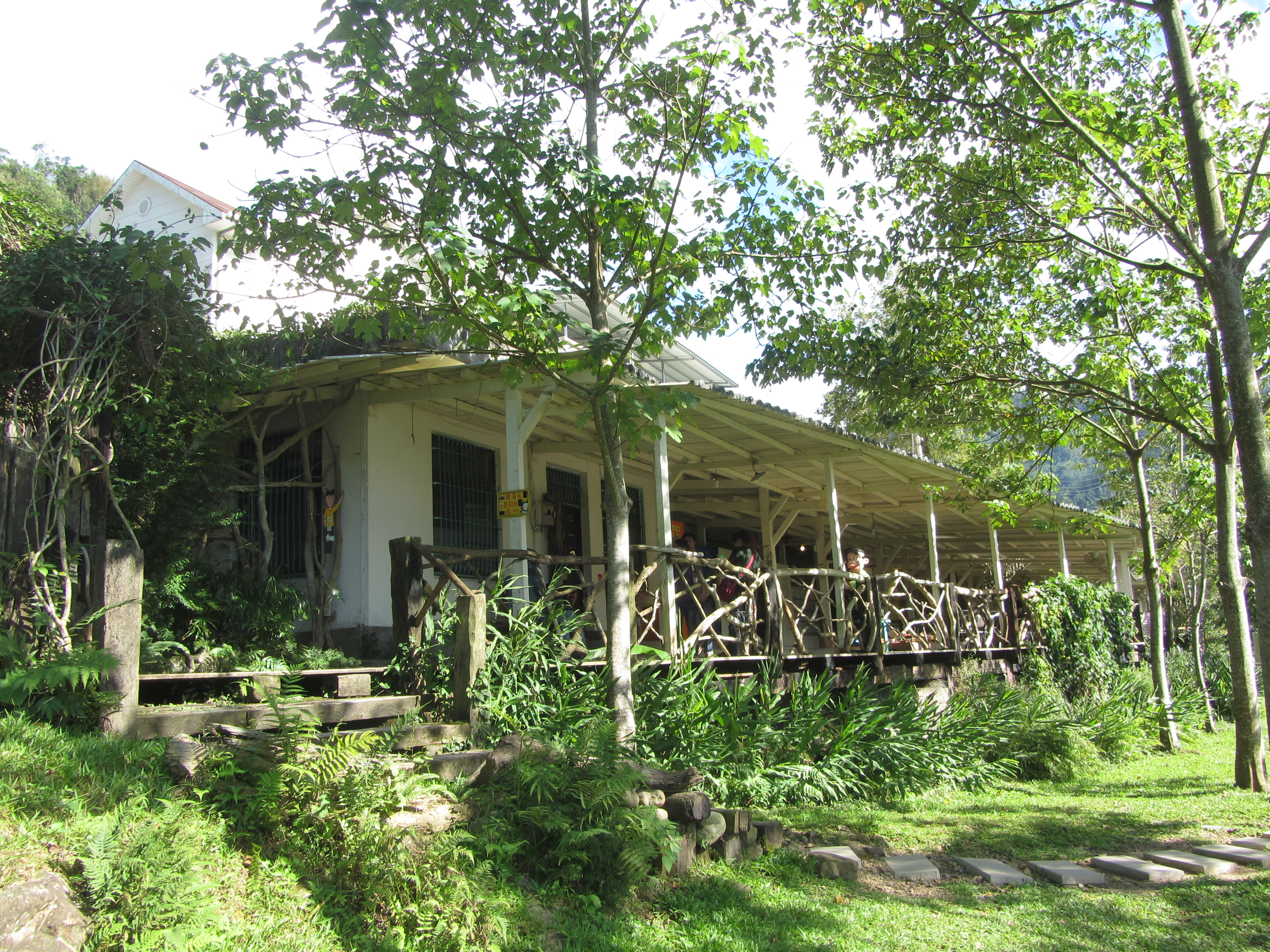
- Established: March 2005
- Location: Hengshan, Hsinchu County, Taiwan
- Coordinates: 24°42′22″N 121°10′58″E
- Type: museum
- Public transit access: Neiwan Station

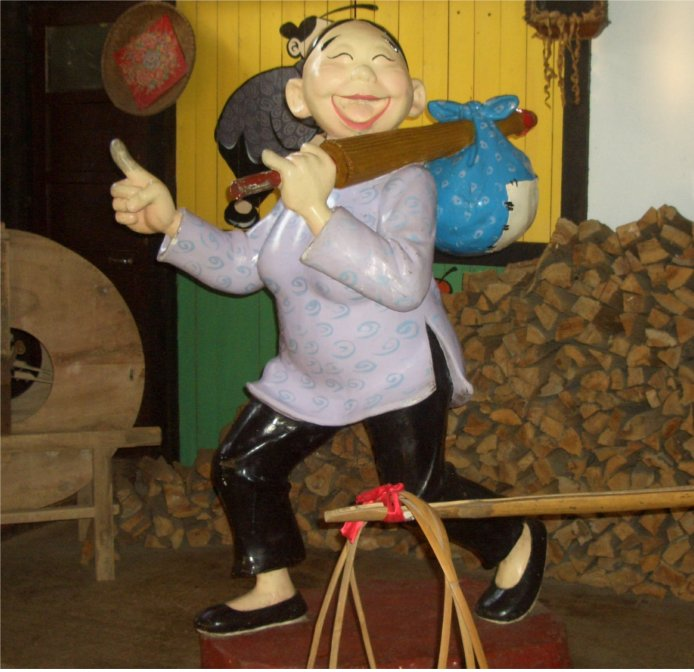
Museum exhibition

The Liu Hsing-chin Comic Museum (traditional Chinese: 劉興欽漫畫暨發明展覽館; simplified Chinese: 刘兴钦漫画暨发明展览馆; pinyin: Liúxìngqīn Mànhuà Jì Fāmíng Zhǎnlǎnguǎn) is a museum about the comics creator Liu Hsing-chin, located in Hengshan Township, Hsinchu County, Taiwan.

== History ==
The museum building used to be the old administration building of the Taiwan Railways Administration. With the help from Jiuzantou Cultural Association, funding was secured from the Council for Cultural Affairs to transform the old building to a comic wonderland. The museum opened in March 2005.

== Transportation ==
The museum is accessible within walking distance west from Neiwan Station of the Taiwan Railway.

== See also ==
- List of museums in Taiwan
