= Wu Te-kung =

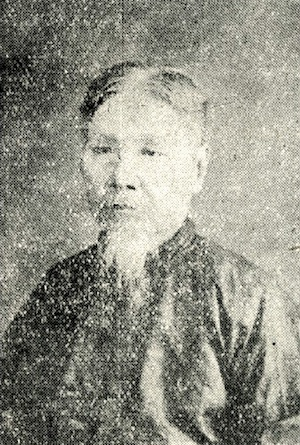
Portrait of Wu Te-kung by Government-General of Taiwan.

Wu Te-kung (Chinese: 吳德功; 1850–1924), also known by his courtesy name Ju-neng (汝能) and pseudonym Li-hsuan (立軒), was a native of Changhua, Taiwan, and one of the founders of the Chang Hwa Bank. He made significant contributions to social welfare in the Changhua region, overseeing the establishment of institutions such as the Changhua Infant Care Center, Loyalty Shrine, and Integrity and Filial Piety Shrine. In later years, he actively participated in the restoration and relocation of the Integrity and Filial Piety Shrine of Changhua. Wu's literary works include The Cession of Taiwan (讓臺記), the first chronicle in Taiwan using a dual calendar system of the Western and traditional lunar calendars. He also authored Poetry Manuscript of Juei Tao Chamber (瑞桃齋詩稿), Juei Tao Chamber Prose Anthology (瑞桃齋文稿), and A Brief History of the Rebellion of Tai Chao-chun (戴案紀略), among others.

== Activities ==
During the period of Japanese rule in Taiwan, he was involved in resistance activities, such as organizing the "Lien Chia Chu" (聯甲局, literally "Joint Defense Bureau") at the request of the Taiwan Prefectural Governor in 1895. However, after the failure of the resistance, he went into hiding. Later, due to his reputation, the Japanese authorities invited him to serve in official positions. In 1898, he took a teaching position at the Taichung Normal School and was awarded a Gentry Medal (紳章) in 1902.

In his literary activities, Wu Te-kung participated in poetry gatherings and recitations in Changhua from 1890, including being part of the Li Pu Poetry Society (荔譜吟社), founded by his mentor Tsai Te-hui (蔡德輝). In 1915, local individuals in Changhua founded the Comrades Youth Association, where Wu Te-kung taught Chinese literature. The association was formed by a new generation of intellectuals in Changhua and can be considered a supplementary class for promoting Chinese literature. In 1919, the Taiwan Literary Society was founded, and Wu participated in it. In 1920, he assumed the position of director of the society.
