= Wong Chin-chu =

Taiwanese educator and politician

- 翁金珠
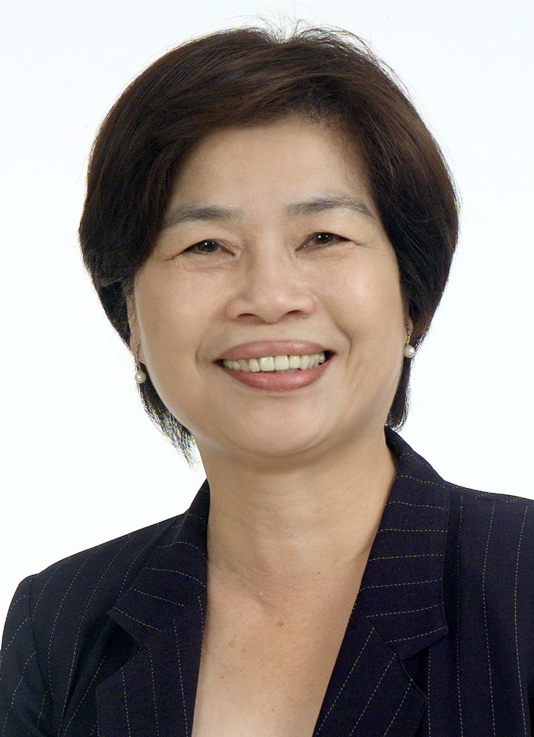

9th Minister of Cultural Affairs
- In office 21 May 2007 – 31 January 2008
- Prime Minister: Chang Chun-hsiung
- Deputy: Wu Chin-fa
- Preceded by: Chiu Kun-liang
- Succeeded by: Wang Tuoh

9th Magistrate of Changhua
- In office 20 December 2001 – 20 December 2005
- Preceded by: Juan Kang-meng
- Succeeded by: Cho Po-yuan

Member of the Legislative Yuan
- In office 1 February 2008 – 31 January 2012
- Constituency: Party-list
- In office 1 February 1993 – 20 December 2001
- Constituency: Changhua County

Personal details
- Born: 31 January 1947 (age 79) Yuanlin, Changhua County, Taiwan, Republic of China
- Party: Democratic Progressive Party
- Education: National Taiwan Normal University (BA); National Taipei University (MBA)

Wong Chin-chu (Chinese: 翁金珠; pinyin: Wēng Jīnzhū; Wade–Giles: Wōng Chīn-chū; born 31 January 1947) is a Taiwanese educator and politician. She was a member of the Legislative Yuan from 1993 to 2001. Wong stepped down in the midst of her third term, as she was elected magistrate of Changhua County later that year. She served as magistrate until 2005. In 2007, Wong was named the minister of the Council for Cultural Affairs, a position she left in 2008 to be reelected to the legislature.

== Education ==
After high school, Wong graduated from National Taiwan Normal University with a bachelor's degree in music. She then taught at primary and middle schools for 18 years before earning a Master of Business Administration (M.B.A.) from National Taipei University in 1999.

== Political career ==
Wong was elected to three consecutive terms in the Legislative Yuan in the 1990s, serving from 1993 to 2001. She became the magistrate of Changhua County in 2001 after winning the 2001 Republic of China local election, serving until 2005.

2001 Changhua County Election Results
No.	Party	Candidate	Votes	Percentage
1	PFP	Cheng Hsiu-chu (鄭秀珠)	39,056	6.37%
2	KMT	Yeh Chin-fong	257,504	41.99%
3	DPP	Wong Chin-chu	301,584	49.17%
4	Independent	Hong Can-min (洪參民)	8,219	1.34%
5	Independent	Chen Wan-zhen (陳婉貞)	6,934	1.13%

In April 2004, Wong was invited to serve as the Minister of Education, but she rejected the offer. With former chairperson Lin Yi-hsiung's support, Wong ran for chairperson of the Democratic Progressive Party (DPP) in the 2006 election. She was the only female candidate in the race, but lost nonetheless.

Wong served as Chief Commissioner of the Council for Cultural Affairs from 2007 to 2008 before returning to the legislature from 2008 until 2012.
