= Chiu Kun-liang =

Taiwanese academic and politician

- 邱坤良

Minister of Council of Cultural Affairs of the Republic of China
- In office 25 January 2006 – 20 May 2007
- Deputy: Wu Chin-fa
- Preceded by: Chen Chi-nan
- Succeeded by: Wong Chin-chu

President of the Taipei National University of the Arts
- In office 22 October 1997 – 24 January 2006
- Preceded by: Liu S. Lian
- Succeeded by: Ju Tzong-ching

Personal details
- Born: 13 February 1949 (age 77) Su'ao, Yilan County, Taiwan
- Education: Chinese Culture University (MA); Columbia University; Paris Diderot University (PhD)

Chiu Kun-liang (Chinese: 邱坤良; Pe̍h-ōe-jī: Khu Khun-liông; born 13 February 1949) is a Taiwanese academic and politician.

== Early life and education ==
Chiu Kun-liang was born on 13 February 1949, and raised in Nanfang-ao, a fishing port in Su'ao. He wrote a memoir-like bestselling book in 1999, titled The Rise and Decline of the Nan Fang Ao Theater, which drew tourists to Nanfang-ao.

Chiu earned a Master of Arts degree from Chinese Culture University in 1973, was awarded a Fulbright Scholarship for study at Columbia University in 1983, and obtained a Ph.D. in France at Paris Diderot University in 1986. From 1990 to 1991, he completed postdoctoral research at the University of California, Berkeley.

== Academic career ==
Upon completing his doctorate in 1986, Chiu began teaching at what was then the National Institute of the Arts, and was appointed director of the institution's Traditional Arts Resource Center. After his return to Taiwan, he was named head of the Department of Theatre, and taught drama. He was president of the National Institute of the Arts between October 1997 and January 2006, and presided over its name change to the Taipei National University of the Arts. The Freshmen Dance Company was formed by TNUA students the year he took office. After viewing a performance by the troupe in September 2004, Chiu was impressed by their professionalism and urged the group to change their name. The troupe then became known as Focus Dance Company. During his tenure as president of the Taipei National University of the Arts, Chiu concurrently served as chairman of the Chiang Kai-shek Cultural Center. While he served as president of TNUA, Chiu attended a ceremony to award Václav Havel the Order of Brilliant Star. He also participated in a March 2005 forum to discuss Taiwanese culture and identity.

== Political career ==
Chen Shui-bian appointed Chiu Kun-liang to his National Policy Advisory Committee prior to taking office as President of the Republic of China in 2000. Chiu joined the Su Tseng-chang-led Executive Yuan in January 2006, as chairman of the Council of Cultural Affairs. As CCA chair, Chiu discussed starting a biennial focusing on the culture of Taiwanese indigenous peoples. In late 2006, Chiu commented on plans for what would become Huashan 1914 Creative Park and National Kaohsiung Center for the Arts. In his capacity as council chair, Chiu addressed the International Council of Museums 2006 conference, and attended the 2007 Taipei International Book Exhibition in January, as well as the March 2007 funeral for puppeteer Huang Hai-tai. That same month, Chiu commented on a draft bill regarding protections for languages spoken in Taiwan. In April 2007, legislators Gao Jyh-peng, Charles Chiang, and Huang Chao-hui alleged that Chiu was rigging the bids submitted for the restoration of Huashan 1914 Creative Park. When the Su Tseng-chang cabinet stepped down in May 2007, Wong Chin-chu replaced Chiu as head of the Council of Cultural Affairs.

== Later career ==
During and after his tenure as chairman of the Council of Cultural Affairs, Chiu wrote several editorials on arts, culture, and politics that were translated and published in the Taipei Times. He later returned to teaching at Taipei National University of the Arts.
