= Medal of Culture =

Taiwanese civil decoration created in 2020

Medal of Culture (文化獎)

Awarded by Ministry of Culture (Taiwan)
- Established: 2020
- Country: Taiwan

Statistics
- First induction: 2020

The Medal of Culture (Chinese: 文化獎) is a Taiwanese civil decoration created in 2020.

There are three levels.

It was awarded for the first time in Paris on February 3, 2020.
