= Lovely Taiwan Foundation =

Taiwanese private foundation

Lovely Taiwan Foundation 台灣好基金會
- Formation: 2009; 17 years ago
- Headquarters: Taipei, Taiwan
- Key people: Ko Wen-chang (founder and chairman); Lee Ying-ping (CEO)
- Website: new.lovelytaiwan.org.tw

The Lovely Taiwan Foundation (Chinese: 台灣好基金會) is a private foundation established by Taiwanese venture capitalist Ko Wen-chang in 2009. The foundation aims to revitalize Taiwanese villages and towns by helping them market their products and tourism.

== History ==
Established in 2009, the Lovely Taiwan Foundation implemented some of its first initiatives in Chihshang, Taitung. The annual Autumn Harvest Festival has featured musicians A-Mei and Wu Bai, as well as Cloud Gate Dance Theatre, over the years. In addition, the foundation set up a shop in Taipei to promote tribal crafts from indigenous communities and products from independent small farms in rural Taiwan.

=== Typhoon Morakot relief ===
In August 2009, Taiwan saw the deadliest typhoon to impact its shores in recorded history, and Taimali in Taitung County was especially hard hit. The Lovely Taiwan Foundation organized a charity concert and raised NT$10 million for the disaster relief in Tamali. Two full-time employees were sent to Taimali and oversee the construction of a public plaza to allow for tribal rituals and social gatherings.

Working with the local Paiwan community for about 3 years, the plaza was reconstructed with traditional symbols and patterns such as hundred-pace snakes and mountain hawk-eagle feathers.

=== Subsequent projects ===
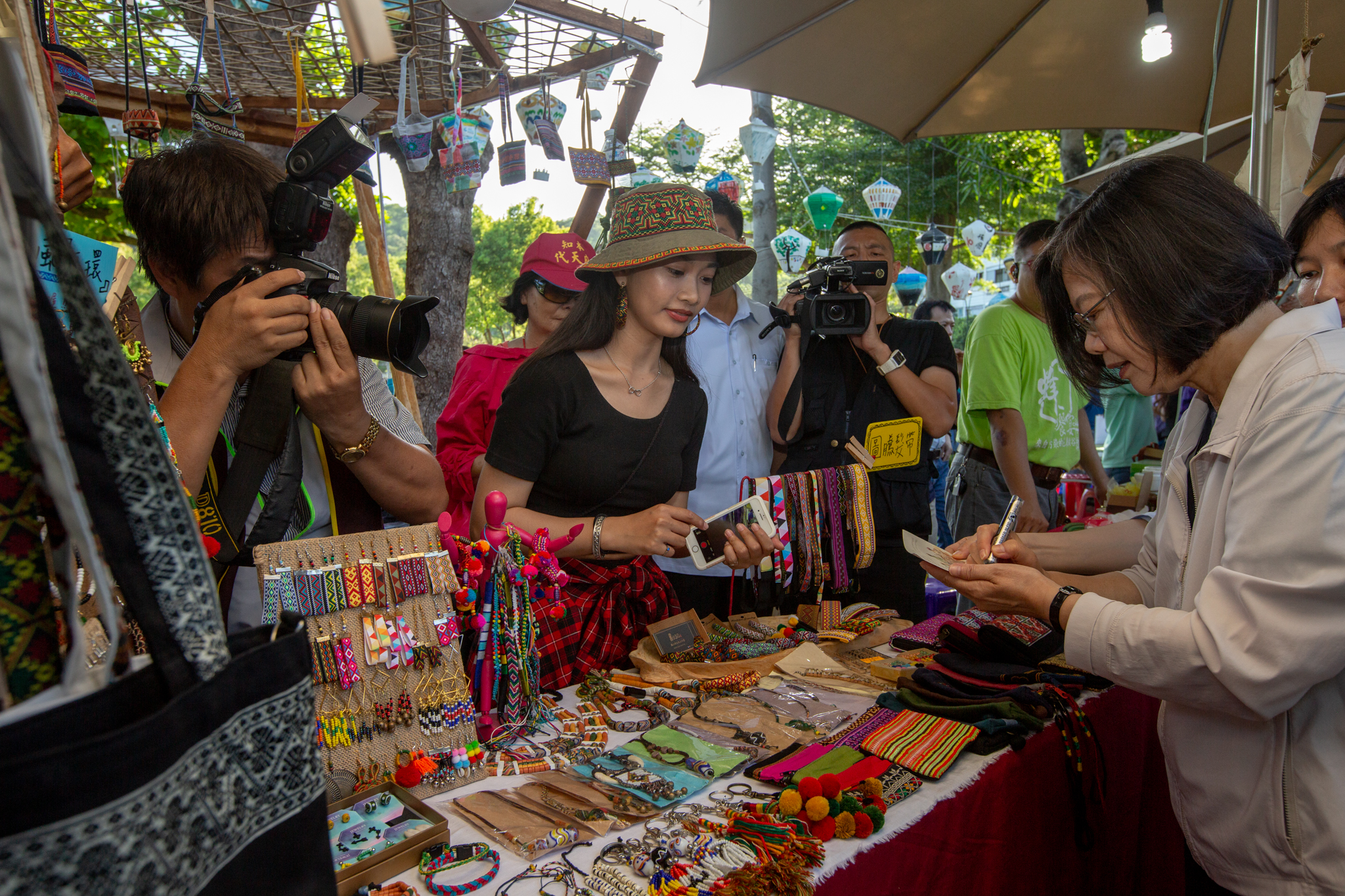
President Tsai Ing-wen visits Tiehua Village in 2019

In 2010, the Lovely Taiwan Foundation established Tiehua Music Village in Taitung County to promote indigenous music and culture, building a venue that hosted various singers such as Crowd Lu. The foundation announced the closure of Tiehua in 2023, after 13 years of operations. CEO Lee Ying-ping explained that foundation had an original goal of a revitalized music scene in the area, and the project had achieved this goal by boosting the local economic and cultural development.

In 2015, the Lovely Taiwan Foundation officially launched its artist-in-residence program in Chihshang. In the same year, it launched Project Shennong (神農計畫), which is modeled after the farm-to-school program of the United States Department of Agriculture. The foundation seeks out businesses to sponsor 15 programs at rural elementary schools in Miaoli County and Pingtung County.

== Funding ==
Asset management firm Fuh Hwa Securities (復華投信) has contributed to the Chihshang project.
