= Yiong Con-ziin =

Taiwanese politician

- 楊長鎮
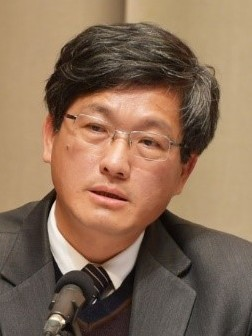

Minister of the Hakka Affairs Council
- In office 20 May 2020 – 20 May 2024
- Preceded by: Lee Yung-te
- Succeeded by: Ku Hsiu-fei

Deputy Minister of the Hakka Affairs Council
- In office 20 May 2016 – 19 May 2020
- Minister: Lee Yung-te

Personal details
- Born: 22 April 1963 (age 62) Shitan, Miaoli County, Taiwan
- Party: Democratic Progressive Party
- Education: Tunghai University (BA)

Yiong Con-ziin (Chinese: 楊長鎮; pinyin: Yáng Chángzhèn; born 22 April 1963) is a Taiwanese politician. He worked in several capacities within the Democratic Progressive Party and was named minister of the Hakka Affairs Council on 20 May 2020.

== Early life and education ==
Yiong was born on 22 April 1963. He was raised in Shitan, Miaoli, and speaks Taiwanese Hakka. He is a graduate of Tunghai University.

== Career ==
In 1990, Yiong began working for Yeh Chu-lan. Yiong was appointed to the Hakka Affairs Council in 2001, the year it was founded. By 2004, Yiong had become leader of the Democratic Progressive Party's Ethnic Affairs Department. As director of the Ethnic Affairs Department, Yiong backed initiatives reaching out to Taiwanese indigenous people and those of Mainland Chinese descent. During his tenure, the party passed the Resolution on Ethnic Diversity and National Unity, and issued a report on Japanese rule in Taiwan. In 2005, the DPP Ethnic Affairs Department produced a documentary about the sinking of the Taiping on 27 January 1949. The Democratic Progressive Party nominated Yiong to contest the Miaoli County magistracy in 2005, which he lost to Liu Cheng-hung. Yiong subsequently returned to the Department of Ethnic Affairs. By 2009, Yiong had become the leader of the DPP Department of Social Movement. In December of that year, he again sought the Miaoli County magistracy, which Liu Cheng-hung retained. By 2011, Yiong was reappointed to the DPP's Ethnic Affairs Department. The party backed his 2012 legislative bid in Miaoli. During his own campaign, Yiong analyzed the Tsai Ing-wen presidential bid with regard to Hakka voters. Yiong and other Hakka drew attention to the lack of promotion and resources devoted to the culture under the Ma Ying-jeou administration. After losing the legislative election, Yiong worked for Thinking Taiwan, an organization affiliated with Tsai Ing-wen, as director of its Social Force Development Center. By 2015, Yiong returned to work for the Democratic Progressive Party, serving as director of the Taiwan Academy for Democracy. From 20 May 2016, Yiong served as deputy minister of the Hakka Affairs Council under Lee Yung-te. Yiong replaced Lee as leader of the Hakka Affairs Council after Lee was named culture minister at the start of Tsai Ing-wen's second presidential term.

Outside of the Democratic Progressive Party, Yiong has supported a number of causes as an activist. He was a member of the Culture and History Council at the Community Construction Society and the Alliance to Preserve Four Four South Village as a National Relic. Both organizations supported the preservation of Four Four South Village as a historic site. Yiong's continued activism led to him becoming a founding member of Taiwan Friends of Tibet, and Taiwan Friends of Uyghurs. Yiong has served as the deputy chairman of Taiwan Friends of Tibet, and the executive director of the Deng Liberty Foundation. While affiliated with Taiwan Friends of Tibet, Yiong called for the government to grant asylum to Tibetans in Taiwan, distributed flyers at the Taipei Zoo, participated in several commemorations of the 1959 Tibetan uprising, and petitioned the Ma Ying-jeou presidential administration regarding human rights in Tibet.
