= Lung Ying-tai =

Taiwanese pundit & cultural minister

Lung Ying-Tai
- 龍應台
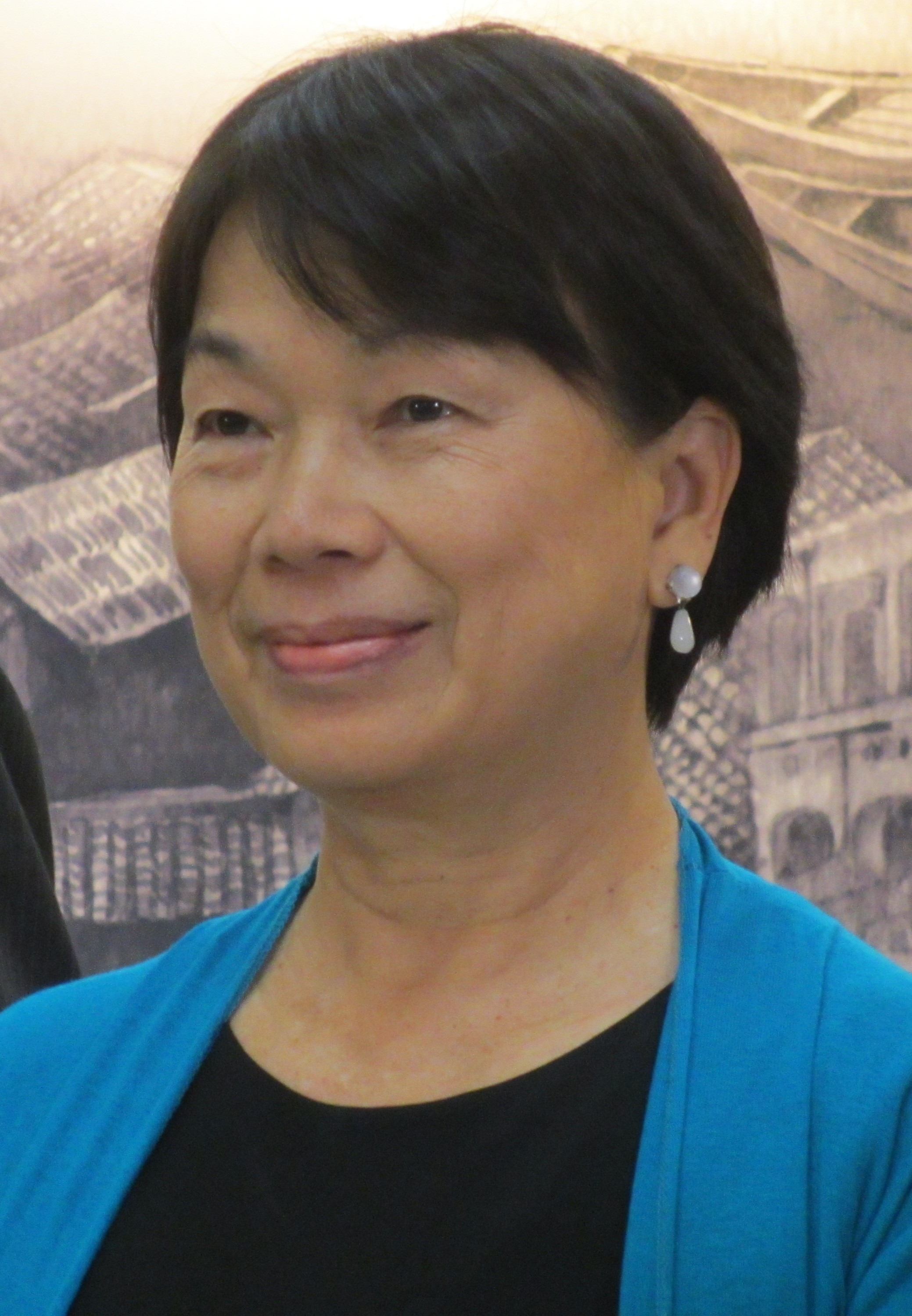
- Lung in 2014

1st Minister of Culture (Minister of Council for Cultural Affairs until 19 May 2012)
- In office 6 February 2012 – 7 December 2014
- President: Ma Ying-jeou
- Deputy: Chang Yun-cheng, Lin Chin-tien; George Hsu, Hung Meng-chi, Lee Ying-ping
- Preceded by: Ovid Tzeng; Lin Chin-tian (acting)
- Succeeded by: Hung Meng-chi

Personal details
- Born: 13 February 1952 (age 74) Daliao, Kaohsiung, Taiwan
- Children: Two sons
- Education: National Cheng Kung University (BA); Kansas State University (PhD)

Lung Ying-tai (Chinese: 龍應台; pinyin: Lóng Yìngtái) is a Taiwanese writer and public intellectual. She has written more than 30 books. Lung served as Taiwan's first Minister of Culture from 2012 to 2014 under the Ma Ying-jeou administration.

== Early life and education ==
Lung Ying-tai was born in 1952 to a waishengren family in Daliao, Kaohsiung. Her father, Lung Huai-sheng (龍槐生), left his home in Hunan and joined the Kuomintang (KMT) army at the age of 15. Her parents fled mainland China after the KMT lost the Chinese Civil War in 1949 and migrated to Taiwan during the Great Retreat. She was raised in several fishing and farming villages in central and southern Taiwan, as opposed to a military dependents' village.

After graduating from National Tainan Girls' Senior High School, Lung obtained her bachelor's degree in foreign languages and literature from National Cheng Kung University. She then completed doctoral studies in the United States, earning her Ph.D. in English and American literature from Kansas State University in 1982.

== Career ==
=== Early career, 1983-1999 ===
Taiwan was under Kuomintang's one-party rule when Lung Ying-tai returned to Taiwan in 1983. She started an op-ed column in the China Times, delivering reflections and critiques of contemporary Taiwan society. These essays were published collectively in 1985 as a compilation titled Ye Huo Ji (野火集, The Wild Fire Collection). The book went through 24 reprints in 21 days, garnering so much attention that poet Yu Kwang-chung referred to its impact as that of a "tornado" (the phrase in Chinese, Longjuanfeng, was a pun on Lung's name). It became "the best-selling and most-talked-about book of the decade in Taiwan," and was regarded as influential in the island's democratization process.

Lung moved to Europe with her husband in 1986. During her time in Europe, she remained prolific, authoring the following books: Ren Zai Ouzhou (人在歐洲, 1988, The Mundane and the Lofty—Journey through Europe), Xie Gei Taiwan de Xin (寫給台灣的信, 1992, Letters to Home), Kan Shiji Mo Xiang Ni Zou Lai (看世紀末向你走來, 1994, Living in a "Fin de siècle"), Haizi Ni Manman Lai (孩子你慢慢來, 1994, Take Your Time, My Children), Mei Li De Quan Li (美麗的權利, 1994, The Right to Seduce), Zai Heidebao Zhui Ru Qing Wang (在海德堡墜入情網, 1995, In the Shadows of Heidelberg: A Tale of Love and Fate), Gan Bei Ba Tuomasiman (乾杯吧托馬斯曼, 1996, Cheers, Thomas Mann), Wo De Bu An (我的不安, 1997, Our Age of Uncertainty), Ah! Shanghai Nan Ren (啊！上海男人, 1998, Shanghai Men), and Bainian Sisuo (百年思索, 1999, Reflections of this Century). Lung writes in more than one language and for more than one audience. "It is not unusual for her to publish an essay simultaneously in Taipei's China Times and Shanghai's Wen Hui Bao, with the German version appearing in the Frankfurter Allgemein, and the English version on the BBC's European service." Her work has appeared in mainland Chinese newspapers since the early 1990s. In 1994, she criticized the Singaporean government's restrictions on personal freedom in 1994 in an article titled, "Thank God I Am Not Singaporean" (幸好我不是新加坡人).

=== Return to Taipei for public service, 1999-2003 ===
In 1999, Taipei Mayor Ma Ying-jeou traveled to Germany and invited Lung to serve as the first Director of Taipei City's Cultural Bureau. She came back to Taiwan and assumed the role in September 1999. During her tenure, she designed and implemented policies that increased the visibility of the arts in the city and restored and transformed 20 historical sites including Songshan Cultural and Creative Park, the Mayor's Residence Art Salon, Huashan Creative Park, Taipei Film House, Wistaria Tea House, Treasure Hill, Chien Mu House, and Lin Yutang House, among others. The Cultural Bureau listed and protected 1,146 old trees, rescued 276 from being removed, and enacted the "Taipei City Tree Protection Ordinance," the first of its kind in Taiwan. Lung also promoted cultural exchanges between local and international artists—more than 50 artists from all over the world visited Taipei between 1999 and 2002 through the city's artist-in-residence program. She completed her tenure in March 2003 and accepted a Visiting Professorship at the City University of Hong Kong.

=== Engagement through writing and NGO work in Hong Kong and Taiwan, 2003-2012 ===
She served as a visiting professor at the City University of Hong Kong during 2003-2004 and continued this role at the Journalism and Media Studies Centre of the University of Hong Kong.

She resumed her writing career and published two books in 2003, Yinse Xianrenzhang: Long Yingtai Xiaoshuo Ji (銀色仙人掌: 龍應台小說集, Death by the Silver Cactus: A Collection of Short Stories) and Miandui Dahai de Shihou (面對大海的時候, When Facing the Sea). In the latter Lung explicated complicated issues such as challenges traditional culture encounters when confronted with the forces of modernization and internationalization; "In Taipei, there are 58 Starbucks stores, but there is only one Zi Teng Lu (Wistaria Tea House, a traditional tea house). Globally, there are 6,600 Starbucks stores, but there is only one Zi Teng Lu." She also elucidated the problems associated with the de-Sinicization narrative advocated by the Chen Shui-bian administration, "A political party is not synonymous with a nation; a nation is not synonymous with its culture; the CCP is not synonymous with China; and China is not synonymous with the People's Republic of China." These articles triggered heated debates rarely seen in years. In 2005, she took on the position of a full-time professor at National Tsing Hua University, Taiwan. In July of the same year, she established the Lung Ying-tai Cultural Foundation, a platform dedicated to promoting civic engagement and fostering intellectual discussions through lectures aiming to broaden the perspectives of the youth.

In January 2006, Lung wrote an open letter to Hu Jintao following the closure of Bing Dian (Freezing Point), an influential weekly magazine in China, for publishing anti-CCP content. This letter, titled, Qing Yong Wenming Lai Shuifu Wo (請用文明來說服我, A question of civility, an open letter to Hu Jintao), criticized Hu's decision to shut down the magazine and the Chinese Communist Party's suppression of the freedom of speech in China: "When I have to make a choice between Taiwan and the mainland, it really is not as hard as you think: whichever system holds those values I believe in will be my country; whichever functions against those values I will despise and reject."

In 2007, Lung was recommended as a potential candidate for a member position at the Control Yuan. She declined the offer, stating, "I want to stay as an independent pen for society." From 2008 to 2009, Lung Ying-tai served as the inaugural Hung Leung Hau Ling Distinguished Fellow in Humanities at the University of Hong Kong. In 2009, she was honored with the K.T. Li Chair Professor Award from National Cheng Kung University.

In 2008, her book Mu Song (目送, The Farewell) was published, becoming popular across Asia. The book is a collection of 74 works of prose capturing the journey through life, "from the loss of her father to the aging of her mother, the departure of her son, the concerns of her friends, and the companionship of her brothers. Her words delve into the depths of human experience, exploring themes of failure and vulnerability, loss and release, as well as the enduring bonds and profound emptiness."

Her 2009 book Da Jiang Da Hai 1949 (大江大海一九四九, Big River, Big Sea: Untold Stories of 1949), is about the Chinese Civil War and the Kuomintang's retreat to Taiwan, telling this history through the accounts of ordinary people. "In this book I don't care about who is on the right side, the victorious or the defeated side. I just want to show you that when you dismantle the apparatus of state, what's inside are these individuals." Through this book, Lung hoped her readers recognize "an entire generation of people who silently suffered enormous trauma, crushed under the iron wheel of history," paying tribute to "all those who were trampled upon, humiliated and destroyed in that historical epoch." In eighteen months it sold 400,000 copies in Taiwan and Hong Kong but was banned in mainland China.

=== Minister of Culture, 2012-2014 ===
In February 2012, Lung took on the position of Director of the Cultural Affairs Council of Taiwan, tasked with reorganizing and consolidating four separate ministries to establish the Ministry of Culture. Under her leadership, the Ministry of Culture was officially founded in May 2012. Lung was appointed the first Minister of Culture of Taiwan. Inaugurated on 21 May 2012, she stated a hope that cultural policies be served by politics rather than serve political purposes. Her policies were driven by approaches such as "rooted in the soil," "internationalization," "cloud-based," and "value-driven," that is, connecting with the grassroots to serve the general population, expanding internationally with Taiwan's soft power, embracing cloud technology to fuse culture with cutting-edge science, fostering an innovative industry ecosystem and enhancing the aesthetic economy. During her tenure, a longstanding issue regarding Public Television Service that had lingered for three years was resolved. Laws governing public broadcasting and filmmaking were revised, while new laws concerning museum management and the preservation of underwater cultural heritage were proposed. New institutions, including the National Performing Arts Center, the National Film Institute, Taiwan Traditional Theatre Center, the National Center for Photography and Images, and the Taipei Music Center were founded. She also started initiatives on reading, TV culture, international, and cross-strait cultural exchanges.

On December 1, 2014, Lung tendered her resignation from the ministerial post citing her aging mother as the main reason, with political and media hostility as contributing factors.

=== 2015-present ===
From 2015 to 2020, Lung continued her role as the Hung Leung Hau Ling Distinguished Fellow in Humanities at the University of Hong Kong.

In addition to her writing career, Lung is an eloquent speaker in both Mandarin and English, receiving frequent invitations to deliver talks worldwide, often drawing a large audience. Her 2016 book, Qingting (傾聽, 2016, Listening), is a compilation of 23 speeches edited for a reading audience.

In 2018, she published Tianchangdijiu: Gei Meijun de Xin (天長地久: 給美君的信, 2018, Eternal Love: Letters to Meijun). In the preface, Lung said she was skeptical about whether writing still held relevance after witnessing the collapse of an era and the disillusionment of values during her public service experience. This book represents her attempt to rediscover pure intentions—through personal reflections on life, death, and love for both older and younger generations. Lung moved to Chaozhou, a small town in southern Taiwan, in 2017, where she developed her first novel, Da Wu Shan Xia (大武山下, 2020, At the Foot of Mount Kavulungan). The story focuses on Da Wu Mountain (or Mt. Kavulungan in native language) in Pingtung, Taiwan. An unknown writer, who spent most of her life wandering, returns to her rural roots and encounters a mysterious 14-year-old girl, embarking on a journey where life and the land, plants, animals, and history bear witness to each other's interconnected fate. "With the boundless curiosity of a child, the tenacity of an investigative field researcher, the ethereal and graceful prose of a literary artist, and the profound and majestic language, Lung paints the world of Da Wu Mountain… She explores philosophical reflections on life and displays a deep concern for the land and its culture." "The fundamental skill of any writer is to enable readers to see things they wouldn't have seen otherwise," says Lung. She also depicts hundreds of species of plants and animals, and the book includes illustrations hand-drawn by herself. Lung became active on Facebook, often sharing her rural experiences with her readers. During the 2019-2020 Hong Kong protests, Lung wrote in a post that the participants were like "an egg lying on the ground of the garden" confronting "a wall of iron and steel." "How do we treat an egg? We bend down, gently pick it up, cradle it in our palms, and ensure it doesn't shatter." In response, People's Daily accused her of ignoring the "violent rioters" and attacked the "narrowness of her thinking." In an interview with the Nikkei Asian Review, Lung said she wished that politicians in Beijing have enough wisdom to understand the situation deeper and to see into the future with longer views and perspectives in their dealings with Hong Kong.

As cross-strait military tensions escalated, Lung posted a message on Facebook, highlighting the destructive impact of war on civilization, and concluded with "No matter what you say, I am anti-war." This statement sparked a debate in Taiwan, where people have become politically divided with polarized views about the future of the island. Some criticized her for "only speaking against war and not daring to voice opposition against the Communist Party."

Lung continues to write for international readers. In 2019, she wrote "23 Million People on a Canoe: Why Europe should care about Taiwan's future" for The Berlin Pulse. In 2023, she released a guest essay in The New York Times about the perspectives on local sentiments under cross-strait tension.

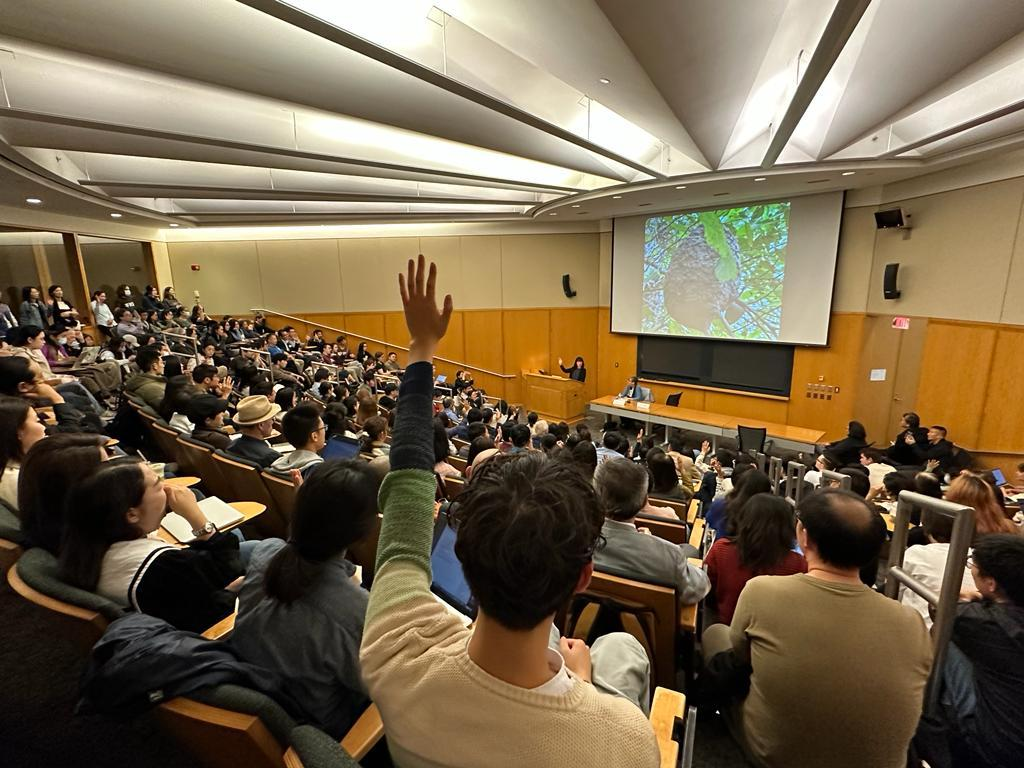
Lung delivered a talk "My Life in an Indigenous Village" at the Tsai Auditorium at Harvard University, September 27, 2023.

In September 2023, Lung was invited by Boston University's Pardee School of Global Studies, the Center for the Study of Asia, and the Harvard Yenching Institute to deliver talks on the intricate cross-strait issues and share her experience residing in Taitung, Taiwan. In October 2023, she commenced a tour of Germany and Austria commemorating the one-year anniversary of the German edition of Da Wu Shan Xia (大武山下, At the Foot of Mount Kavulungan, Am Fuße des Kavulungan). The tour began at the Frankfurt Book Fair, followed by engaging panel discussions at universities in Würzburg, Tübingen, Heidelberg, and Göttingen. Lung was also invited to the Austrian Academy of Sciences (ÖWA), where she shared insights into the cross-strait matter.

Over the course of her four-decade-long writing career, Lung has encountered numerous attacks. In her youth, Lung was considered a troublemaker by conservatives. In her middle years, Taiwan's localists criticized her, labeling her as pro-unification or alleging ties to the Chinese Communist Party. Mainland China banned most of her books, and some even accused her of advocating for Taiwan independence. These conflicting comments may serve as a testament to Lung's dedication to remaining "an independent pen for society." "She is the only person in Taiwan who dares to criticize the Nationalist Party, the Democratic Progressive Party and the Communist Party," says Huang Ching-lung, former Chief Editor of the China Times, and she is thus "destined to be solitary while offending multiple sides."

== Personal life ==
Lung has two sons from her previous (and only) marriage to a German man. One of Lung's books, Qin Ai De Andelie (親愛的安德烈, 2007, Dear Andreas), is a collection of letters and e-mails between her and her older son. As of 2023, she is tending to her mother all while engaging in full-time writing, residing in Taitung by the Pacific Ocean.

== Essays and Speeches in English ==
- Lung, Ying-tai (15 February 2006). "A question of civility: an open letter to Hu Jintao". OpenDemocracy.
- Speech (video): Lung Ying-tai -- Big River, Big Sea: Untold Stories of 1949 (English talk). (Oct. 18, 2009). The University of British Columbia.
- Speech (video): Face to Face with Dr Lung Ying-tai (Minister of Culture, Taiwan). (February 22, 2013). SOAS, University of London.
- Speech (video): "Prof. Lung Yingtai: To Believe or Not to Believe." (October 20, 2017). Loke Yew Hall, The University of Hong Kong.
- Kawase, Kenji. (4 December 2019). "Hong Kong tests Beijing's wisdom, says prominent Taiwanese writer". Nikkei Asia.
- Speech (video): "From Wild Fire to the Big Sea: In Conversation with Lung Ying-tai." (October 16, 2021). UCLA Center for Chinese Studies.
- Speech (video): "Enfant Terrible, Minister of Culture, Silent Loner? Lung Ying-tai in Conversation with Barbara Mittler." (July 25, 2022). Institute of Chinese Studies, Heidelberg University.
- Filkins, Dexter (14 November 2022). "A Dangerous Game Over Taiwan". The New Yorker.
- Lung, Ying-tai (18 April 2023). "In Taiwan, Friends Are Starting to Turn Against Each Other". The New York Times.
- Speech (video). "Lung Yingtai: “A Look Inside: Taiwanese in a Time of Cross-Strait Crisis” ." (September 18, 2023). Boston University.
- Speech (video). "Lung Yingtai: My Life in an Indigenous Village." (September 27, 2023). Harvard University.
- Speech (video). "Lung Ying-Tai: Taiwan. A Young Democracy under Geo-Political Pressures." (October 31, 2023). Österreichische Akademie der Wissenschaften (Austrian Academy of Sciences), Vienna, Austria.
- Speech (video). "In Need of a Ten-Day Walk: Autonomous War and the Human Pause." (August 11, 2026). University of Nottingham, Taiwan Research Hub, Nottingham, United Kingdom.
