= Zhuputan Temple =

Temple in Keelung, Taiwan

Coordinates: 25°07′56″N 121°44′51″E

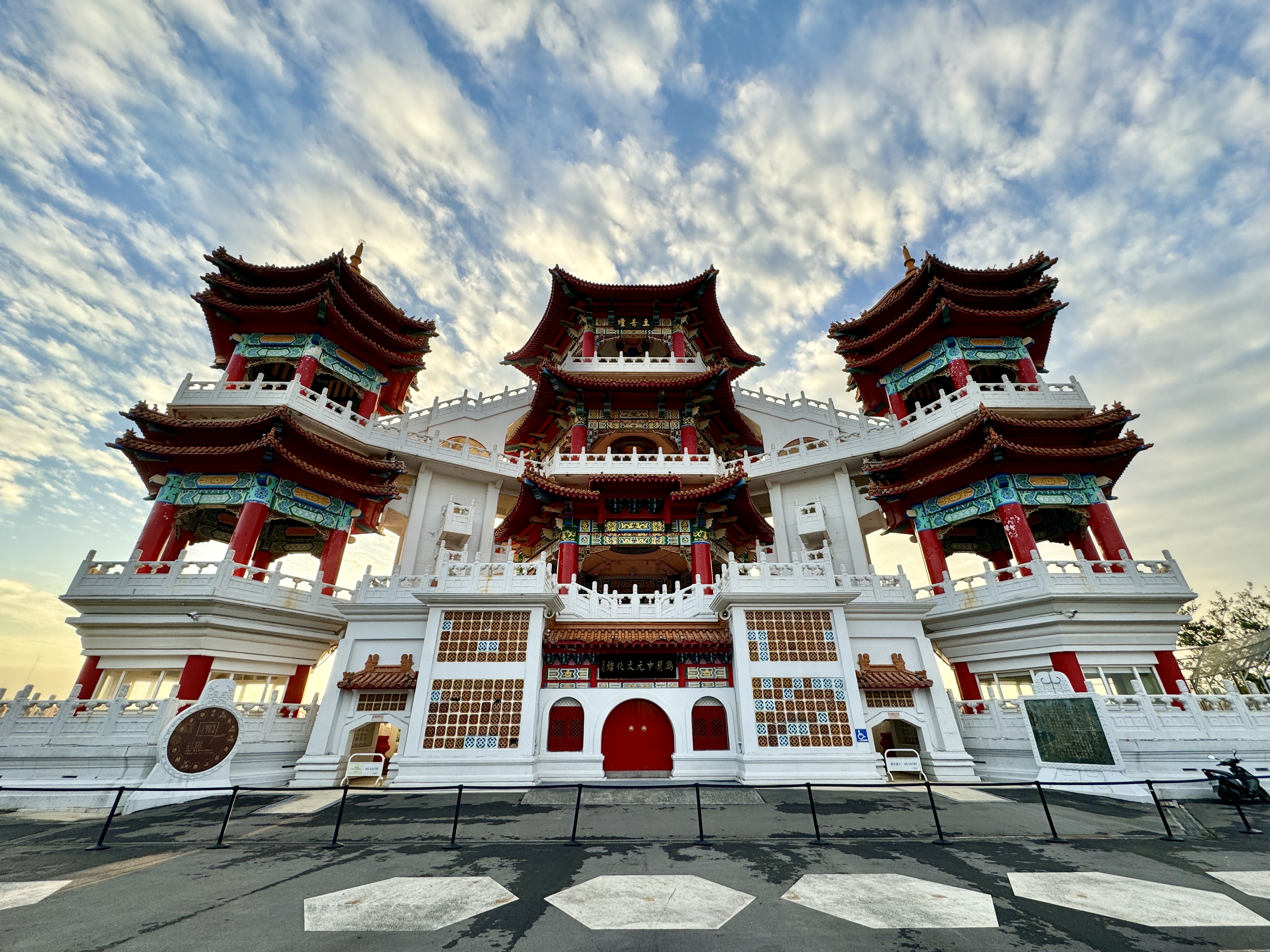
Zhuputan Temple in 2023

Zhuputan Temple (Chinese: 主普壇) is a significant cultural and religious site located in Zhongzheng District, Keelung, Taiwan. It serves as the central location for the Keelung Ghost Festival (Chinese: 鷄籠中元祭), which is one of Taiwan's most important traditional folk festivals.

== History ==
The origins of Zhuputan Temple are deeply rooted in the Qing Dynasty, when the Keelung Ghost Festival began. The festival was organised by four main groups, collectively known as the "Four Pillars," which included the main association, the main ritual site, the main altar, and Zhuputan, the central site for food offerings to the spirits. Zhuputan Temple was originally set up by rotating family clans and was held in various temporary locations without a fixed venue.

In 1928, due to the inconvenience and cost of constructing and dismantling the temporary wooden structures used for the festival each year, local gentry like Xu Zisang, Yan Guonian, and Pan Rongchun petitioned for a permanent building. The Keelung City Government approved the construction of a permanent Zhuputan Temple in Takasago Park. The building was designed by Japanese architect Ide Kaoru and featured an octagonal, two-story structure made of reinforced concrete. Construction began in 1928 and was completed on August 31, 1929.

The original Zhuputan Temple building was heavily damaged during the Keelung air raid in 1945. In 1956, the "Keelung City Zhuputan Reconstruction Committee" was formed to restore the structure. The building was renovated, adding an additional floor. However, due to its location in the city center, the festival caused significant traffic congestion, leading to a decision to relocate Zhuputan Temple to the top of Lion Head Mountain in Zhongzheng Park. The new site was completed in 1974, while the original building was demolished in 1993.

Zhuputan Temple underwent further renovations in 2001 and, in 2020, received funding from the Ministry of Culture for seismic reinforcement and structural repairs.

== Collections ==
The first floor of Zhuputan originally housed the Keelung Folk Museum, established to preserve local culture and the traditions of the Ghost Festival. In 2005, it was converted into the Zhongyuan Festival Cultural Museum with support from the Ministry of Culture. The museum was further upgraded in 2007 to include permanent exhibits related to the Ghost Festival. In 2022, the Keelung City Government allocated funds to renovate the space, rebranding it as the Keelung Zhongyuan Cultural Museum. The museum now provides visitors with a contemporary interpretation of Keelung's traditional culture, showcasing the origins of the festival, detailed rituals, offerings, and associated activities.

== Events ==
Every year on the 15th day of the 7th lunar month, Zhuputan hosts the main ritual for the Ghost Festival, starting with a purification ceremony conducted by Taoist priests. This is followed by a lantern-lighting ceremony led by local dignitaries and the festival's leaders, marking the beginning of the festival's activities.
