= Wu Mi-cha =

Taiwanese historian

- 吳密察
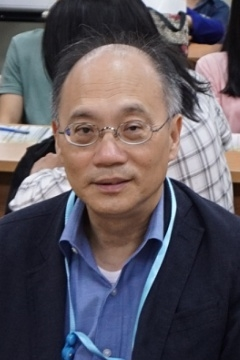
- Wu in 2017

Director of the National Palace Museum
- In office 15 February 2019 – 31 January 2023
- Preceded by: Chen Chi-nan; Lee Ching-hui (acting)
- Succeeded by: Hsiao Tsung-huang

Director of Academia Historica
- In office 20 May 2016 – 13 February 2019
- Preceded by: Lu Fang-shang
- Succeeded by: Ho Chih-lin (acting); Chen Yi-shen

Director of the National Museum of Taiwan History
- In office March 2007 – 1 August 2008
- Succeeded by: Lu Li-cheng

Vice Chairman of the Council for Cultural Affairs
- In office 5 February 2001 – 20 May 2004
- Minister: Tchen Yu-chiou
- Preceded by: Luo Wen-jia
- Succeeded by: Wu Chin-fa

Personal details
- Born: 22 March 1956 (age 70) Beimen, Tainan, Taiwan
- Party: Democratic Progressive Party (since 2002)
- Education: National Taiwan University (BA); University of Tokyo (PhD)

Chinese name
- Traditional Chinese: 吳密察
- Simplified Chinese: 吴密察
Transcriptions
Standard Mandarin
- Hanyu Pinyin: Wú Mìchá
Southern Min
- Hokkien POJ: Ngô͘ Bi̍t-chhat

Wu Mi-cha (Chinese: 吳密察; Pe̍h-ōe-jī: Ngô͘ Bi̍t-chhat; born 22 March 1956) is a Taiwanese historian. He was the vice chairman of the Council for Cultural Affairs from 2001 to 2004, after which he became director of the National Museum of Taiwan History. In May 2016, Wu was appointed head of Academia Historica, serving until February 2019, when he was named Director of the National Palace Museum. He stepped down from the NPM in January 2023.

== Education ==
Wu studied history at National Taiwan University (NTU) and later joined the faculty after completing his Ph.D. at the University of Tokyo. He specialized in the history of Taiwan.

== Career ==
By 2001, Wu joined the Executive Yuan as vice chairman of the Council of Cultural Affairs (CCA). While working at the CCA, he remained on the NTU faculty. In 2002, Wu and the CCA established a task force to investigate missing artifacts held by the National Taiwan Museum. Wu joined the Democratic Progressive Party in July of that year. In his CCA capacity, Wu acted as council spokesman and addressed several groups, among them the European Union Study Association–Taiwan and Ketagalan Academy. In September 2003, Wu announced that the CCA had drafted the National Languages Development Law, ensuring that Taiwan would not have an official language, in turn allowing local governments to choose a suitable language for communication. Wu was supportive of Taichung mayor Jason Hu's unsuccessful attempt to bring a branch of the Guggenheim Museum to the city. In April 2004, Wu visited Europe as CCA vice chair to discuss storage of historical documents.

He left the CCA in 2004, and returned to National Taiwan University. Wu subsequent endeavors included a set of bilingual comic books on Taiwan's history, published in 2005, and a documentary on Lee Teng-hui's leadership during the democratization of Taiwan, released in 2006. Wu's other publications include Liu Yung-fu in the Yiwei Battle, contributions to The Expedition to Formosa, and International View of the 228 Incident. By 2007, Wu had become the director of the National Museum of Taiwan History, which was scheduled to open the next year. Previously, in 2004, Wu had contributed records of Taiwan's opium production during the Japanese era to the museum.

In 2016, Wu was appointed director of Academia Historica and to the board of the Memorial Foundation of 228. In August 2016, Wu stated that Academia Historica would be enforcing access restrictions to documents within its archives codified by Freedom of Government Information Act. As the institute's director, Wu worked with the Tsai Ing-wen presidential administration to compile records of persecution, namely relating to the 228 incident of 1947. By June 2017, the Academia Historica under Wu's leadership had released 260,000 documents for publication online. Wu has continually advocated for the declassification and publication of documents from several periods of the history of the Republic of China during his time with the Memorial Foundation of 228 and Academia Historica. In February 2019, Wu was appointed as Director of the National Palace Museum. Wu was replaced by Hsiao Tsung-huang in January 2023.
