= Paper Windmill Theatre =

Taiwanese children's theatre group

Paper Windmill Theatre (Chinese: 紙風車劇團; pinyin: zhǐfēng chējù tuán) is a Taiwanese performance group with a primary focus on children's theater. Established in November 1992, the group's performances encompass various forms, including theater, musicals, mime, puppetry, and black light theater.

== History ==
In 1992, Lee Yung-Feng, along with Ko I-Chen, Hsu Li-Kong, Lo Pei-An, and Wu Jing-Ji, founded the Paper Windmill Theater based on the belief that "children need their own theater, and Taiwan requires its unique children's theater." The name "Paper Windmill" represents their ethos of "Let the wind blow and walk forward facing the wind." This philosophy guides their primary focus on organizing cultural events and theatrical performances that enhance children's education and provide entertainment. They have also expanded to various locations, including New York, Paris, Hong Kong, Macau, Beijing, Hungary, and more, in addition to performing regularly in theaters across Taiwan.

In 1995, the Council for Cultural Affairs, Executive Yuan, commissioned Paper Windmill for a ten-year "Youth Drama Promotion Program." They visited junior and senior high schools across the country, promoting drama through curriculum development, lectures, and helping to establish drama clubs. Starting in 1999, they organized six editions of the "Super King Lan Ling" drama competition, attracting young participants. Some students who competed in the competition found inspiration in the drama and pursued careers as performers or in arts administration.

Since 1996, Paper Windmill used the Chinese zodiac as a theme for the plays. They created works based on the zodiac animal of each year, such as "Catch the Mouse" in the Year of the Rat and "Run, Little Pig" in the Year of the Pig.

In 1998, Paper Windmill introduced the "Witch Series," featuring "Wu Ding (Chinese: 巫頂)" as a significant character in "Windmill Fantasia." Their performances included various forms like plays, musicals, and puppetry, emphasizing live interaction. They often break the fourth wall using props and storyline design. On February 20 of the same year, they registered as "The Paper Windmill Arts and Educational Foundation" with the Department of Cultural Affairs, New Taipei City Government.

In 2006, Paper windmill launched the "Arts for Children in 319 Townships Project," funded by private donations. This initiative involved providing performances for children in all 319 townships nationwide. The project spanned five years, becoming the first cultural movement recognized by UNESCO. In 2013, they once again launched the "Arts for Children in 368 Townships Project" touring program.

In 2010, Paper Windmill created "new Taiwanese fairy tales," crafting stories with native Taiwanese themes. Inspired by the illustrated book "寶莉回家" by author Hsiao Yeh, they produced the first Hakka children's musical titled "Hey! Little Boy (Chinese: 嘿！阿弟牯)."

From 2013 to 2023, Paper Windmill received continuous funding for 11 years through the Ministry of Culture's "Taiwan Brand Project," leading to their recognition as one of Taiwan's brand teams.
