= Lin Jeng-yi =

Taiwanese politician

- 林正儀
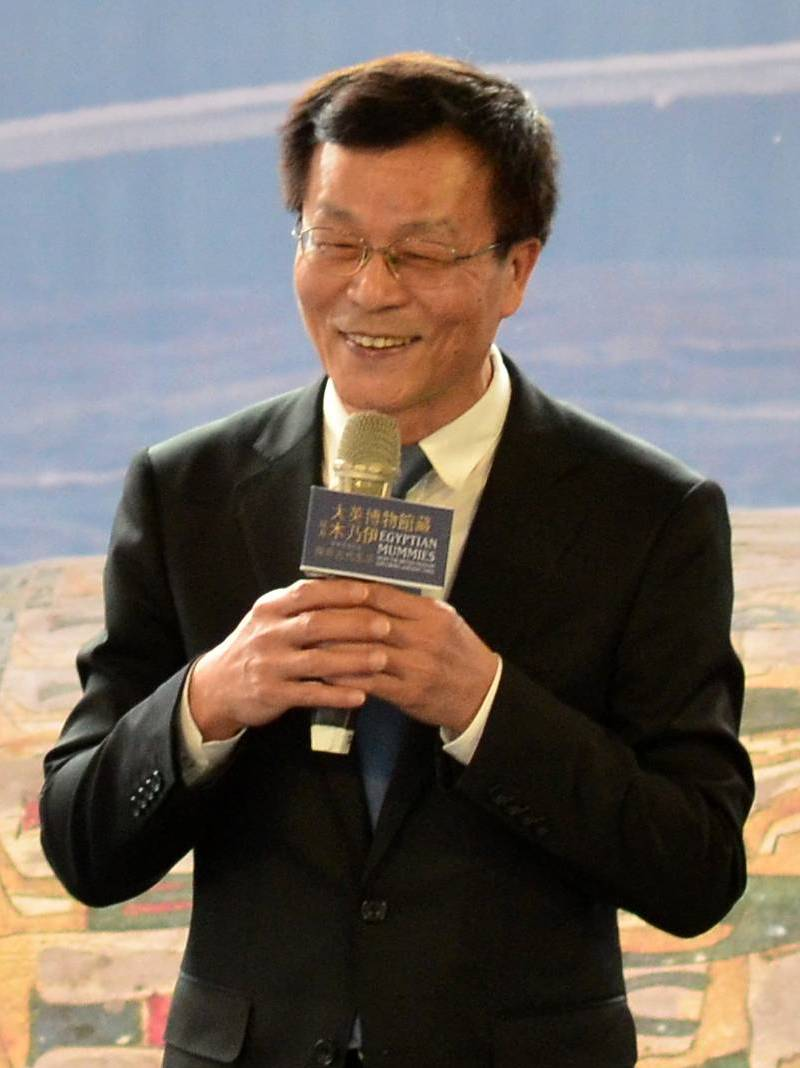

Director of National Palace Museum
- In office 20 May 2016 – 16 July 2018
- Preceded by: Feng Ming-chu
- Succeeded by: Chen Chi-nan

Personal details
- Education: Taipei National University of the Arts (MA); National Taiwan Normal University (PhD)

Lin Jeng-yi (Chinese: 林正儀; pinyin: Lín Zhèngyí) was Director of National Palace Museum of the Republic of China from 20 May 2016 to 16 July 2018.

== Education and career ==
Lin obtained a Master of Arts from School of Culture Resources, Taipei National University of the Arts in 2003 and a PhD from Department of Fine Arts, National Taiwan Normal University.

He served as Director of National Taiwan Museum of Fine Arts (2005-2006), Director of National Taiwan Craft Research Institute (2006-2010) and National Taiwan Craft Research and Development Institute (2010-2011), Director of National Taiwan Symphony Orchestra (2011-2012), and Chief Operating Officer of Chimei Museum.

From May 2016 to July 2018, he served as Director of National Palace Museum.

Government offices
Preceded by Feng Ming-chu	Director of National Palace Museum; 2016-2018	Succeeded by Chen Chi-nan
