= Cheng Shu-min =

Taiwanese politician (1946–2023)

Cheng Shu-min (Chinese: 鄭淑敏; 7 April 1946 – 26 July 2023) was a Taiwanese politician who led the Council of Cultural Affairs between 1994 and 1996.

== Life and career ==
Cheng Shu-min was born on 7 April 1946, and raised in Sanzhi, Taipei County.

Cheng was close to Lee Teng-hui, and between 1998 and 1992, served as an envoy of Lee's presidential administration to China. She and Su Chih-cheng's visits to China preceded the Wang–Koo summit in 1993. Cheng served as minister of the Council of Cultural Affairs between the terms of Sheng Hsueh-yung and Tchen Yu-chiou. Cheng was later appointed chair of China Television, and has also served on the supervisory board of Procomp Informatics.

Cheng Shu-min was married twice, first to Ko Yue-se until his death, then to Wei Duan from 1986 until their June 2006 divorce. Cheng died after a fall at her home in Washington, D.C., on 26 July 2023, at the age of 77.
