= Chen Chi-nan =

Taiwanese anthropologist

- 陳其南
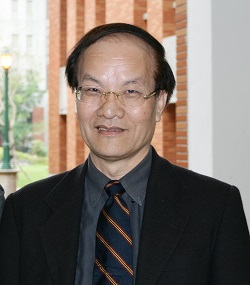

Director of National Palace Museum
- In office 16 July 2018 – 13 January 2019
- Preceded by: Lin Jeng-yi
- Succeeded by: Lee Ching-hui (acting); Wu Mi-cha

Minister of Council of Cultural Affairs of the Republic of China
- In office 20 May 2004 – 24 January 2006
- Deputy: Wu Chin-fa
- Preceded by: Tchen Yu-chiou
- Succeeded by: Chiu Kun-liang

Minister without portfolio
- In office 1 February 2002 – 19 May 2004

Personal details
- Born: 29 October 1947 (age 78) Gaoshu, Pingtung County, Taiwan
- Education: National Taiwan Normal University (BA); National Taiwan University (MA); Yale University (MA, PhD)

Chen Chi-nan (Chinese: 陳其南; pinyin: Chén Qínán; Wade–Giles: Chʻên^{2} Chʻi^{2}-nan^{2}; born 29 October 1947) is a Taiwanese anthropologist. He led the Council of Cultural Affairs from 2004 to 2006. He was named Director of National Palace Museum in 2018 and served until 2019.

== Early life and education ==
Chen was born in Pingtung County in 1947. He graduated from National Taiwan Normal University with a Bachelor of Arts (B.A.) in geography in 1970 and obtained a master's degree in anthropology from National Taiwan University in 1975. Chen then won a Fulbright Program grant to pursue graduate studies in the United States, earning a Master of Arts (M.A.) in anthropology in 1978 and his Ph.D. in anthropology in 1984, both from Yale University. His doctoral dissertation was titled, "'Fang' and 'Chia-tsu': The Chinese kinship system in rural Taiwan".

== Academic career ==
After receiving his doctorate, Chen worked as a researcher at the Academia Sinica and taught anthropology at the Chinese University of Hong Kong, and the University of Virginia. After returning to Taiwan, Chen joined the college of humanities and social sciences at National Chiao Tung University, where he later became dean.

== Political career ==
Chen was named the vice chairman of the Council for Cultural Affairs from 1994 to 1997. In January 2002, he was appointed a minister without portfolio in charge of education and culture. Chen became chairman of the Council of Cultural Affairs in May 2004. He and all members of the Executive Yuan led by Frank Hsieh resigned en masse on 24 January 2006.

In 2014, Chen helped Ko Wen-je select the head of Taipei's Department of Cultural Affairs. In July 2018, Chen was named Director of National Palace Museum, succeeding Lin Jeng-yi. Upon taking office, Chen stated that he would pursue Taiwanization of the museum. He mentioned that the museum had not worked to include other cultures present on Taiwan, namely the indigenous peoples present long before Han immigration to Taiwan, and that he would try to diversify the museum's holdings and displays. He left the job in January 2019.
