= Hung Meng-chi =

Taiwanese politician

- 洪孟啟
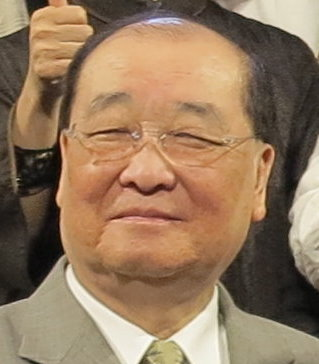

Minister of Culture (acting)
- In office 8 December 2014 – 20 May 2016
- Administrative Deputy: George Hsu
- Political Deputy: Lee Ying-ping
- Preceded by: Lung Ying-tai
- Succeeded by: Cheng Li-chun

Political Deputy Minister of Culture
- In office July 2013 – 7 December 2014
- Minister: Lung Ying-tai
- Administrative Deputy: George Hsu
- Preceded by: Chang Yun-cheng

Personal details
- Born: 20 April 1947 (age 78)
- Education: Tamkang University (BA); National Chengchi University (MA, PhD)

Hung Meng-chi (traditional Chinese: 洪孟啟; simplified Chinese: 洪孟启; pinyin: Hóng Mèngqǐ; born 20 April 1947) is a Taiwanese politician who was the Minister of Culture from 23 January 2015 until 20 May 2016, having previously served as acting minister from December 2014 to 2015.

== Education ==
Hung graduated from Tamkang University with a bachelor's degree in history. He then earned a master's degree and, in 1991, his Ph.D. in East Asian studies from National Chengchi University. His doctoral dissertation was titled, "An Assessment of the Interaction Between the CCP's Strategic Will and Strategic Capability: A Case Study of Sino-Vietnamese Relations from 1975 to 1979".

== Career ==
Hung has taught at several universities, such as Taipei National University of the Arts, Ming Chuan University, Tunghai University and Fo Guang University. He also served as a cultural official for the Taipei County Government. He attempted to resign in September 2015, after Next Magazine alleged that the Ministry of Culture had bribed members of the Kuomintang. Premier Mao Chi-kuo did not accept Hung's offer.
