= Big River, Big Sea =

Book by Lung Ying-tai

Big River, Big Sea — Untold Stories of 1949
- Author: Lung Ying-tai
- Original title: 大江大海一九四九
- Language: Traditional Chinese
- Subject: Modern history of China (Chinese Civil War)
- Publisher: CommonWealth Magazine
- Publication date: 31 August 2009
- Publication place: Taiwan
- Pages: 367
- ISBN: 978-986-241-049-3
- Preceded by: Imperial and Taiwan

Big River, Big Sea — Untold Stories of 1949 (Chinese: 大江大海一九四九) is a collection of stories written by Taiwanese author Lung Ying-tai published in August 2009. It tells in detail, the events from the surrounding the conclusion of the Chinese Civil War including Chinese families that were broken up by the civil war that ended in the Kuomintang's defeat in 1949, with some two million escaping to Taiwan. Lung Ying-tai spent more than 10 years researching material for the book and spent 400 days in Changchun, Nanjing, Shenyang, Matsu Islands, Taitung County and Pingtung County paying a visit to survivors of the Chinese Civil War in order to record their stories.

== Reviews ==
Leo Ou-fan Lee wrote in Muse that 'the problem [of the book] lies in the author's over-ambitious intent to write a testimonial saga of mammoth historical scope - all in 450 pages or 150,000 words. It should have been three times that size.'

Lung had said in the public that she especially wanted readers from mainland China to read this book. However, since the books covered various misdeeds of the Chinese Red Army during this era, it was banned by the People's Republic of China government. However, this book is still obtainable to readers in mainland China through online purchase.

In response to the book, Li Ao wrote a critical piece titled the Big River, Big Sea has fooled you (大江大海騙了你).
