= Taipei Representative Office, Dublin =

Taipei Representative Office in Ireland
- 駐愛爾蘭臺北代表處

Agency overview
- Formed: 12 July 1988
- Jurisdiction: Ireland
- Headquarters: Dublin, Ireland
- Agency executive: Daniel Diann-Wen Tang, Representative
- Website: Taipei Representative Office in Ireland

The Taipei Representative Office in Ireland represents the interests of Taiwan in Ireland in the absence of formal diplomatic relations, functioning as a de facto embassy in the absence of diplomatic relations, as Ireland adheres to the One China Policy.

The Office is responsible for promoting bilateral relations between Taiwan and Ireland at various levels such as economy and trade, academics, culture, tourism, science and technology, education, etc., as well as handling consular business such as passports, visas, and document certification, as well as providing services for expatriates and emergencies for foreigners.

== History ==
The Office was first established in Dublin in 1988 as the Free China Center in Ireland; in 1991, it was renamed the Taipei Economic and Cultural Office in Ireland, before being renamed as the Taipei Representative Office in Ireland in 1995.

== See also ==
- List of diplomatic missions of Taiwan
- List of diplomatic missions in the Republic of Ireland
- Ireland–Taiwan relations
