= Kevin Peng =

Taiwanese politician

- 彭俊亨

Deputy Minister of Culture of the Republic of China
- Minister: Lee Yung-te
- Vice: Lee Lien-chuan

Personal details
- Education: National Chengchi University (BA, MA, PhD)

Kevin Peng Chun-heng (Chinese: 彭俊亨; pinyin: Péng Jùnhēng) is a Taiwanese policy analyst.

== Education ==
Peng earned a bachelor's degree, master's degree, and, in 2011, his Ph.D. in public administration, all from National Chengchi University. His doctoral dissertation was titled, "A study on the application of collaborative innovation in the public sector: The Council for Cultural Affairs' policies on promoting the development of cultural and creative industries".

== Career ==
Peng taught at Tamkang University. He was the director of resource development at the National Culture and Arts Foundation (NCAF) from 2003 to 2015. Peng then joined the Keelung City Government under mayor Lin Yu-chang as director general of the municipal Cultural Affairs Bureau until 2017, when he returned to the NCAF as chief executive officer, where he remained until 2019. After his appointment as deputy culture minister in 2019, Peng spoke at the 2019 Comic Exhibition in Taipei, the nomination ceremony for the radio portion of the 54th Golden Bell Awards, a ceremony honoring Taipei's Museum 207, which was one of the first private museums to be certified within the purview of the Museum Act, and the Taiwan-Germany Human Rights Education Workshop. As deputy culture minister, Peng commented on Fresh Taiwan, a showcase of Taiwanese brands and products overseas, and took part in commemorations of the Kaohsiung Incident in 2019, and the 228 incident in 2020.
