= Hsiao Tsung-huang =

Taiwanese politician

- 蕭宗煌
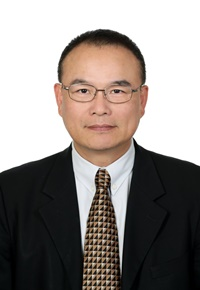
- Official portrait, 2023

11th Director of the National Palace Museum
- Incumbent
- Assumed office 31 January 2023
- Prime Minister: Chen Chien-jen; Cho Jung-tai
- Preceded by: Wu Mi-cha

Deputy Minister of Culture
- In office 7 August 2018 – 31 January 2013
- Minister: Cheng Li-chun
- Preceded by: Yang Tzu-pao
- Succeeded by: Sue Wang

Personal details
- Born: 1958 (age 67–68)
- Party: Independent
- Education: Chinese Culture University; Taipei National University of the Arts (BFA, MFA)

Hsiao Tsung-huang (Chinese: 蕭宗煌; pinyin: Xiāo Zōnghuáng) is a Taiwanese museum curator and politician who has served as the director of the National Palace Museum since 2023.

== Career ==
Huang was educated at Chinese Culture University and the Taipei National University of the Arts, where he earned a bachelor's degree in fine arts and a master's degree in arts administration, respectively. He was director of the Kaohsiung Museum of Fine Arts between 2001 and 2004, when he assumed the same role at the National Taiwan Museum. Hsiao began working for the Ministry of Culture in May 2012, and rose to chief secretary-general. He left the culture ministry in 2015 to become director of the National Taiwan Museum of Fine Arts, and also chaired the Chinese Association of Museums. Hsiao returned to the ministry of culture in August 2018, succeeding Yang Tzu-pao as deputy culture minister. In January 2023, Hsiao was named director of the National Palace Museum.
