= Taiwan Museum Association =

Organization of Taiwan

- 中華民國博物館學會
- Location: Zhongzheng, Taipei, Taiwan
- Region served: Taiwan
- Members: ~200
- Key people: Shih-Yu Hung (President)
- Website: www.cam.org.tw

The Taiwan Museum Association (TMA; Chinese: 中華民國博物館學會; pinyin: Zhōnghuá Mínguó Bówùguǎn Xuéhuì) is a professional association organized by Taiwanese museums and museum professionals.

There are 134 institutional members and over 200 individual members. The president is Shih-Yu Hung, director of National Taiwan Museum. The main services provided by TMA to its members consist of providing information, organizing professional activities, training and consultation for personnel, and publications concerning the museum profession.

On December 12, 2016, the organization was renamed from "Chinese Association of Museums (CAM)" to "Taiwan Museum Association (TMA)".

== See also ==
- List of museums in Taiwan
