= Cheng Li-chiun =

Vice Premier of Taiwan since 2024

- 鄭麗君
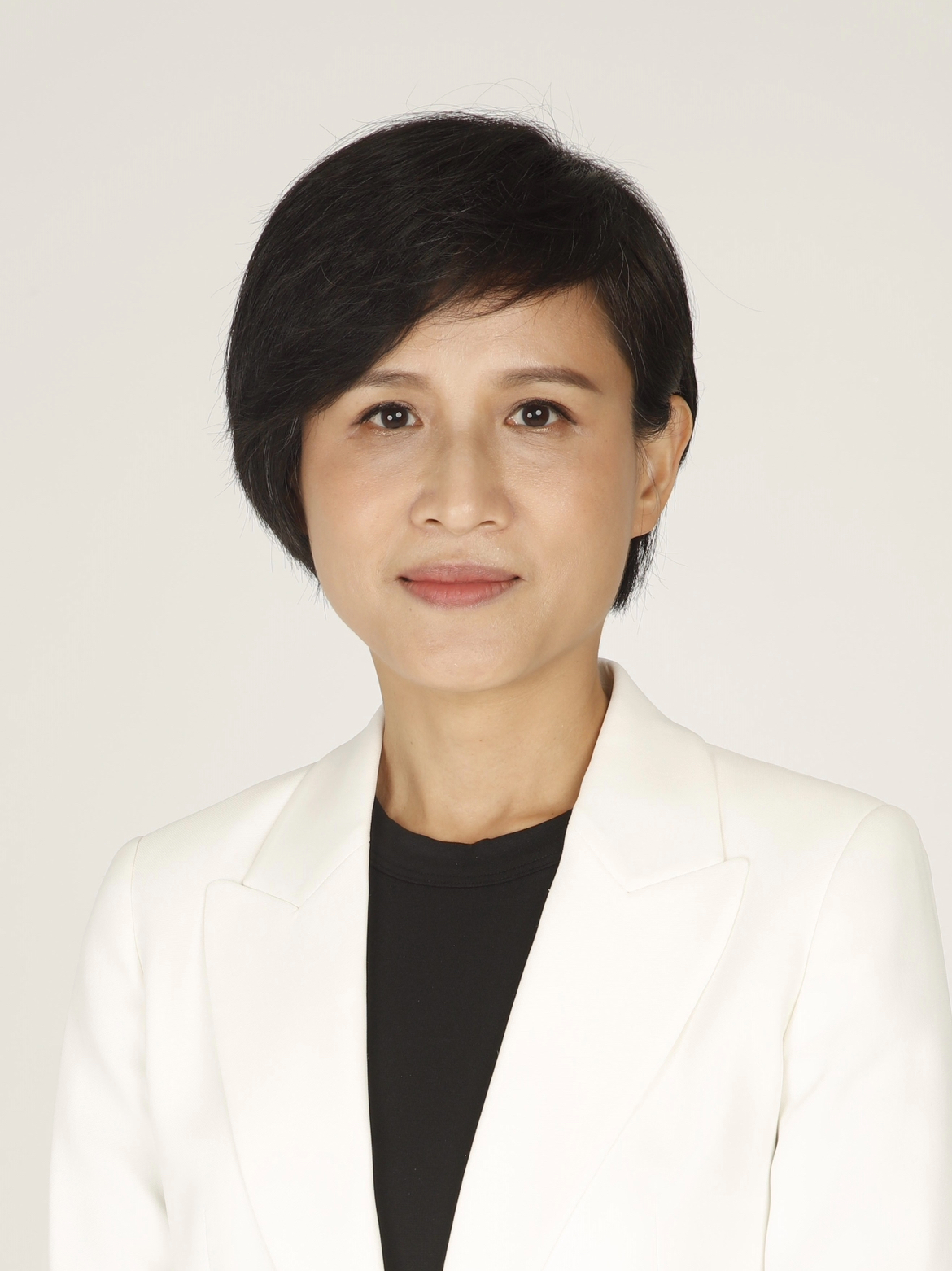
- Official portrait, 2024

40th Vice Premier of Taiwan
- Incumbent
- Assumed office 20 May 2024
- Prime Minister: Cho Jung-tai
- Preceded by: Cheng Wen-tsan
Ministerial positions
3rd Minister of Culture
In office 20 May 2016 – 20 May 2020
Prime Minister	Lin Chuan; Lai Ching-te; Su Tseng-chang
Preceded by	Hung Meng-chi
Succeeded by	Lee Yung-te
14th Minister of the National Youth Commission
In office 20 May 2004 – 21 February 2008
Prime Minister	Yu Shyi-kun; Frank Hsieh; Su Tseng-chang; Chang Chun-hsiung
Preceded by	Lin Fang-mei
Succeeded by	Chen Cong-sheng (a.i.); Lin Tai-hua

Member of the Legislative Yuan for Proportional Representation
- In office 1 February 2012 – 19 May 2016
- Succeeded by: Lee Li-feng
- Constituency: DPP Party list №9 (2012-2016); DPP Party list №11 (Feb-May 2016)

Personal details
- Born: 19 June 1969 (age 57) Taipei, Taiwan
- Party: Democratic Progressive Party
- Education: National Taiwan University (BA); Paris Nanterre University (MA, PhD); School for Advanced Studies in the Social Sciences (MSc)

Cheng Li-chiun (Chinese: 鄭麗君; pinyin: Zhèng Lìjūn; born 19 June 1969) is a Taiwanese politician who has served as the vice premier of Taiwan since 2024. Before her vice premiership, she served as the Minister of Culture from 2016 to 2020.

== Early life and education ==
Cheng was born in Taipei City on June 19, 1969, to a Hoklo Taiwanese family. Her ancestral home is in southeastern Fujian. Her father was a native of Miaoli County, and her mother, Cheng Weng Fu-mei, was a devout Buddhist. Her parents owned an ironworks.

After graduating from Taipei First Girls' High School, Cheng attended National Taiwan University, where she initially began studying civil engineering but switched to philosophy, graduating with a bachelor's degree in philosophy in 1992. As an undergraduate, she was the founding president of a glove puppetry troupe from 1988 to 1989.

After graduation, Cheng completed graduate studies in France in multiple fields. She earned a master's degree in political philosophy, economic philosophy, and social philosophy from Paris Nanterre University in 1995, and completed a second master's degree in history and civilization at the School for Advanced Studies in the Social Sciences. She then returned to Nanterre and earned her Ph.D. in philosophy, politics, economics, and sociology in 2000.

== Earlier political career ==
=== Chen government ===
She served as the Minister of the National Youth Commission from 2004 to 2008 during the second presidential term of Chen Shui-bian.

=== Legislative Yuan ===
Through 2012 Taiwanese legislative election, she was elected to the Legislative Yuan for the proportional representation in the DPP's party-list. She was re-elected in 2016, but she resigned shortly after she was designated Minister of Culture in the upcoming Tsai Ing-wen government.

During her term in the Legislative Yuan, Cheng and fellow legislators Hsiao Bi-khim and Chiu Yi-ying gained the nickname "the S.H.E of the DPP."

=== Tsai government ===
Cheng was appointed the Minister of Culture on 20 May 2016.

In April 2017, Cheng proposed a five-year infrastructure development program targeting Taiwanese historical sites to the Education and Culture Committee of the Legislative Yuan. The plan set aside NT$5.66 billion for maintenance of historic sites and NT$15.8 billion for digital infrastructure construction. She stepped down from the position on 20 May 2020, and was replaced by Lee Yung-te.

After leaving her post as culture minister, Cheng worked on a translation of The Little Prince into Chinese. She served in leadership roles for several nonprofit organizations, including the General Association of Chinese Culture.

=== Lai government ===
Earlier in the 2024 Taiwanese presidential election, Cheng was named by the media as one of the potential vice presidential candidates for Lai Ching-te. As a result, Lai picked Ambassador Hsiao Bi-khim as vice presidential candidate, and they were eventually elected into the presidency.

After Lai was elected, she became a member of the presidential transitional team. By then, she was also considered a potential prime minister (Premier of the Executive Yuan). If she were to be named premier, she'd be the first female prime minister in Taiwan's history. Cho Jung-tai was eventually chosen as prime minister with Cheng as deputy; they were one of the earliest cabinet members to be announced.

== Vice premiership (2024-present) ==
During her vice premiership, she led the delegation team to the United States Trade Representative office to discuss the United States tariff on Taiwan. This ended up in the signing of the Agreement on Reciprocal Trade.

== Personal life ==
Cheng's husband, Shen Hsueh-jung, is a technology businessman. They have a son together.

She described herself as a leftist in the DPP.
