= Ministry of Culture (Taiwan) =

Ministry of the Republic of China (Taiwan)

- 文化部; Wénhùabù (Mandarin); Bûn-hòa-pō͘ (Hokkien); Vùn-fa Phu (Hakka)
- Seal of the Ministry of Culture (文化部印)

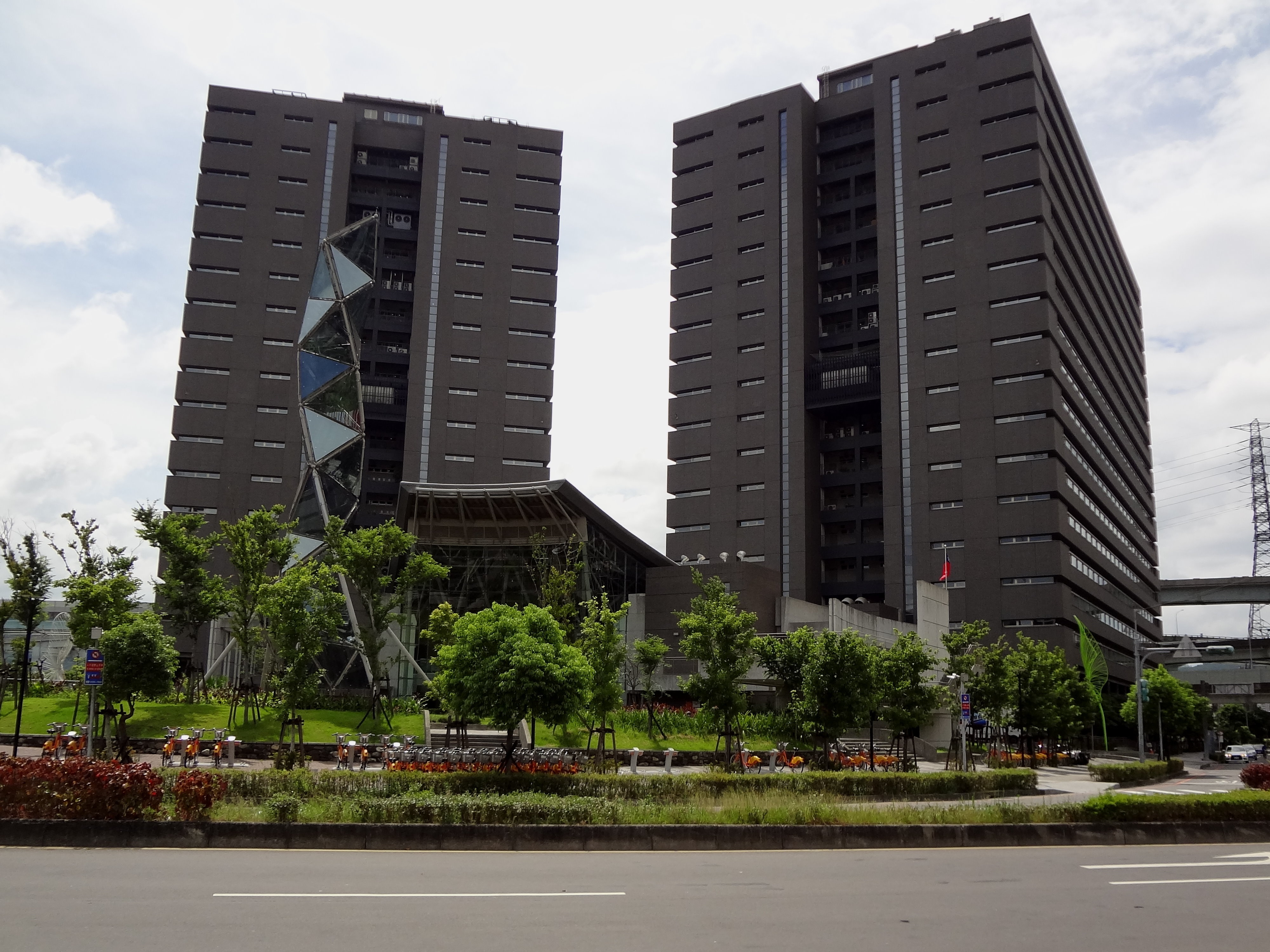

Agency overview
- Formed: 11 November 1981 (as Council for Cultural Affairs); 20 May 2012 (as MOC)
- Jurisdiction: Taiwan
- Headquarters: South Tower, Xinzhuang Joint Office Tower, New Taipei
- Ministers responsible: Li Yuan, Minister; Hsiao Tsung-huang, Peng Chun-heng, Deputy Ministers; Lee Lien-chuan, Vice Minister
- Website: Official website

Ministry of Culture
- Traditional Chinese: 文化部
- Simplified Chinese: 文化部
Transcriptions
Standard Mandarin
- Hanyu Pinyin: Wénhùabù
- Wade–Giles: Wên^{2}-hua^{4}-pu^{4}
Hakka
- Romanization: Vùn-fa phu
Southern Min
- Hokkien POJ: Bûn-hòa pō͘
Northern Min
- Jian'ou Romanized: Uǒng-hua̿ bù

Council for Cultural Affairs
- Traditional Chinese: 文化建設委員會
- Simplified Chinese: 文化建设委员会
Transcriptions
Standard Mandarin
- Hanyu Pinyin: Wénhuà Jiànshè Wěiyuánhuì
- Wade–Giles: Wên^{2}-hua^{4} Chien^{4}-shê^{4} Wei^{3}-yüan^{2}-hui^{4}
Hakka
- Romanization: Vùn-fa kien-sat Ve-yèn-fi
Southern Min
- Hokkien POJ: Bûn-hòa Kiàn-siat Úi-oân-hōe

The Ministry of Culture (MOC; Chinese: 文化部; pinyin: Wénhùabù; Pe̍h-ōe-jī: Bûn-hòa pō͘) is the ministry of the Republic of China (Taiwan) that promotes cultural and creative industries. The ministry also maintains the National Repository of Cultural Heritage.

== History ==
Established in 1981 by Executive Yuan, the ministry was initially called the Council for Cultural Affairs (CCA). The council was upgraded to ministerial level in May 2012 under the name Ministry of Culture.

The ministry was inaugurated on 21 May 2012, in a ceremony attended by President Ma Ying-jeou, Premier Sean Chen and several prominent artists, including poet Chou Meng-tieh, film director Li Hsing and singer Lo Ta-yu.

President Ma stated in a speech during the ceremony that if politics is a "fence", then culture is "the pair of wings that fly over the fence". He expressed hope that the MOC would spread "Chinese culture with Taiwanese characteristics" around Taiwan and the world.

In 2017, the MOC absorbed some duties of the Mongolian and Tibetan Affairs Commission, including the Mongolian and Tibetan Cultural Center.

== Organizational structure ==
=== Administrative units ===
- Department of General Planning
- Department of Cultural and Creative Development
- Department of Cultural Resources
- Department of Audiovisual and Music Industry
- Department of Arts Development
- Department of Humanities and Publications
- Department of Cultural Exchange

=== Staff units ===
- Secretariat
- Department of Civil Service Ethics
- Department of Personnel Affairs
- Department of Accounting
- Information Management Department
- Legal Affairs Committee

=== Bureaus ===
- Bureau of Cultural Heritage
- Bureau of Audiovisual and Music Industry Development

=== Agencies or organizations ===
The following agencies or organizations are under the supervision of the MOC:

- National Taiwan Museum
- National Museum of History
- National Museum of Prehistory
- National Museum of Taiwan History
- National Museum of Taiwan Literature
- National Human Rights Museum
- National Railway Museum
- National Taiwan Museum of Comics
- National Taiwan Museum of Fine Arts
  - National Hsinchu Living Arts Center
  - National Changhua Living Art Center
  - National Tainan Living Arts Center
  - National Taitung Living Arts Center
- National Performing Arts Center
  - National Theater and Concert Hall
  - National Taichung Theater
  - National Kaohsiung Center for the Arts
  - National Symphony Orchestra
- National Center for Traditional Arts
- National Taiwan Symphony Orchestra
- Taiwan Film and Audiovisual Institute
- National Culture and Arts Foundation
- National Taiwan Craft Research and Development Institute
- Sun Yat-sen Memorial Hall
- Chiang Kai-shek Memorial Hall
- Huashan 1914 Creative Park
- Taichung Cultural Heritage Park
- Chiayi Cultural and Creative Industries Park
- Tainan Cultural and Creative Park
- Hualien Cultural and Creative Industries Park
- Mongolian and Tibetan Cultural Center
- Zhuputan Temple

== List of overseas offices ==
The following is a list of overseas office:

Country	City	Name of office
United States	Washington D.C.	Taiwan Academy of the Taipei Economic and Cultural Representative Office in the U.S.
United States	Los Angeles	Taiwan Academy Taipei Economic and Cultural Office in Los Angeles
United States	Houston	Taiwan Academy Taipei Economic and Cultural Office in Houston
United States	New York City	Taipei Cultural Center in New York
Japan	Tokyo	Taiwan Cultural Center in Tokyo
China	Hong Kong	Kwang Hwa Information and Culture Center
Malaysia	Kuala Lumpur	Cultural Division, Taipei Economic and Cultural Office in Malaysia
Thailand	Bangkok	Cultural Division, Taipei Economic and Cultural Office in Thailand
India	New Delhi	Cultural Division, Taipei Economic and Cultural Center in India
Australia	Sydney	Cultural Division, Taipei Economic and Cultural Center in Sydney
Spain	Madrid	Cultural Division, Taipei Economic and Cultural Office in Spain
United Kingdom	London	Cultural Division, Taipei Representative Office in the U.K.
Germany	Berlin	Cultural Division, Taipei Representative Office in Germany
Italy	Rome	Cultural Division of Taipei Representative Office in Italy
France	Paris	Taiwan Cultural Center in Paris
Czech Republic	Prague	Cultural Division, Taipei Economic and Cultural Office, Prague
Russia	Moscow	Cultural Division of the Taipei-Moscow Economic and Cultural Coordination Commission

== List of ministers ==
Kuomintang Democratic Progressive Party Non-partisan/ unknown

Ministry of Education (Bureau of Cultural Affairs)

- Wang Hung-chun (王洪鈞) (1968 – 1975)

№	Name	Term of office		Days	Party	Premier
Minister of the Council for Cultural Affairs
1	Chen Chi-lu (陳奇祿)	11 November 1981	26 July 1988	2449		Sun Yun-suan; Yu Kuo-hua
2	Kuo Wei-fan (郭為藩)	27 July 1988	26 February 1993	1675	Kuomintang	Yu Kuo-hua; Lee Huan; Hau Pei-tsun; Lien Chan
3	Shen Hsueh-yung (申學庸)	27 February 1993	14 December 1994	655		Lien Chan
4	Cheng Shu-min (鄭淑敏)	15 December 1994	9 June 1996	542		Lien Chan
5	Helen Lin (林澄枝)	10 June 1996	19 May 2000	1439	Kuomintang	Lien Chan; Vincent Siew
6	Tchen Yu-chiou (陳郁秀)	20 May 2000	19 May 2004	1460		Tang Fei; Chang Chun-hsiung I Yu Shyi-kun
7	Chen Chi-nan (陳其南)	20 May 2004	24 January 2006	614		Yu Shyi-kun; Frank Hsieh
8	Chiu Kun-liang (邱坤良)	25 January 2006	20 May 2007	480		Su Tseng-chang I
9	Wong Chin-chu (翁金珠)	21 May 2007	31 January 2008	255	Democratic Progressive Party	Chang Chun-hsiung II
10	Wang Tuoh (王 拓)	1 February 2008	19 May 2008	108	Democratic Progressive Party	Chang Chun-hsiung II
11	Huang Pi-twan (黃碧端)	20 May 2008	15 November 2009	544		Liu Chao-shiuan; Wu Den-yih
12	Emile Sheng (盛治仁)	16 November 2009	27 November 2011	741		Wu Den-yih
13	Ovid Tzeng (曾志朗)	28 November 2011	5 February 2012	69		Wu Den-yih
—	Lin Chin-tien (林金田)	6 February 2012	14 February 2012	8		Sean Chen
14	Lung Ying-tai (龍應台)	15 February 2012	19 May 2012	103		Sean Chen
Minister of Culture (since 20 May 2012)
1	Lung Ying-tai (龍應台)	20 May 2012	7 December 2014	931		Sean Chen; Jiang Yi-huah
—	Hung Meng-chi (洪孟啟)	8 December 2014	23 January 2015	46		Mao Chi-kuo
2	Hung Meng-chi (洪孟啟)	23 January 2015	19 May 2016	482		Mao Chi-kuo; Chang San-cheng
3	Cheng Li-chun (鄭麗君)	20 May 2016	20 May 2020	1461	Democratic Progressive Party	Lin Chuan; William Lai; Su Tseng-chang II
4	Lee Yung-te (李永得)	20 May 2020	30 January 2023	985	Democratic Progressive Party	Su Tseng-chang II
5	Shih Che (史哲)	31 January 2023	20 May 2024	475	Democratic Progressive Party	Chen Chien-jen
6	Li Yuan (李遠)	20 May 2024	Incumbent	810		Cho Jung-tai

== See also ==
- Executive Yuan
- Culture of Taiwan
- Medal of Culture
- Creative Expo Taiwan
