= Fan Sun-lu =

Taiwanese politician

Fan San-lu MLY
- 范巽綠
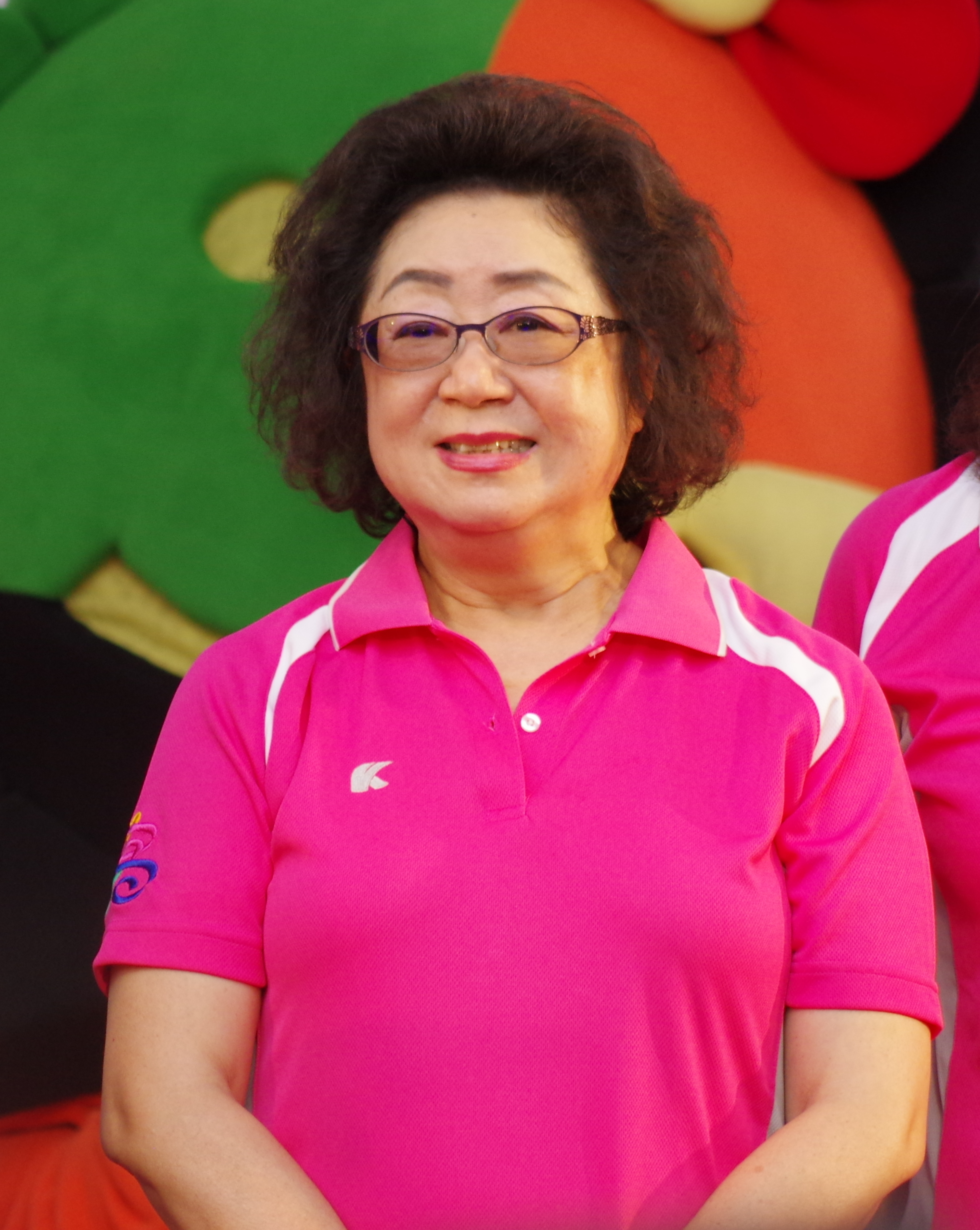
- Fan in June 2015

Political Deputy Minister of Education of the Republic of China
- In office September 2018 – May 2020
- Minister: Yeh Jiunn-rong; Yao Leeh-ter (acting); Pan Wen-chung
- In office 20 May 2000 – January 2006
- Minister: Ovid Tzeng; Huang Jong-tsun; Tu Cheng-sheng

Member of the Legislative Yuan
- In office 1 February 1996 – 20 May 2000
- Succeeded by: Wang Li-ping
- Constituency: Republic of China

Personal details
- Born: 3 October 1952 (age 74) Taipei, Taiwan
- Party: Democratic Progressive Party
- Education: Tunghai University (BA); Tamkang University (MA)

Fan Sun-lu (Chinese: 范巽綠; born 3 October 1952) is a Taiwanese politician who served on the Legislative Yuan from 1996 to 2000. She served twice as deputy education minister from 2000 to 2006 and again between 2018 and 2020. Since 2020, Fan has been a member of the Control Yuan.

== Education ==
Fan attended Taipei First Girls' High School, and studied political science at Tunghai University. Later, she earned a master's degree in American studies from Tamkang University.

== Political career ==
Fan ran the joint Taipei City Council campaign of tangwai activists Lin Cheng-chieh, Chen Shui-bian, Frank Hsieh and Kang Shui-mu in 1981. Fan was elected to the Legislative Yuan in 1995 and 1998 via party list proportional representation as a representative of the Democratic Progressive Party. As a legislator, she advocated for the preservation of historical monuments damaged by the 1999 Jiji earthquake. Fan took a particular interest in the media of Taiwan, and supported the end of media monopolies, in a market that better protected its consumers. Hsu Hsin-liang considered Fan for the position of vice president on the independent ticket he was forming for the 2000 election. She rejected the offer, and Hsu selected Josephine Chu instead. Chen Shui-bian won the election, and subsequently Fan was to join the Ministry of Education as political deputy minister under Ovid Tzeng.

Shortly after taking office, Fan announced that the ministry had begun working toward a plan to rebuild schools forced to close by the Jiji earthquake. As reconstruction efforts continued into 2001, the Chen administration attempted to rebuild an elementary school on public land administered by National Taiwan University. Fan criticized the university for barring the construction. After students at National Cheng Kung University were subject to a police raid targeting distribution of pirated media in April 2001, Fan led a task force charged with investigating the situation. In May, legislator Yang Wen-hsin accused Fan of political interference favoring Changyi Group, a construction firm that had been selected to rebuild schools damaged by the Jiji earthquake. The next year, Fan oversaw the launch of a program that sent men of conscription age overseas as teachers in private schools run by the Ministry of Education. In October, Fan visited the United States and met Secretary of Education Rod Paige to discuss a teacher exchange program between Taiwan and the United States. Though she supported initiatives to increase English-language proficiency, and had previously announced an increase in hires of foreign English-language teachers as part of the Challenge 2008 initiative, Fan stated in February 2003 that the education ministry would be reducing the number of foreign English teachers on its payroll in favor of funding the training of teachers instead. Later that month, Fan announced that the ministry was exploring ways for foreign spouses to learn Chinese, and planned to remove legal barriers to higher educational institutions for members of transnational partnerships. Her position was the subject of speculation by women's rights organizations following a May 2004 cabinet reshuffle in which Tzeng's successor Huang Jong-tsun was replaced by Tu Cheng-sheng. In August 2005, the education ministry lifted a portion of the dress code prescribed to students, a move Fan supported because schools teach students "to be responsible members of society by making decisions for themselves and thinking on their own." In December, Fan was again accused of interference, this time by Yang Chiu-hsing, regarding quality of new construction at Fong Shan Junior High School in Fongshan, Kaohsiung. Fan stepped down from the Ministry of Education in January 2006.

She was placed on the Democratic Progressive Party's party list for the 2008 legislative elections, but was not elected via proportional representation. After losing the 2008 elections, Fan became director of the Kaohsiung Bureau of Education. In September 2018, Fan returned to the Ministry of Education as political deputy minister. She resigned the position in January 2019, but elected to return to her position days later, as Pan Wen-chung, the Tsai Ing-wen administration's first education minister, returned to office. Fan remained in her post through May 2020.

In June 2020, the Tsai Ing-wen presidential administration nominated Fan to serve as a member of the Control Yuan. She was confirmed to the office the next month. While a member of the Control Yuan, Fan participated in investigations regarding sexual abuse against student athletes and the youth suicide rate.

== Personal ==
Fan is married to Chang Fu-chung.
