= Lin Teng-chiao =

Taiwanese politician

- 林騰蛟

Administrative Deputy Minister of Education
- Incumbent
- Assumed office 20 May 2016
- Minister: Pan Wen-chung; Maw-Kuen Wu; Yao Leeh-ter (acting); Yeh Jiunn-rong; Yao Leeh-ter (acting); Pan Wen-chung
- Deputy: Fan Sun-lu, Lio Mon-chi (political)

Personal details
- Education: Tamkang University (BS, MS); National Taiwan Normal University (MA, PhD)

Lin Teng-chiao (Chinese: 林騰蛟; pinyin: Lín Téngjiāo) is a Taiwanese politician who has been the Administrative Deputy Minister of Education since 20 May 2016.

== Early life and education ==
Lin graduated from Tamkang University with a bachelor's degree in computer science and information engineering. He then earned a master's degree in industrial relations from National Taiwan Normal University and a second master's degree in Chinese studies from Tamkang University. He also earned his Ph.D. in industrial education from National Taiwan Normal University.
