= Censorship in Taiwan =

Censorship in Taiwan involves the suppression of speech or public communication and raises issues of freedom of speech, which is protected by Article 11 of the Constitution of the Republic of China. Some laws restricting freedom of speech still exist, including defamation, breach of privacy, infringement of copyright, pornography, incitement to commit crimes, sale of prohibited items and distribution of offensive content.

During the period of martial law in Taiwan from 1947 to 1987, the government exercised strict media control, initially carried out by the Nationalist government which governed mainland China prior to retreating to Taiwan in 1949. Under martial law, the Kuomintang (KMT)-ruled government engaged in censorship to prevent criticism of it, as part of its opposition to certain cultural products, and as a feature of anti-communist campaigns against the Chinese Communist Party. Media control was greatly relaxed when the state moved away from authoritarianism in 1987.

While most international organisations report that Taiwan respects freedom of speech, governmental measures at combating fake news often spark controversy about the measurement constraint on freedom of expression, particularly among the KMT and their supporters.

== History ==
=== Japanese rule ===
In 1936 the Japanese authorities prohibited Lee Shih-chiao from exhibiting his painting Reclining Nude (橫臥裸婦) at the Taiyang Art Exhibition based on indecency. This instigated widespread protest from the Taiwanese art community as comparable works by western artists were held by Japanese and Taiwanese museums.

=== Martial law ===
After Taiwan was handed over the Kuomintang-led Republic of China (ROC) from Japan in 1945 and the start of the 38-year martial law period, the ROC, as an authoritarian state, exercised strict control of the media. Parties other than the Kuomintang, such as the Chinese Youth Party and China Democratic Socialist Party, were banned and media advocating either democracy or Taiwan independence was banned. Taiwanese-language media was also banned, and children who spoke Taiwanese in school were physically punished. The revision of Criminal Acts against seditious speech in 1992 ended the persecution of political opponents.

Li Ao, a famous political activist in Taiwan, nationalist, and intellectual, had over 96 books banned from sale. Writer Bo Yang was jailed for eight years for his translation of the cartoon Popeye because the translation was interpreted as a criticism of leader Chiang Kai-shek. Musician Wen Hsia became known as the "king of banned songs" due to having more than 100 songs banned by the KMT authorities.

During the martial law period, the KMT, the only paper to feature occasional moderate criticisms of the government (along with some of the best news reporting) was the Independence Evening Post. The publication was the first to send journalists to China four months after the lifting of martial law, despite government opposition.

In 7 April, 1989, pro-democracy activist Cheng Nan-jung set himself on fire in support of freedom of speech. Since the death of Cheng, Taiwan abolished the Publication Law and amended Cable Television Law in 1999.

== Current status ==
According to the United States State Department, the Taiwanese constitution provides for freedom of speech and press, and the authorities generally respect these rights in practice. An independent press, an effective judiciary, and a functioning democratic political system combine to protect freedom of speech and press. Reporters Without Borders reported that Taiwan "generally respects the principles of media freedom". Brandon Tensley identified three primary threats to press freedom in Taiwan in 2019: sensationalist journalism, Chinese propaganda, and heavy-handed government responses to the first two threats.

=== Internet access ===
According to Freedom House, technical censorship "is not routine in Taiwan". The U.S. Department of State stated in a 2012 report, "There are no official restrictions on access to the Internet or credible reports that the authorities monitor e-mail or Internet chat rooms without judicial oversight."

In 2012, the Government Information Office, the main organisation formerly tasked with censoring media, was disbanded. Since 2016, the date of Cheng's death has been commemorated as Freedom of Speech Day in Taiwan.

Taiwanese people generally do not self-censor. However, several factors influence it. According to Freedom House, defamation laws and online harassment are major factors in self-censorship. In 2023, "Cheap" (Cheng Tsai-wei), a million-subscriber YouTuber in Taiwan, said that criticising the Democratic Progressive Party might lead to his facing personal attacks from DPP supporters. He therefore felt unsafe commenting local politics. Chiu Wei-chieh agreed with Cheap.

In 2024, iWIN ordered some websites to remove illustrations sexually depicting fictional children, which triggered concerns of censorship in Taiwan. The Taiwanese government later issued a statement that only sexual images of children, pornographic drawings depicting real-life subjects, and realistic pornographic drawings generated by AI, are regulated.

In 2024, Taiwan's national government considered blocking Telegram following revelations about "Creative Private Room" (創意私房), a child pornography group on the platform. However, the government backed down after criticisms about censorship. National Tsing Hua University briefly blocked Telegram in May 2024. According to documents obtained by bloggers, the university had acted under the direction of the local government in Hsinchu City.

==== Chinese online services ====
Operating status and restrictions on Chinese online services are usually the concerns of censorship in Taiwan. In August 2020, the Ministry of Economic Affairs banned Taiwanese agents or distributors from offering mainland Chinese internet audiovisual services such as iQIYI and Tencent WeTV. Additionally, platforms like Taobao Taiwan were officially shut down. After the 2019 Double 11 shopping festival, the Taobao Taiwan app saw its download numbers exceed 2 million.

In December 2022, the Ministry of Digital Affairs declared that the mobile app Douyin and TikTok posed a threat to national cybersecurity. As a result, both the central government and local governments prohibited the downloading, installation, and use of Douyin or TikTok apps on government-issued smartphones, tablets, and computers.

In February 2025, Ministry of Digital Affairs announced it would block DeepSeek in government, citing security concerns.

In December 2025, Xiaohongshu was blocked by the Ministry of the Interior for one year citing concerns involving information security and fraud prevention; the Criminal Investigation Bureau claimed the app poses risks to users' personal data and was involved in 1,706 fraud cases since 2024.

On 5 August 2026, Taiwan’s government said it would work with other agencies to block a Chinese online platform for Taiwanese youths, saying it may have breached the Cross-Strait Act. The platform, "Taiwan Youth e-Home" , was launched on 15 July 2026 to help Taiwanese students and young people find study, work, and exchange opportunities in China.

=== Political parties ===
During the martial law period, the Civil Associations Act (人民團體法) forbade people from establishing political parties that promote separatism and communism. The law was abolished in 2011. In 2008, the Taiwan Communist Party became the 141st registered political party in Taiwan.

Under Additional Articles of the Constitution of the Republic of China (中華民國憲法增修條文), the Judicial Yuan has the right to order "unconstitutional political parties" to dissolve if it endangers "the existence of the Republic of China or the nation's free and democratic constitutional order". Currently, the Constitutional Court takes the responsibility for that. On 6 November 2024, the Ministry of the Interior filed a lawsuit seeking to ban the Chinese Unification Promotion Party for "posing a threat to democracy."

=== Local media ===
The authority for censorship in Taiwan since 2006 is the National Communications Commission (NCC). On 26 June 2006, news reports said that a review by the Council of Grand Justices of the ROC found that part of the National Communications Commission Organization Act (e.g. Article 4) is unconstitutional, and that after 31 December 2008 the law provision is invalid.

In 2016, when the Taiwanese government proposed amendments to the Copyright Act that sparked concerns about online freedom of speech and expression. The proposed changes aimed to combat online piracy but were criticised for potentially infringing on individuals’ rights to freedom of speech.

On December 12, 2020, CTi News was forced to cease broadcasting after the NCC decided not to renew its license, marking one of the rare instances of a television news station being taken off the air in Taiwan since the establishment of the NCC in 2006. CTi Television filed a lawsuit regarding this decision, and on 10 May 2023, the Taipei High Administrative Court ruled in favour of CTi Television in the first-instance verdict, annulled the NCC's decision not to renew the station's licence and remanded the case for further review. Reporters Without Borders issued a statement, saying the refusal did not go against press freedom.

In November 2024, under government pressure, Public Television Service modified a news report regarding Donald Trump's election as President of the United States. The alteration followed a TaiwanPlus journalist Louise Watt's reference to Trump as a "convicted felon". Reporters Without Borders considered this as a factually accurate description, given his May 2024 criminal conviction by a US court for falsifying business records. Reporters Without Borders called on the Taiwanese government to commit to refraining from similar interference in news coverage in the future.

=== Academia ===
On 5 January 2018, the National Taiwan University elected its 11th president, Kuan Chung-ming, who won with the highest number of votes. The Ministry of Education under the DPP refused to issue the appointment letter, citing procedural issues, which led to criticism from the academia. After two education ministers, namely Pan Wen-chung and Wu Maw-kuen, had stepped down due to this refusal, on 24 December 2018, Minister of Education Yeh Jiunn-rong stated that he grudgingly agreed to appoint Kuan Chung-ming as NTU's president, with the appointment to take effect on 8 January 2019. Yeh faced accusations of handling the matter hastily, and subsequently resigned in response.

During a lecture on 10 April 2020, Chao Ming-wei, an associate professor at Chung Yuan Christian University, referred to COVID-19 as "Wuhan pneumonia," which prompted a mainland Chinese student to file a complaint accusing him of discrimination. In response, Chao apologised during the lecture, emphasising that, "as a professor of the Republic of China," he did not engage in discriminatory behaviour. On 14 April, he was called to a meeting with the university’s dean and associate dean of academic affairs, who criticised his apology for inappropriately highlighting his identity as a "professor of the Republic of China." They warned that failure to amend his remarks could result in the case being referred to the university's ethics committee. Under these circumstances, Chao felt compelled to issue a second apology.

== Relationship with China ==
The stance and measurement over the influence from the People's Republic of China is an active area of controversy.

Reporters Without Borders and Freedom House both address disinformation from China, and self-censorship in China-related issues. According to a 2019 report by Varieties of Democracy (V-Dem), Taiwan was one of the democracies most targeted by false information from foreign governments. Brandon Tensley described Chinese propaganda influence as a "threat" to press freedom in Taiwan.

In 2017, Lee Ming-che, a Taiwanese activist, was arrested by the Chinese government and sentenced to five years imprisonment for "subverting state power". According to Freedom House, Lee's social media feeds were used as evidence of his crime. In 2019, Financial Times correspondent Kathrin Hille reported that the Chinese government intervened in the China Times, a pro-PRC media run by Taiwanese conglomerate Want Want group, that has deep business ties with China. The China Times filed a libel suit against Kathrin Hille after the report, which was described as "abusive" by Reporters Without Borders.

On the other hand, whether Chinese media should regulate or not is also controversial. For example, satellite channels perceived to adopt a pro-PRC or pro-unification editorial stance, such as Phoenix TV, were refused landing rights in Taiwan by the DPP-controlled government. Similarly, correspondent offices representing the PRC government-controlled Xinhua News Agency and the People's Daily were closed by the DPP-controlled government. These policies were reversed after the election of the Kuomintang in 2008. In 2011, however, the Mainland Affairs Council (MAC) rejected the application from the Xinhua News Agency to set up an office in Taipei 101, citing its potential political intention. By June 2024, seven Chinese media organisations had a total of ten journalists stationed in Taiwan. These included two journalists from Xinhua News Agency, three from China Central Television, and one journalist each from People's Daily, China National Radio, China News Service, Xiamen TV, and Hunan TV.

In June 2024, local media reported that a journalist from Xinhua News Agency in Taiwan has participated in the production of local television programmes. National Security Bureau Director Tsai Ming-yen confirmed that the bureau had received intelligence on the matter but emphasised that the bureau did not possess judicial investigative powers. The NCC stated it had not received any official report of the incident, after a DPP legislator claimed to have reported the issue two months earlier. Subsequently, the MAC announced the results of its investigation. Both the Chinese journalist and the Taiwanese television station involved denied the allegations and the media outlet that originally reported the claim was found to lack a valid source of information. The MAC stated that while the reporting on this issue did not breach journalistic professionalism, it declined to disclose the source of the information or the specific media outlet referenced in its findings.

In December 2024, the MAC announced plans to prohibit the Ma Ying-jeou Foundation from inviting mainland Chinese students to Taiwan. The announcement came after an interview in which a Chinese student referred to Taiwan as "China Taipei" instead of "Chinese Taipei", sparking criticism from the ruling DPP. In response, Ma Ying-jeou urged the MAC to avoid adopting what he described as a "martial law mentality" that could hinder cross-strait exchanges.

== See also ==
- Censorship in Japan
- Cinema of Taiwan
- Human rights in Taiwan
- Kaohsiung Incident
- Propaganda in the Republic of China
