= Taipei Municipal Chien Kuo High School =

Highly selective public school

Coordinates: 25°1′51.26″N 121°30′44.23″E

- 臺北市立建國高級中學
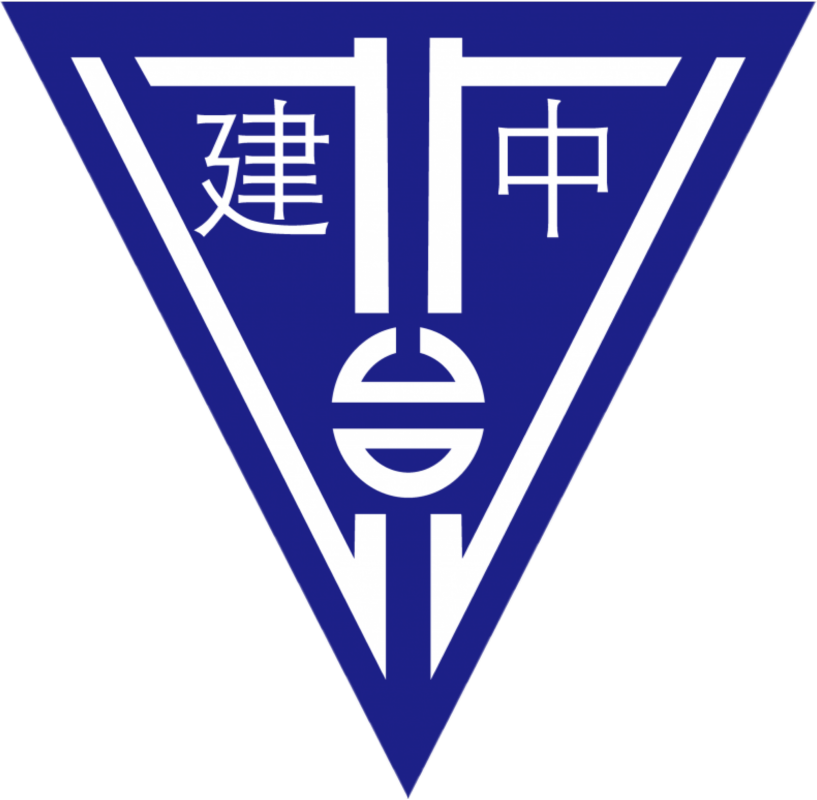

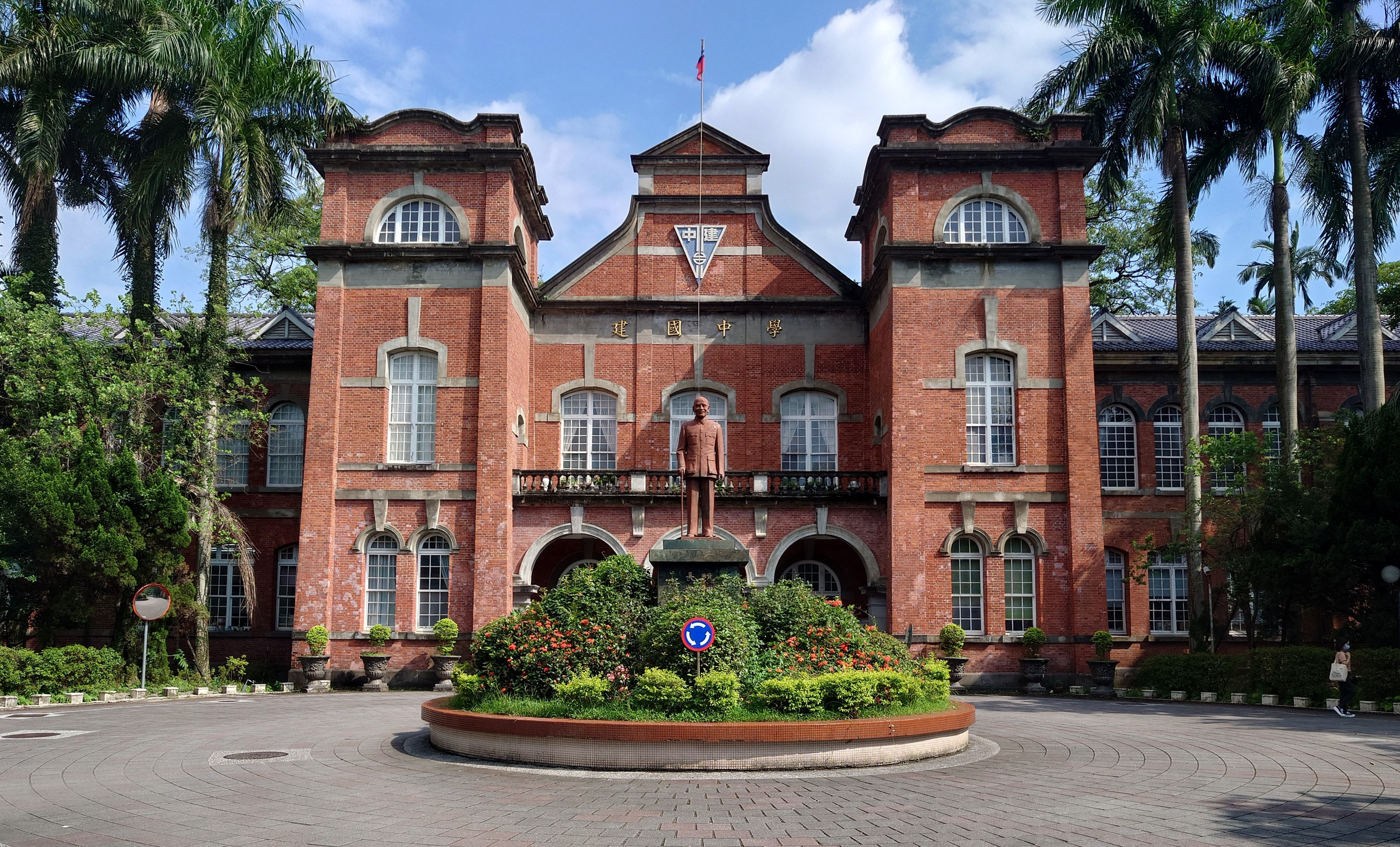
- The Red House, built around 1908, was designated a municipal historic site in 1998

Location
- No. 56, Nanhai Road; Zhongzheng District; Taipei, 100052; Taiwan

Information
- Other name: CKHS
- Former name: Taihoku Prefectural Taihoku First Middle School (1922–1945); Taiwan Provincial Chien Kuo High School (1946–1967); Taipei Municipal Jianguo High School (2003–2023)
- Type: Public selective school
- Motto: 勤、樸、誠、勇 (Diligence, Simplicity, Sincerity, Courage)
- Established: 1898; 128 years ago
- Founder: Government-General of Taiwan
- Educational authority: Department of Education, Taipei City Government
- School code: 353301
- Principal: Chuang Chih-chun
- Staff: 264 (September 2022; teaching and non-teaching)
- Grades: 10–12
- Gender: Boys
- Age range: 16–18
- Enrollment: 2,861 (September 2022)
- Classes: 82 (September 2022)
- Language: Mandarin
- Classrooms: 141 (82 general, 59 specialized)
- Area: 57,087 square metres (14.1 acres)
- Campus type: Urban
- Colour: Khaki
- Nobel laureates: Samuel C. C. Ting
- Website: www.ck.tp.edu.tw/nss/p/index

Taipei Municipal Chien Kuo High School (CKHS; Chinese: 臺北市立建國高級中學; pinyin: Táiběi Shìlì Jiànguó Gāojí Zhōngxué) is a public senior high school for boys in the Zhongzheng District of Taipei, Taiwan. Established in 1898 during Japanese rule, it is one of three boys-only senior high schools in Taiwan.

The school requires the highest scores on the national senior high school entrance exams for admittance. A feeder school to National Taiwan University (NTU), second- and third-year students recommended by the school can take courses under NTU faculty via a pilot program. Through 2008, its students had won 58 gold, 73 silver, and 22 bronze medals in mathematics and science olympiads.

== History ==
Emblem of Taihoku Prefectural First High School

=== Japanese rule ===
The school traces its origins to 1898, when a secondary course was added to the Fourth Affiliated School of the Taiwan Governor-General's Office Japanese Language School with only ten Japanese students, making it the earliest secondary school in Taiwan. The course was created to provide schooling for the children of Japanese residents in Taiwan. In 1902, the secondary course was reorganized as the Middle School Department of the Japanese Language School. In 1907, the Taiwan Governor-General's Middle School was founded in Taipei to serve the growing number of Japanese families on the island. The school began building a new campus at its present site on Nanhai Road in 1908, and moved there in March 1909. Its school building, designed by the Japanese architect Kondō Jūrō, became known as the "Red House" because of its red brick exterior. The building was constructed in a Gothic and Byzantine style.

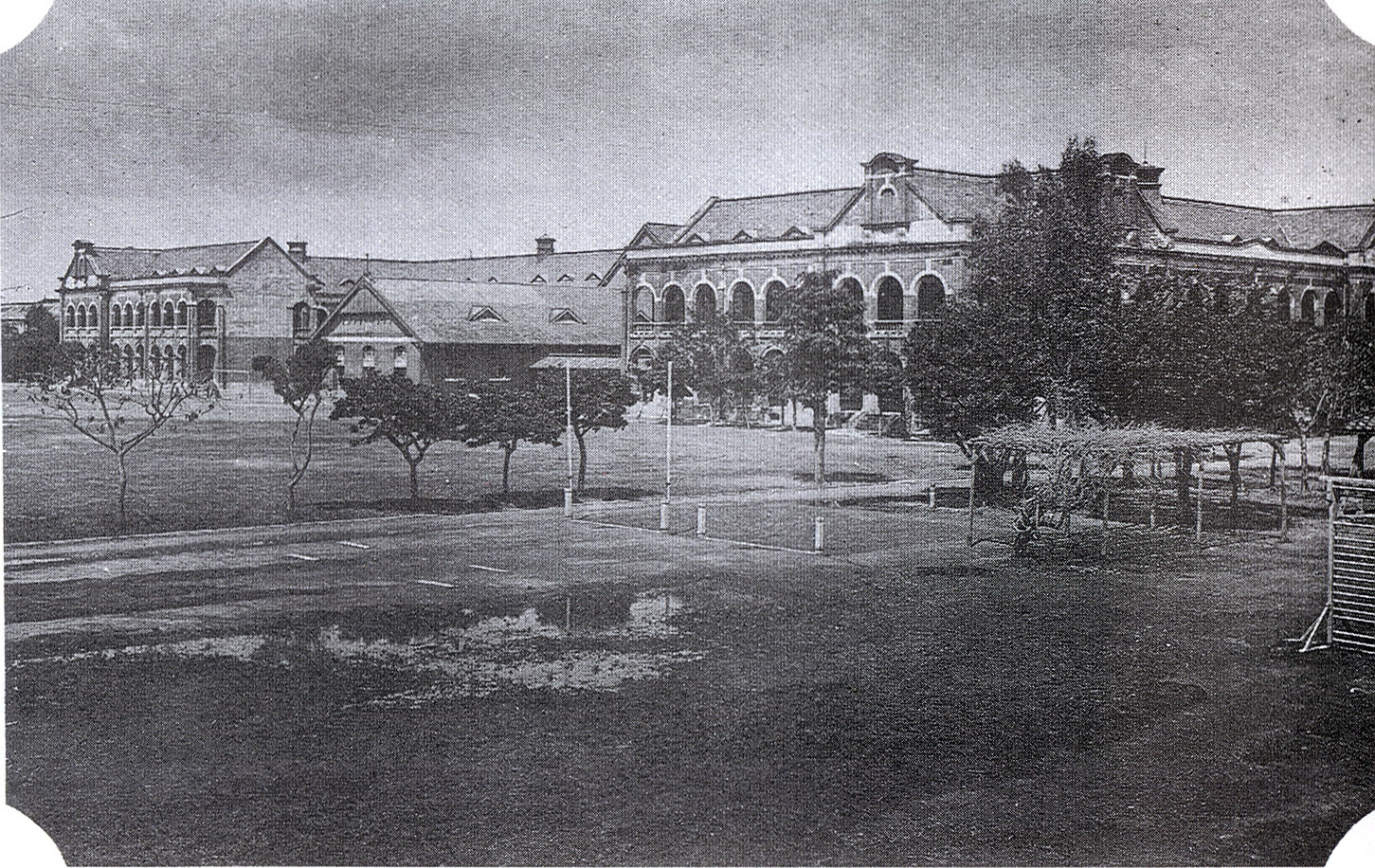
The southern side of the Red House before 1938, showing the central auditorium prior to its reconstruction

In 1922, the school was renamed Taihoku Prefectural Taihoku First Middle School, the same year that Taihoku Second Middle School (now Taipei Municipal Chenggong High School) was established. During the Japanese colonial era, a city's "first" middle school typically served Japanese students, while Taiwanese students attended the "second" school. When mixed schooling of Japanese and Taiwanese students began in 1922, only four of the school's new students were Taiwanese. According to activist Su Beng, who entered the school in 1932, more than 1,000 Japanese applicants competed for just over 200 places that year, while only nine of the more than 100 Taiwanese applicants were admitted. By the 1940s, the school had about 1,000 students, of whom Taiwanese students accounted for no more than three percent.

After 1925, in line with the Governor-General's policy, active-duty military officers were assigned to secondary schools, including the school, as drill instructors. In March 1936, the Governor-General's Office ordered secondary school uniforms changed to khaki, and new students began wearing the khaki uniform on 1 April 1936.

=== Postwar period and 228 incident ===
After the end of World War II and the Retrocession of Taiwan, Japanese students awaiting repatriation studied temporarily at Taihoku First Middle School or Taihoku Third Middle School, while most Taiwanese students in Taipei studied at Taihoku Fourth Middle School. The Taiwanese students of Taihoku First, Third, and Fourth Middle Schools were then combined into one school, whose opening ceremony on 6 December 1945 is commemorated as Chien Kuo's anniversary. In early 1946, the Ministry of Education officially named the school Taiwan Provincial Chien Kuo High School. That year, more than 200 male and female students who had come to Taiwan from the mainland enrolled, becoming the first coeducational secondary school on the island.

Students from the school took part in a demonstration on 9 January 1947 outside the Taiwan Provincial Chief Executive's Office, prompted by the rape of a Peking University student by an American soldier; it was the largest student-led public assembly of the early postwar years. During the 228 Incident, principal Chen Wen-pin secured the release of four arrested students from the Taiwan Garrison Command but was then detained himself. His case ended in May 1947 with a decision not to prosecute, and in May 1949 he left Taiwan for Beijing and never returned. Ong Iok-lim, a former prosecutor who taught English at the school, was abducted from his home in March 1947 during the incident, and he disappeared. Several students were also shot, imprisoned, or killed, including senior high student Ng Siu-gi, who was killed on 10 March 1947.

By 1949, the school had grown to 39 classes, and, in August 1949, it added a night division and an affiliated supplementary school, bringing its total to 61 classes. In 1954, the school was ordered to admit more than 200 overseas Chinese students returning to study in Taiwan. A branch campus opened in Nanshijiao in 1955 and became independent in 1963 as what is now Zhonghe Junior High School.

=== Contemporary history ===
In 1967, after Taipei became a municipality under the Executive Yuan, the school was renamed Taipei Municipal Chien Kuo Senior High School. By 1969, the school had 77 day classes, 30 night classes, and 28 continuing-education classes, with more than 7,500 students, making it the largest public senior high school in Taiwan. The Red House was designated a municipal historic monument in 1998, and a two-year restoration of the building was completed in 2005.

In 2003, in accordance with government policy, the school's English name was changed from Chien Kuo to the pinyin spelling Jianguo. On 14 March 2023, after an application was approved, the school reverted its English name back to Chien Kuo.

== Campus ==
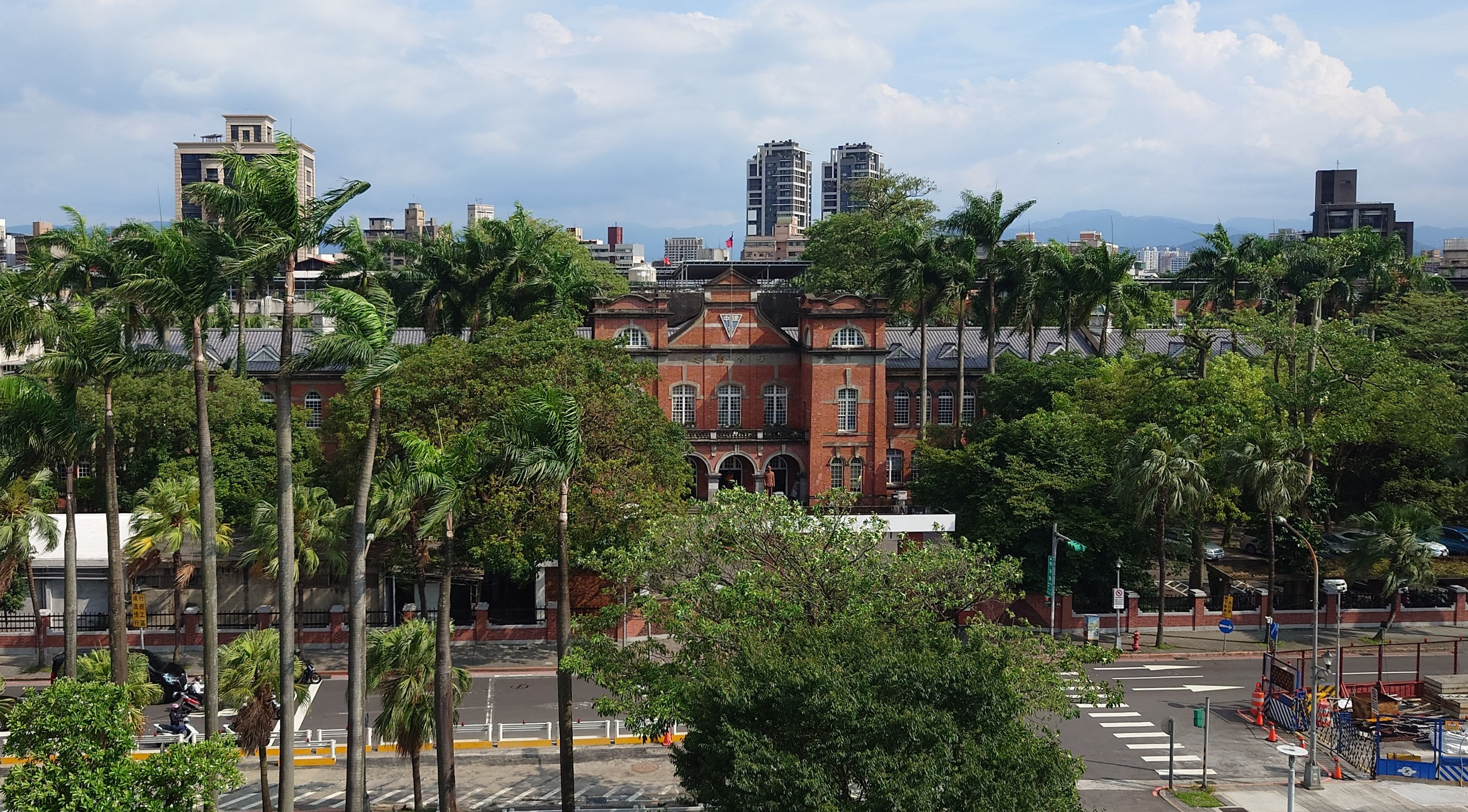
View of the school's Red House in June 2023

The high school is located at 56 Nanhai Road in Zhongzheng District, Taipei, adjacent to the Taipei Botanical Garden and Nanhai Academy. The campus covers approximately 57,087 square metres (14.1 acres). The school is situated near the National Central Library, National Museum of History, National Taiwan Arts Education Center, National 228 Memorial Museum, and National Education Radio.

The school has 11 main campus buildings: the historic Red House (紅樓), Mingdao Building (明道樓), Zhizhi Building (致知樓), Gewu Building (格物樓), Science Building (科學館), Zhengyi Building (正誼樓), Zhuangjing Building (莊敬樓), Ziqiang Building (自強樓), Student Activity Center (活動中心), Educational Resources Building (資源大樓), and Dream Red House (夢紅樓).

The historic Red House stands near the school's main entrance on Nanhai Road, with the Zhizhi, Zhuangjing, and Zhengyi buildings situated farther north within the campus. The central portion of the campus is occupied by the main athletic field and running track, while the Science Building, Educational Resources Building, and Dream Red House are located toward the western side of the grounds.

== Admissions and student body ==
=== Admissions ===
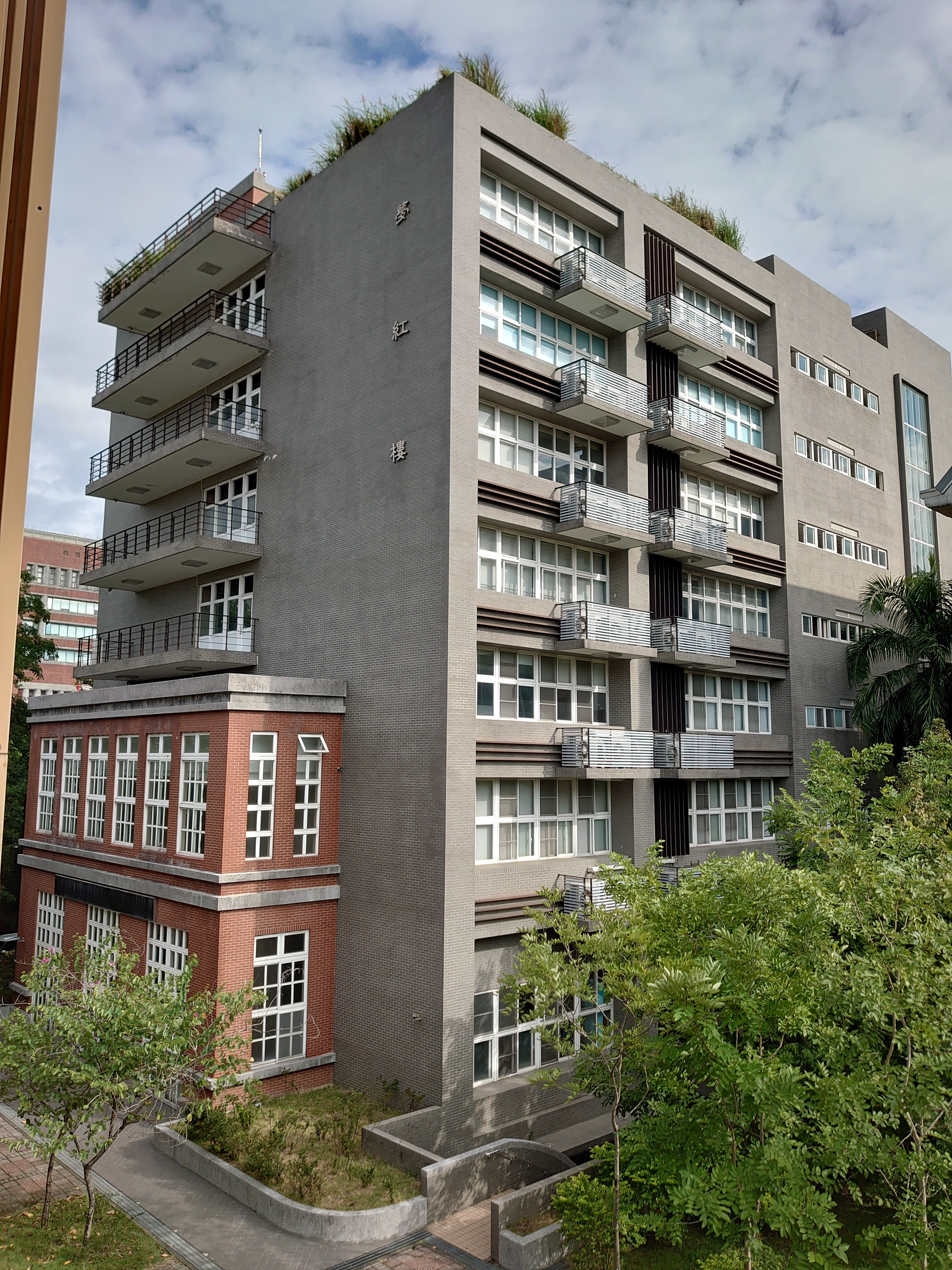
The school's New Red House

Admission to Chien Kuo High School is highly competitive. In the Keelung–Taipei school district's open admissions program, applicants are ranked on a 108-point scale in which results from the Comprehensive Assessment Program for Junior High School Students, diverse learning performance, and the order of an applicant's school preferences are each worth 36 points. Admission to Chien Kuo would require 34.6 of the 36 exam points, compared with 33.6 for Taipei First Girls' High School. In 2026, Chien Kuo admitted 891 students through the open admissions program. Taipei has for years declined to publish minimum admission scores, but the minimum score for Chien Kuo that year was reported to be about 33.8 points, subject to tie-breaking. For the 2024 school year, as Taipei reduced the size of public high school classes to 34 students, Chien Kuo cut its intake by 23 places.

Beginning in 2009, Chien Kuo and eight other high schools successively established "science" classes of admitted students. Science classes are a special admissions route for which applicants may apply from outside their home school district. Applicants must be recommended by their junior high schools, each of which may recommend no more than 20 percent of its graduating class. For the 2026 school year, Chien Kuo's science class offered 30 places, restricted to boys. The school also operates mathematics and science gifted classes alongside its science class.

In 2016, the Ministry of Education required Chien Kuo's science class to admit both boys and girls from the 2017 school year, as Chien Kuo was the only one of the nine high schools with science classes that had never admitted girls. In January 2017, however, the school submitted its science class admissions prospectus without any places for girls.

The school stopped admitting students to its humanities and social sciences gifted class from the 2023 school year, and the class's final cohort presented their research in June 2024.

=== Student body ===
As of September 2022, the school had 2,861 students in 82 classes. Chien Kuo is one of only three boys-only senior high schools in Taiwan, all in the Keelung–Taipei district, alongside Taipei Municipal Chenggong High School and the private Xuhui High School in New Taipei. In 2002, Chien Kuo and Taipei Municipal Zhongshan Girls High School held a four-day exchange in which 300 students from each school attended classes at the other, the first such exchange between the schools.

== Academics ==
=== Curriculum ===
Chien Kuo provides a three-year senior high school education. Its curriculum is organized into three course groups (班群), alongside separate programs for students in mathematics and science gifted education, the science class, and athletics. The first course group offers advanced study in the humanities and social sciences, including history, geography, civics, and literature. The second group includes advanced courses in mathematics, physics, chemistry, engineering design, and technology, while the third includes advanced biology alongside physics and chemistry. The curriculum also provides for advanced English composition, English listening and speaking, literary studies, and independent learning.

=== Gifted education and science programs ===
Chien Kuo operates a mathematics and science gifted education program (數理資優班) that focuses on scientific research and independent research. First-year students begin studying research methods and then pursue projects in six fields: mathematics, physics, chemistry, biology, earth science, and computer science. The projects are supervised by school teachers or university professors, with the school providing designated research periods during the first and second years. Students present their findings at an annual mathematics and science gifted class research exhibition.

In 2009, Chien Kuo was among six Taiwanese senior high schools selected by the Ministry of Education to establish specialized science classes in cooperation with universities, with National Taiwan University as Chien Kuo's partner institution. The science class curriculum is divided into two stages, beginning with foundational science and humanities coursework during the first two years and progressing to specialized scientific study. Students who satisfy the program's academic requirements may undertake advanced science courses taught by university professors or enroll in relevant university courses. During the advanced stage, students conduct scientific research under the supervision of university faculty.

== Notable alumni ==
Notable alumni

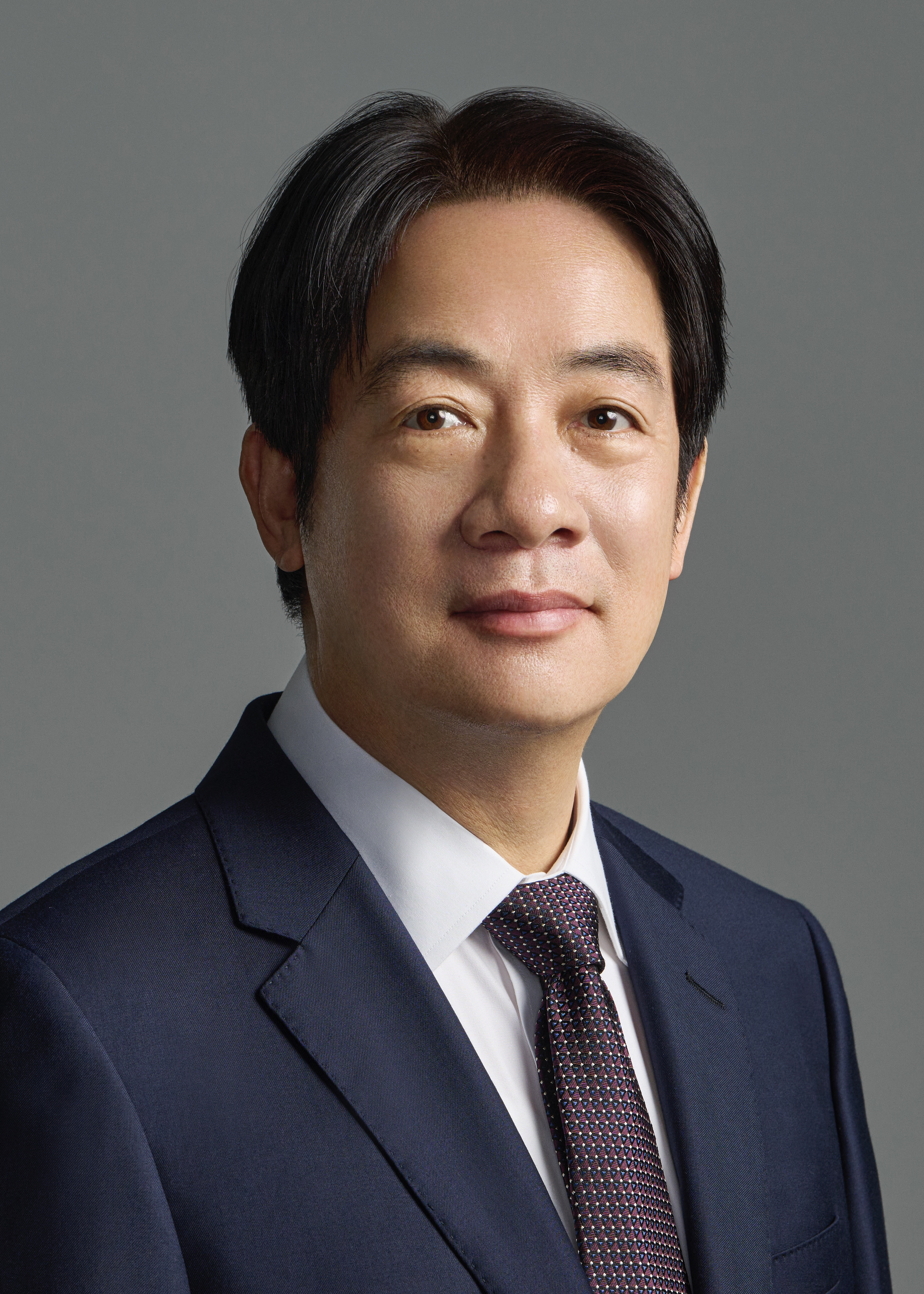
Lai Ching-te

Samuel C. C. Ting

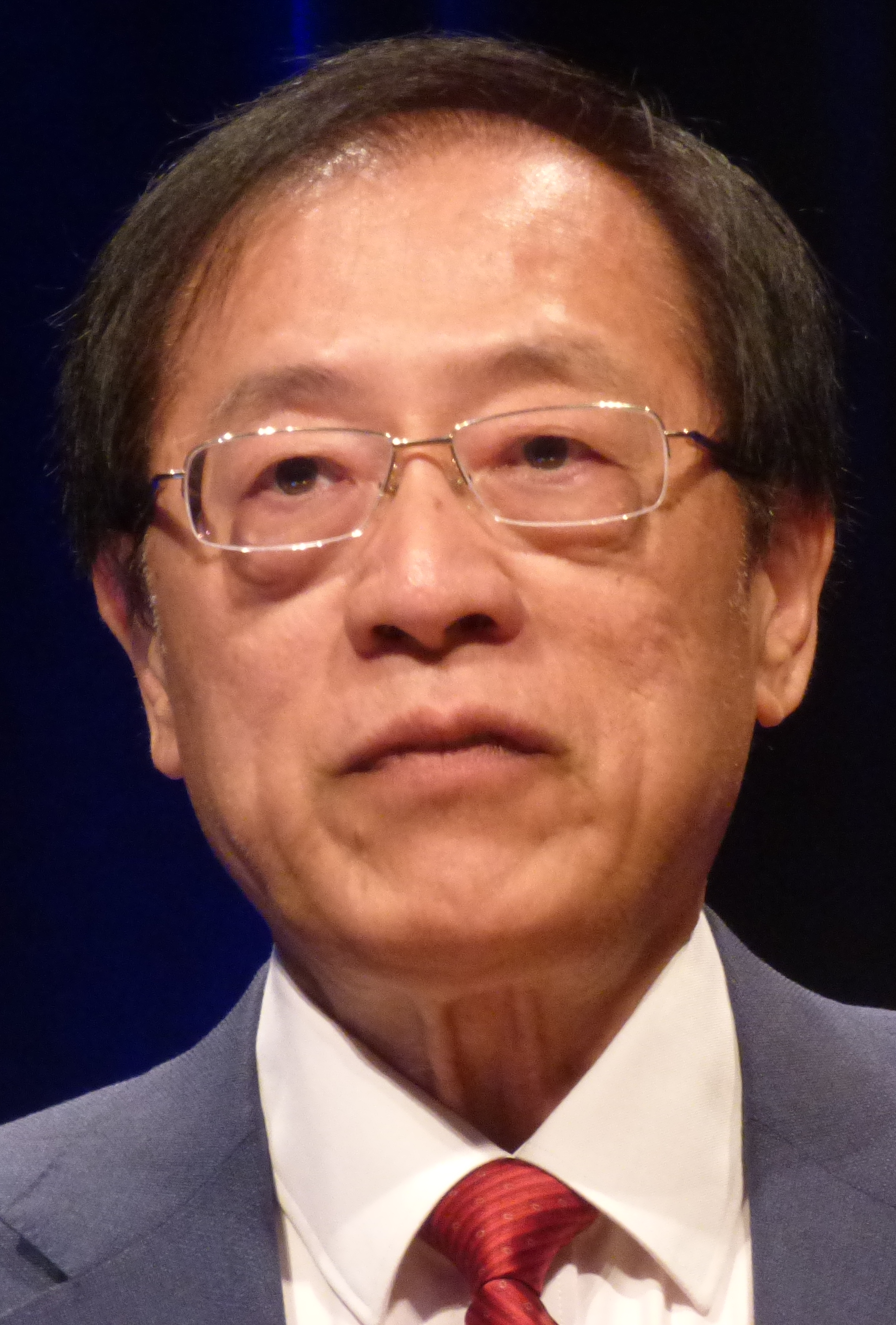
Andrew Yao

The school has more than 120,000 alumni in Taiwan and abroad. Its Japanese alumni association held its final reunion in 2007 and was then dissolved. In 2025, 202 students from Chien Kuo were admitted to National Taiwan University, more than any other high school. Through 2008, students had won 58 gold, 73 silver, and 22 bronze medals in mathematics and science olympiads. At the 2025 International Biology Olympiad, Taiwan's team won one gold and three silver medals, with the gold won by Chien Kuo second-year student Chen Chun-ying and one of the silvers by fellow Chien Kuo student Kuo Che-yu. At the 2026 International Mathematical Olympiad, Chien Kuo student Hsu Ting-cheng won a gold medal and ranked 30th, the best individual result on Taiwan's team.

In science, physicist Samuel C. C. Ting graduated from Chien Kuo in 1955 and shared the 1976 Nobel Prize in Physics with Burton Richter for the discovery of the J/ψ particle. In the arts, the novelist Pai Hsien-yung graduated from the school in 1956 and then enrolled to study hydraulic engineering at National Cheng Kung University. The film director Edward Yang, who with Hou Hsiao-hsien is regarded as a leading pioneer of Taiwan New Cinema, was also a Chien Kuo graduate.

In politics and public life, Su Beng entered Taihoku First Middle School in 1932, at the age of 15. Activist Cheng Nan-jung came from Yilan to study at Chien Kuo after finishing junior high school. Taiwanese president Lai Ching-te was the only student from the Wanli area admitted to Chien Kuo in his year. In 2025, after Lai had become president, a former Chien Kuo classmate presented him with a school jacket embroidered with his name at an education awards ceremony. Eric Chu, a former chairman of the Kuomintang, entered Chien Kuo in 1976. In December 2025, Chu and fellow alumnus Simon Chang, the mayor of Taoyuan, returned to the school to speak with students ahead of its 127th anniversary. Chiang Wan-an, the mayor of Taipei and also an alumnus, attended the school's 126th anniversary celebration in 2024 wearing the Chien Kuo uniform.
