= China Education Ministry =

China Education Ministry may refer to:

- Ministry of Education (China), that regulates all aspects of the educational system in the People's Republic of China
- Ministry of Education (Taiwan), that is responsible for incorporating educational policies and managing public schools throughout the Republic of China
