= Daisy L. Hung =

Taiwanese cognitive psychologist and lawyer

- 洪蘭
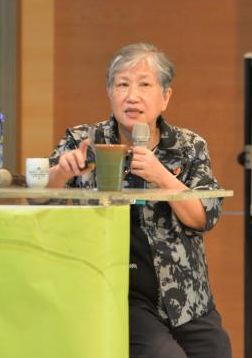
- Born: March 29, 1947 (age 79)
- Education: National Taiwan University (LLB); University of California, Riverside (MA, PhD)
- Spouse: Ovid Tzeng
- Scientific career
- Fields: Cognitive psychology
- Workplaces: University of California, Irvine; University of California, Riverside; Salk Institute; National Central University; National Chung Cheng University
- Thesis: A chronometric study of sentence processing in deaf children (1980)
- Doctoral advisor: David H. Warren

Hung Lan (simplified Chinese: 洪兰; traditional Chinese: 洪蘭; pinyin: Hóng Lán; Born March 29, 1947), also known by her English name Daisy Hung, is a Taiwanese cognitive psychologist and lawyer. She is the founding director of the Institute of Neuroscience at the National Central University in Taiwan. Her research areas are involved with cognitive psychology, psycholinguistics, neuropsychology and neurolinguistics. In addition to conducting research, Hung also translates scientific works, educates children on reading habits and lectures on her research topics.

== Early life and education ==
Hung was born on May 29, 1947. She studied law from 1965 to 1969 at National Taiwan University, where she graduated with a Bachelor of Laws (LL.B.) before pursuing a master's degree in experimental psychology with a minor in statistics at the University of California, Riverside, from 1978 to 1979. She continued her studies there and earned her Ph.D. in cognitive psychology with a minor in neurolinguistics in 1980. Her doctoral dissertation, completed under psychologist David H. Warren, was titled, "A chronometric study of sentence processing in deaf children".

== Career and research ==
After receiving her doctorate, Hung remained in the United States for another eleven years before returning to Taiwan. From 1980 to 1981, Hung was a postdoctoral research associate at The Haskins Laboratory (New Haven, CT). Following this role, Hung continued her research as a Postdoctoral Fellow with the National Science Foundation at University of California, Irvine, Medical School from 1981 to 1982.

After her fellowship with the National Science Foundation, Hung was a postdoctoral research associate at University of California, Riverside, from 1982 to 1984 and at Salk Institute for Biological Studies from 1985 to 1986. Hung spent 1984 to 1985 as a visiting associate professor at National Taiwan University. Continuing her work at the Salk Institute for Biological Studies, Hung was named a Wang Institute Fellow from 1986 to 1987 before also serving as a visiting research assistant from 1987 to 1989. Hung ended her time in the United States as a research associate professor at University of California, Riverside, from 1989 to 1991.

Hung returned to Taiwan in 1991 and served as a psychology professor at National Chung Cheng University from 1991 to 1997 and at the Institute of Neuroscience College at National Yang Ming University from 1997 to 2008. In 2008, Hung was the Founding Director of Laboratories for Cognitive Neuroscience at National Yang-Ming University in Taiwan. Since 2008, Hung has continued to serve as the director as well as become the research lead of the Emotion and Criminology Lab at the Institute of Cognitive Neuroscience, located in the College of Science at the National Central University in Taiwan. In 2015, Hung was also named the Siu Lien Wong Visiting Fellow of the Chung Chi College and the Chinese University of Hong Kong, which is awarded to one outstanding academic scholar. As the Siu Lien Wong Visiting Fellow, Hung provided public lectures at the college and spoke at the College's Annual Education Conference. Recently, on October 15, 2019, Hung and her spouse, Tzeng worked with the Haskins Laboratory, where Hung worked as a postdoctoral research associate in the early years of her career, to officially found a joint developmental neuroscience lab at the National Taiwan Normal University studying the relationship between language and the brain along with clinical studies of language and reading disorders.

== Academic impact ==
While she has translated over 50 books on biotech & psychology to popularize scientific knowledge, Hung has also visited about 1000 primary & secondary schools to promote reading habits. In addition to promoting greater access to scientific knowledge aside from her work in translation and education, Hung has also spoken at numerous talks and lectures discussing her work.

== Personal life ==
Hung is married to Ovid Tzeng, a linguistics professor at the Linguistics Institute at Academia Sinica.
