= Tsai Ching-hwa =

Taiwanese academic

- 蔡清華

Political Deputy Minister of Education of the Republic of China
- Incumbent
- Assumed office 20 May 2016
- Minister: Pan Wen-chung

Personal details
- Education: National Kaohsiung Teachers' College (BA, MA); National Chengchi University (PhD)

Tsai Ching-hwa (Chinese: 蔡清華; pinyin: Cài Qīnghuá) is a Taiwanese academic who has been the Political Deputy Minister of Education of Taiwan since 20 May 2016.

== Education ==
Tsai earned his bachelor and master's degree in education from National Kaohsiung Teachers' College in 1980 and 1983, respectively, and obtained his Ph.D. in the same field from National Chengchi University in 1993.

== Ministry of Education ==
=== 2017 South Korea visit ===
On 1–8 April 2017, Tsai visited South Korea to promote educational cooperation between the two sides and to further understand the primary education system in the country. During the visit, he met with Representative to South Korea Joseph Shih in which both discussed various topics from education, tourism, economics and politics.

=== Non-Chinese Malaysian students in Taiwan ===
In July 2017, Tsai made a statement that any non-Chinese students from Malaysia would not face any difficulty to study in Taiwan as most of the courses taught at public and private higher education institutions are taught in English. He also pointed out that the ministry had instructed those institutions to cater the needs for Muslim students, especially on the availability of prayer rooms and Halal-certified foods.
