= Chen Chu-Shui =

Taiwanese Composer, Violinist

Chen Chu-Shui (1942–1986) was a Taiwanese composer and violinist born in Dashu district, Kaohsiung. He was the recipient of the 5th Kaohsiung Culture & Arts Award in the music category in 1986. Chen served as the head of the music department at the Private Tainan Junior College of Home Economics (later renamed as Tainan University of Technology), a board of Directors of the Kaohsiung Music Association, and a member of the Asian Composers League Taiwan National Committee. He and his wife, pianist Liu Fu-Mei, were known for their efforts to promote music education and art activities in southern Taiwan.

== Life ==
Chen Chu-Shui was born in 1942 in Dashu district, Kaohsiung. He enrolled in the music department of National Taiwan Academy of Arts in 1961, majoring in violin under the tutelage of Professor Ma Xi-Cheng, and studying composition under Professor Hsu Tsang-Houei. In 1964, he published his debut work “Autumn.” Upon his graduation from National Taiwan Academy of Arts in 1966, he performed in National Taiwan Arts Education Center in the next year and settled in Kaohsiung with his wife, pianist Liu Fu-Mei, a fellow student from the same school.

== Career ==
In 1971, Chen Chu-Shui was appointed to the music department of the then Private Tainan Junior College of Home Economics, which was the first music department in southern Taiwan and is now renamed as the Department of Music, Tainan University of Technology. He published his work Lyric Piano Pieces in 1972. Two years later, he participated in the 1st concert of the International Society for Contemporary Music and formed an art group called the “Hanyue (Cold Moon) Club” with other Kaohsiung-based artists, including composer Tyzen Hsiao, for interdisciplinary art exhibitions and performances over the next two years.

In the following years, he performed and published new pieces at the Asian Composers League Taiwan National Committee. In 1981, he republished “Lyric Piano Pieces” and published “Taiwan Ballad Piano Suite I & II,” along with violin works “Remembrance,” “Winter Song,” and “Sonata for Violin and Piano.” In 1982, he released “Collection of Lyrical Songs” and string quartet “On the Way Home, Op. 6” and held six solo tours around Taiwan. In 1983, he published a book entitled How to Become a Violin Teacher. In 1984, his composition “Collection of Lyrical Songs, Op. 1, No. 2” was selected as the designated piece for the piano competition in Taiwan.

== Death and legacy ==
In February 1986, Chen Chu-Shui was diagnosed with terminal cancer. In May of the same year, he was named the recipient of the 5th Kaohsiung Culture & Arts Award in the music category and died in August. In 2020, the memorial concert and exhibition “Chen Chu-Shui Composition Concert” was held at the National Kaohsiung Center for the Arts (Weiwuying).
