= Wang Liping =

Wang Liping may refer to:

- Wang Liping (Taoist) (born 1949), Chinese Taoist
- Wang Liping (footballer) (born 1973), Chinese footballer
- Wang Liping (racewalker) (born 1976), Chinese race walker
- Wang Liping (politician), former chairman of Shanghai CPPCC
- Wang Li-ping (born 1962), Taiwanese activist and politician
