= Lin Mun-lee =

Taiwanese scholar and writer

- 林曼麗
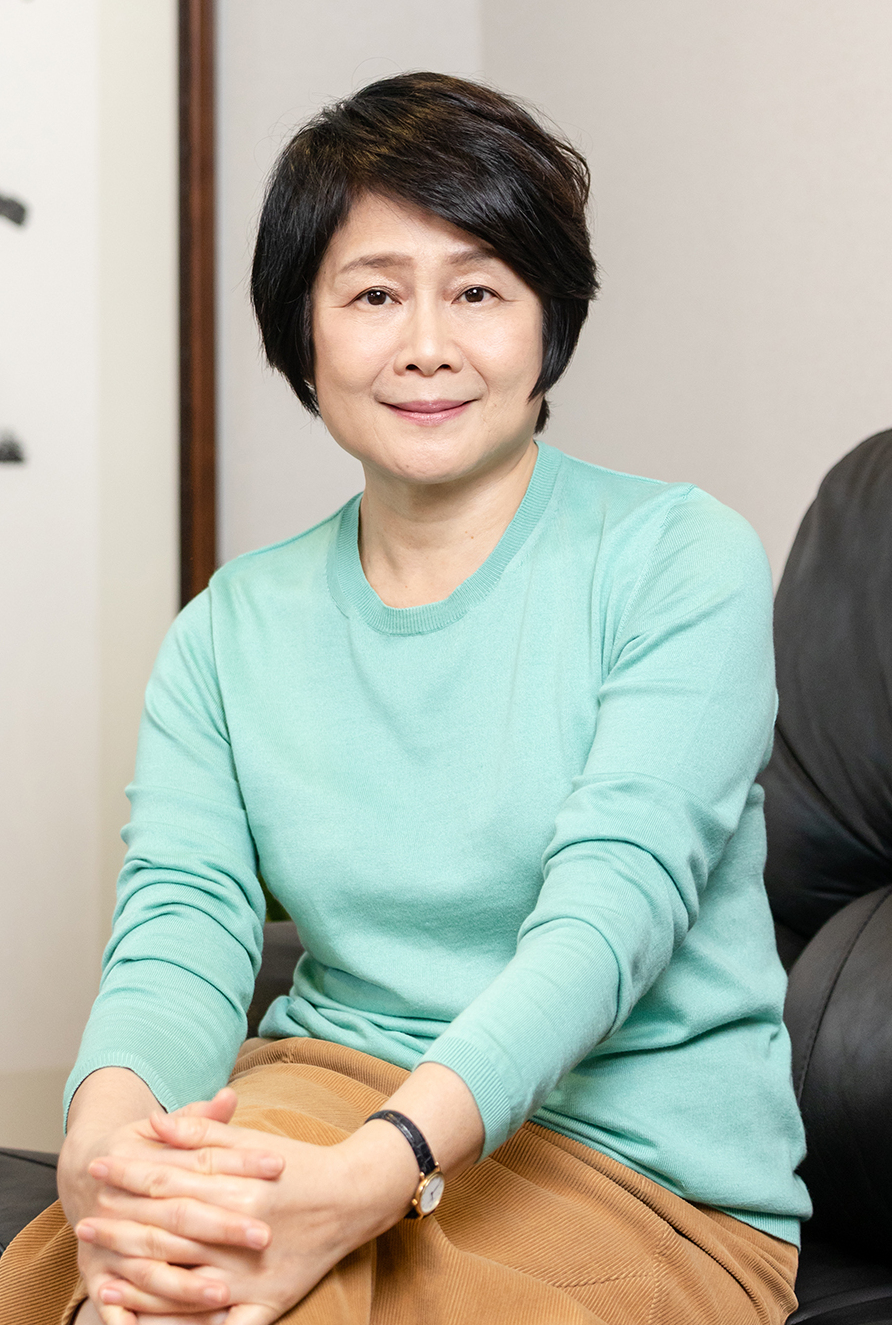
- Lin Mun-lee in April 2020

Director of National Palace Museum
- In office January 2006 – May 2008
- Preceded by: Shih Shou-chien
- Succeeded by: Chou Kung-shin

Personal details
- Born: 8 August 1954 (age 71) Taiwan
- Education: National Taiwan Normal University (BA); University of Tokyo (MA, PhD)
- Occupation: Scholar; writer

Chinese name
- Traditional Chinese: 林曼麗
- Simplified Chinese: 林曼丽
Transcriptions
Standard Mandarin
- Hanyu Pinyin: Lín Mànlì

Lin Mun-lee (Chinese: 林曼麗; born 8 August 1954) is a Taiwanese scholar and writer. She served as Deputy Director of National Palace Museum from 2004 to 2006, and its Director between 2006 and 2008.

== Life and career ==
Lin Mun-lee was born on 8 August 1954 in Taiwan, where she completed her bachelor's degree in art from National Taiwan Normal University in 1976. She received her master's degree and doctoral degree in education from the University of Tokyo in 1983 and 1988, respectively.

Lin returned to Taiwan in April 1989 and that year became an associate professor of the Department of Education at National Taiwan Normal University. In November 1996 Lin Mun-lee was recruited by Taipei Mayor Chen Shui-bian as president of Taipei Fine Arts Museum, she held that office until July 2000. She became deputy secretary-general of Chinese Cultural Renaissance Association in September 2000, and served until February 2003. In February 2003 she was chairman of the board of National Culture & Arts Foundation, a position in which she remained until September 2004.

In May 2004 she became the deputy director of National Palace Museum, rising to director in January 2006. After stepping down from the National Palace Museum, Lin returned to the National Taipei University of Education faculty. In 2012, she established the Museum of National Taipei University of Education. The museum's first exhibit featured Taiwanese artist educated in Japan, including Lee Shih-chiao, Liao Chi-chun, Huang Tu-shui, and Chen Cheng-po. In 2021, Lin located a lost work of Huang's, Sweet Dew, which had been completed in 1919, featured in the 1921 Japanese imperial art exhibition, and subsequently gone missing for fifty years.

Government offices
| Preceded by Shih Shou-chien | Director of National Palace Museum; 2006–2008 | Succeeded by Chou Kung-shin |
