= Shih Shou-chien =

Taiwanese art historian, archaeologist, and academic

- 石守謙
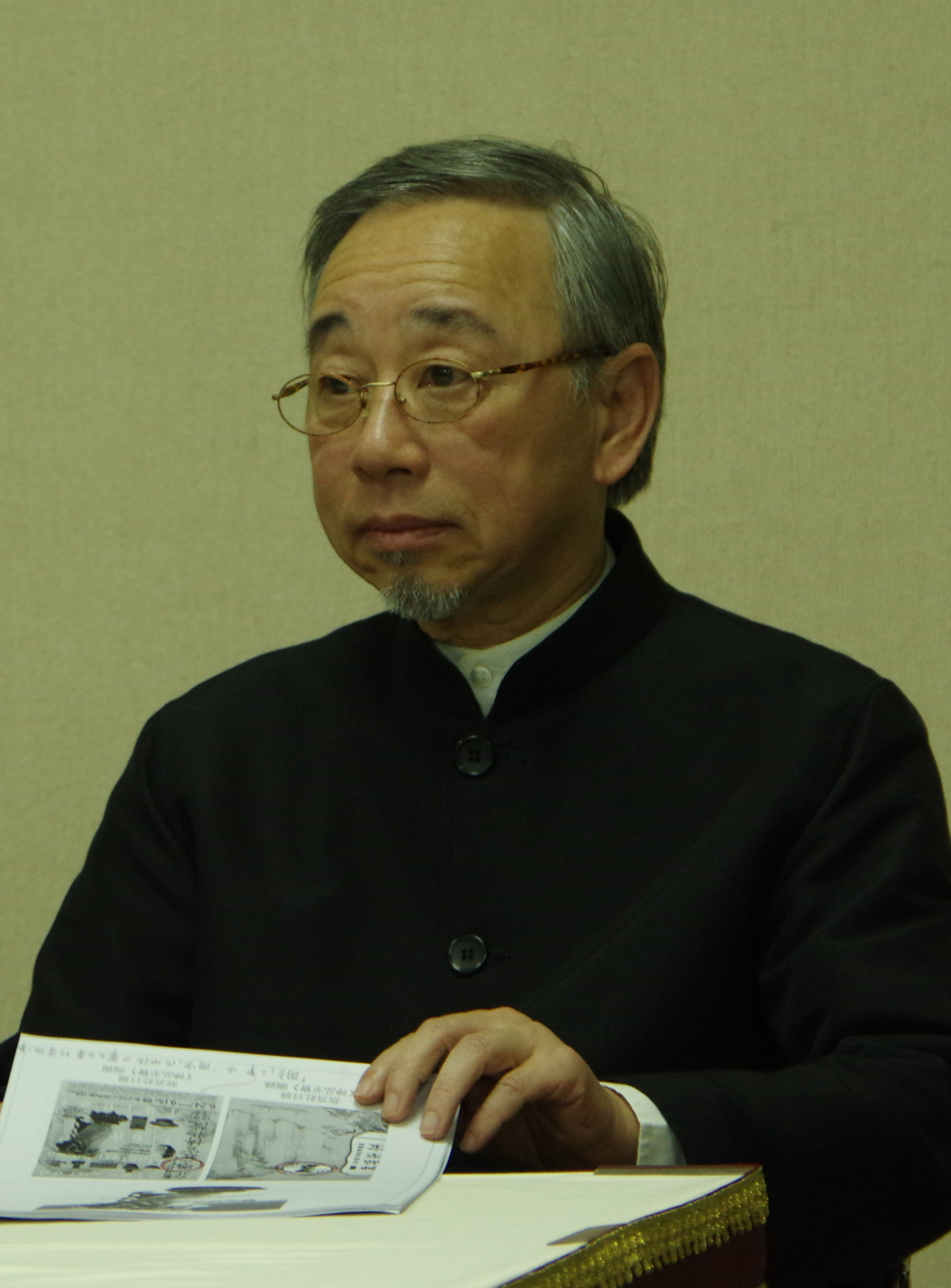
- Shih in 2015

Director of the National Palace Museum
- In office 20 May 2004 – 25 January 2006
- Preceded by: Tu Cheng-sheng
- Succeeded by: Lin Mun-lee

Personal details
- Born: 8 June 1951 (age 74) Taiwan
- Education: National Taiwan University (BA, MA); Princeton University (PhD)

Chinese name
- Traditional Chinese: 石守謙
- Simplified Chinese: 石守谦
Transcriptions
Standard Mandarin
- Hanyu Pinyin: Shí Shǒuqiān

Shih Shou-chien (Chinese: 石守謙; born 8 June 1951) is a Taiwanese art historian, archaeologist, and academic who served as the director of the National Palace Museum from 2004 to 2006. He is a professor at National Taiwan University and a member of Academia Sinica.

== Early life and education ==
Shih was born in Taiwan on June 8, 1951. He graduated from National Taiwan University with a Bachelor of Arts (B.A.) in history in 1973 and obtained a Master of Arts (M.A.) in the subject from the university in 1977. He then completed graduate studies in the United States at Princeton University, where he won a fellowship from the Andrew W. Mellon Foundation to study at the Metropolitan Museum of Art in New York City from 1981 to 1983.

In 1984, Shih earned his Ph.D. in art and archaeology from Princeton under art historian Wen Fong and sinologist Frederick W. Mote. His doctoral dissertation was titled, "Eremitism in landscape paintings by Ch'ien Hsüan."

== Career ==
Shih was a professor at National Taiwan University in 1990, becoming director of the Institute of Art History in 1991. In May 2000 Executive Yuan appointed him as Deputy Director of the National Palace Museum. After this office was terminated in May 2004, he was promoted to Director position, serving until January 2006. He is a researcher at Academia Sinica since 2006, and he was elected an academician in July 2012.

== Works ==
=== Journals ===
- Shih, Shou-Chien 石守謙. 2003. “Die Kaiserliche Chinesische Sammlung und das Nationale Palastmuseum,” in Schätze der Himmelssöhne: Die Kaiserliche Sammlung aus dem Nationalen Palastmuseum Taipeh, Toyka-Fuong Ursula (ed). Bonn: Kunst- und Ausstellungshalle der Bundesrepublik Deutschland, pp. 12–19.

Government offices
Preceded by Tu Cheng-sheng	Director of National Palace Museum; 2004–2006	Succeeded by Lin Mun-lee
