= Wu Ching-ji =

Taiwanese educator

- 吳淸基
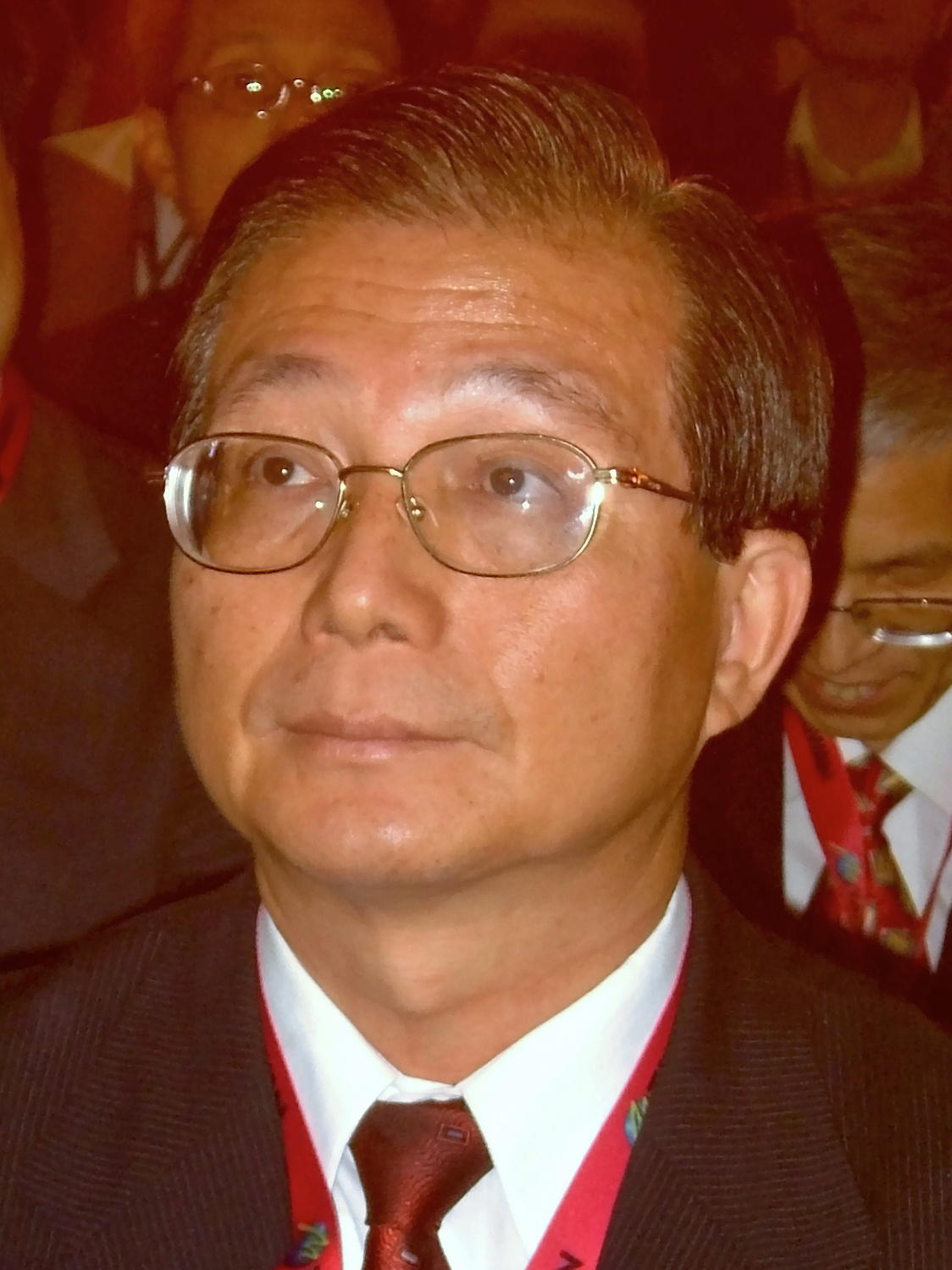

24th Minister of Education of the Republic of China
- In office 10 September 2009 – 6 February 2012
- Preceded by: Cheng Jei-cheng
- Succeeded by: Chiang Wei-ling

Deputy Mayor of Taipei
- In office 25 December 2006 – 10 September 2009
- Preceded by: King Pu-tsung
- Succeeded by: Lee Yong-ping

Personal details
- Born: 15 June 1951 (age 74) Jiali, Tainan, Taiwan
- Party: Kuomintang
- Education: National Taiwan Normal University (BEd, MEd, PhD)

Wu Ching-ji (Chinese: 吳淸基; pinyin: Wú Qīngjī; born 15 June 1951) is a Taiwanese educator. He was the Minister of the Education from 2009 to 2012.

== Education ==
Wu was educated at National Taiwan Normal University, where he received his bachelor's degree in education in 1973, his master's degree in education in 1979, and then his Ph.D. in education in 1985. After beginning a doctoral program from 1981 to 1982 at the University of Missouri in the United States, Wu went to England and was a postdoctoral researcher at the University of London in 1987. In 1997, he was a visiting scholar at Harvard University.

== Political career ==
Wu was the Administrative Vice Minister of Education in the Executive Yuan in 1999-2000 and the Political Vice Minister in 2000. In 2000–2001, he was the director of the preparatory office of the National Academy for Educational Research. He became the Deputy Mayor of Taipei City Government in 2008, and was back again at the Ministry of Education as Minister from 2009 to 2012.
