= Cheng Jei-cheng =

Taiwanese politician

- 鄭瑞城
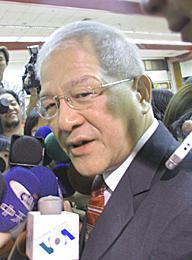

23rd Minister of Education of the Republic of China
- In office 20 May 2008 – 10 September 2009

Personal details
- Born: November 6, 1946 (age 79) Su'ao, Yilan County, Taiwan
- Education: National Chengchi University (BA); Ohio State University (MA, PhD)

Cheng Jei-cheng (Chinese: 鄭瑞城; pinyin: Zhèng Ruìchéng; born November 6, 1946) was a Taiwanese academic who was the Minister of Education of Taiwan from 2008 to 2009, serving in the cabinet of President Ma Ying-jeou. Prior to his appointment, Cheng served as president of National Chengchi University.

== Early life and education ==
Cheng was born on November 6, 1946, in Suao Township and graduated from National Chengchi University with a bachelor's degree in journalism in 1969. He then completed graduate studies in the United States, where he earned a Master of Arts (M.A.) in journalism in 1975 and his Ph.D. in mass communications and communication theory in 1978, both from Ohio State University under professors Victor D. Wall Jr. and Thomas A. McCain. His doctoral dissertation was titled, "Media policies and national developmental characteristics of sixteen Asian countries".

== Early career ==
Cheng worked as a professor at National Chiao Tung University, dean of the College of Communication of NCCU and president of NCCU.

Government offices
Preceded by Tu Cheng-sheng	ROC Minister of Education; 2008–2009	Succeeded by Wu Ching-ji
