= Chiu Chang-yueh =

Taiwanese politician

Chiu Chang-yueh (Chinese: 邱昌嶽) is a Taiwanese politician.

== Political career ==
By 2014, Chiu had taken office as deputy minister of the interior under Chen Wei-zen. Frequently, he was called upon to make public comments on law enforcement and emergency services. Chiu remained deputy interior minister as the Ma Ying-jeou presidential administration was replaced by that of Tsai Ing-wen. Chiu was called before the Legislative Yuan to discuss amendments to the Social Order Maintenance Act permitting penalties to be levied against people who misused the 1-1-0 emergency telephone number, which passed in May 2016. Chiu helped coordinate security for the 2017 Summer Universiade and private events. He also presided over naturalization ceremonies for Mary Paul Watts, O Anuna, and Gian Carlo Michelini. In 2018, Chiu commented on several topics, among them missing aircraft, proposed revisions to building codes, a bill regarding the financial records of private foundations, and proposed legislation on stalking and harassment. In September 2019, Chiu was nominated to fill a seat on the Central Election Commission, for which he was confirmed by the Legislative Yuan in October 2019.
