= Tu Cheng-sheng =

Taiwanese politician

- 杜正勝
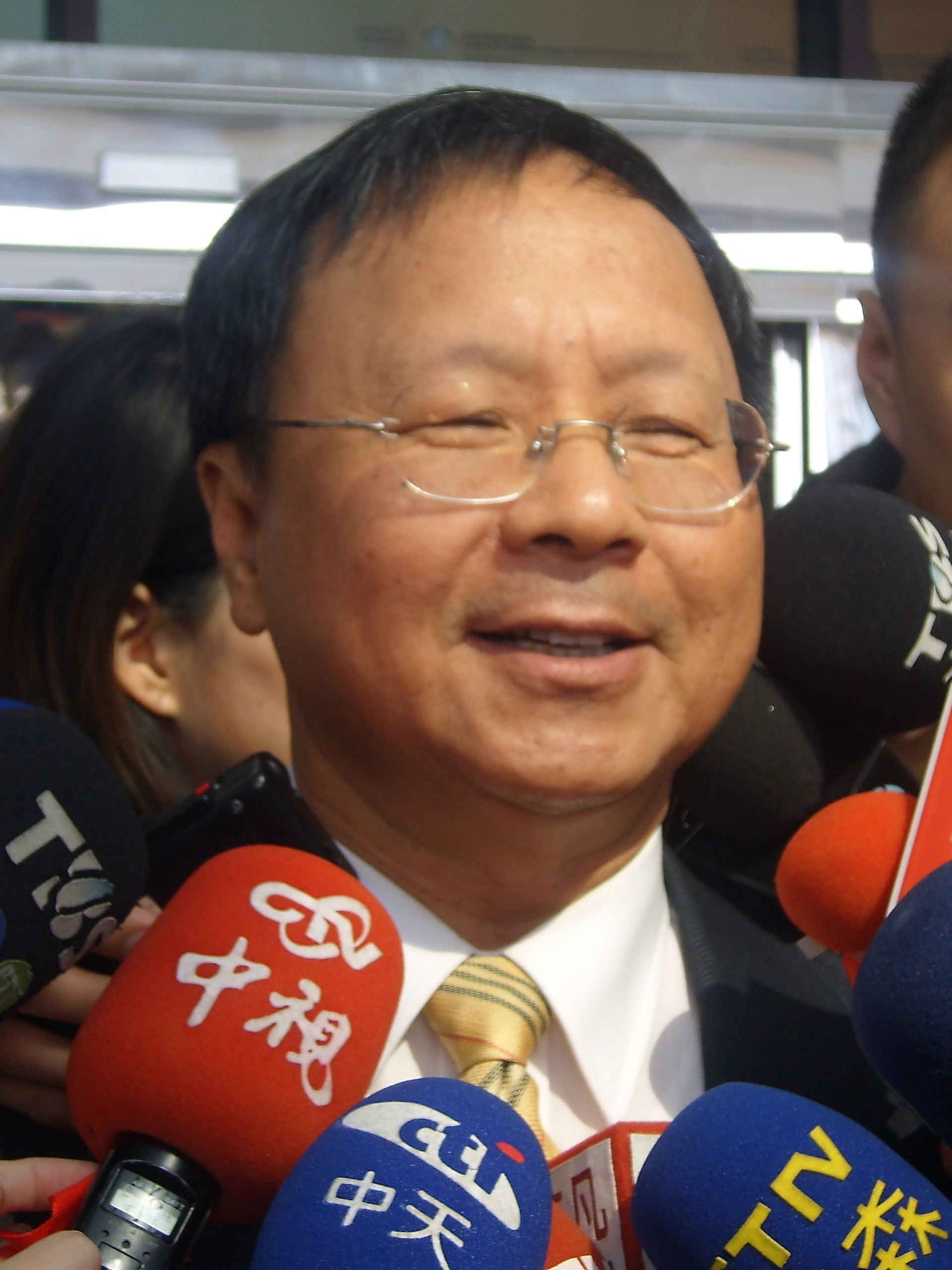
- Minister Tu in 2007

22nd Minister of Education of the Republic of China
- In office 20 May 2004 – 20 May 2008

Director of National Palace Museum
- In office 20 May 2000 – 20 May 2004

Personal details
- Born: June 10, 1944 (age 81) Mida Village, Okayama District, Takao Prefecture, Japanese Taiwan (vic. modern-day Mituo District, Kaohsiung, Taiwan)
- Party: Democratic Progressive Party
- Education: National University of Tainan; National Taiwan University (BA, MA)

Tu Cheng-sheng
- Traditional Chinese: 杜正勝
Transcriptions
Standard Mandarin
- Hanyu Pinyin: Dù Zhèngshèng
- Wade–Giles: Tu^{4} Cheng^{4}-sheng^{4}
- IPA: [tû ʈʂə̂ŋʂə̂ŋ]
Southern Min
- Hokkien POJ: Tō͘ Chèng-sèng

Tu Cheng-sheng (Chinese: 杜正勝; Pe̍h-ōe-jī: Tō͘ Chèng-sèng; born 10 June 1944) is a Taiwanese politician and historian. Tu served as the minister of education of the Republic of China during Chen Shui-bian's second term as president.

== Education and career ==
Tu Cheng-sheng graduated from the Provincial Tainan Normal University (present-day National University of Tainan) in 1966. He also attended the National Taiwan University in 1970 and majored in history. He earned his bachelor's degree in 1970 and his master's degree in 1974. He is a specialist in the history of ancient Chinese society, culture and medicine.

In articles of 1986, 1987 and 1992 Tu explored semblance between the city-states of the ancients Western civilization and the state formations of early China.

He served as Director of National Palace Museum from May 2000 to May 2004. He also served as a director of a research center on history and languages of the Academia Sinica and a professor at the National Tsing Hua University.

== Personality ==
Tu gained notoriety for his colorful and abrasive behavior. After being filmed asleep at a 2007 meeting of the Legislative Yuan, he was photographed picking his nose in response to public criticism. Also that year, he grabbed a reporter's microphone and shoved a cameraman into a wall.

== Publications ==
- 杜正勝 (2000). 走過關鍵十年 / 1990-2000 [Going Through the Ten Critical Years: 1990-2000] (in Chinese). ISBN 957-469-141-1.
- 杜正勝 (2003). 臺灣的誕生 : 十七世紀的福爾摩沙 [The Birth of Taiwan: Formosa in the 17th Century] (in Chinese). ISBN 957-28159-1-1., translation: Ilha Formosa: the Emergence of Taiwan on the World Scene in the 17th Century
- 杜正勝 (2004). 新史學之路 [New Road for Historical Studies] (in Chinese). ISBN 957-14-4027-2.
- 臺灣的教育改革與臺灣的未來 [Educational Reform in Taiwan: Retrospect and Prospect] (in Chinese). 2007. OCLC 173372350.

Government offices
Preceded by Chin Hsiao-yi	Director of National Palace Museum; 2000–2004	Succeeded by Shih Shou-chien
Preceded by Huang Jong-tsun	ROC Minister of Education; 2004–2008	Succeeded by Cheng Jei-cheng
