= Pan Wen-chung =

Taiwanese educator and politician

- 潘文忠
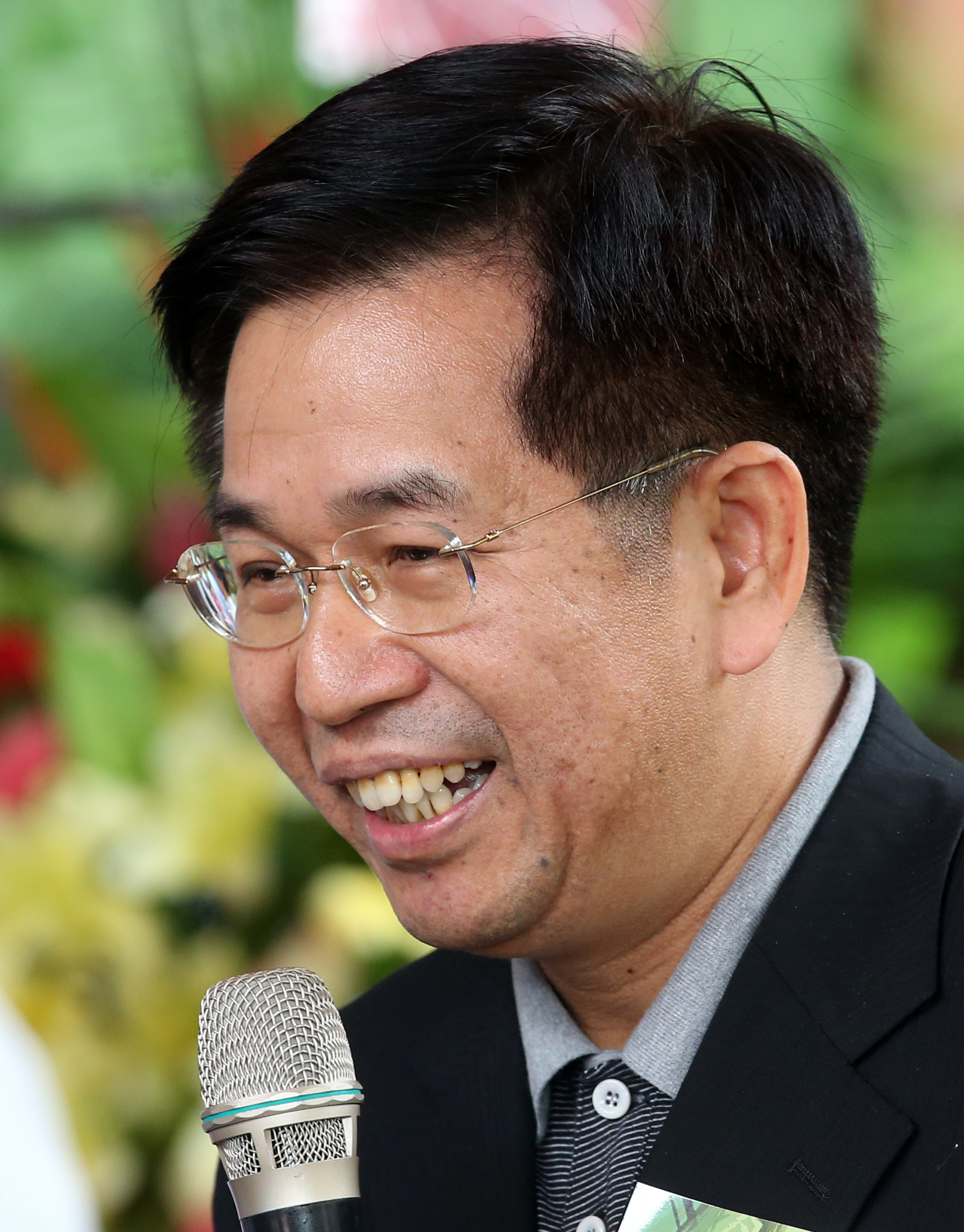
- Pan in 2019

27th and 30th Minister of Education
- In office 14 January 2019 – 20 May 2024
- Premier: Su Tseng-chang; Chen Chien-jen
- Deputy: See list: Fan Sun-lu Lio Mon-chi Lin Teng-chiao
- Preceded by: Yao Leeh-ter (acting)
- Succeeded by: Cheng Ying-yao
- In office 20 May 2016 – 14 April 2018
- Premier: Lin Chuan; William Lai
- Deputy: See list: Chen Liang-gee Tsai Ching-hwa Lin Teng-chiao
- Preceded by: Wu Se-hwa
- Succeeded by: Yao Leeh-ter (acting)

Deputy Mayor of Taichung
- In office 25 December 2014 – 19 May 2016
- Mayor: Lin Chia-lung

Personal details
- Born: 28 November 1962 (age 63) Zhuangwei, Yilan County, Taiwan
- Party: Independent
- Education: National Taiwan Normal University (BEd, MEd, PhD)

Pan Wen-chung (Chinese: 潘文忠; pinyin: Pān Wénzhōng; Wade–Giles: Pʻan¹ Wên²-Chung¹; born 28 November 1962) is a Taiwanese educator and politician. He first served as Minister of Education from May 2016 to April 2018 and returned to the post in January 2019.

== Education ==
Pan obtained his teaching certificate from Taiwan Provincial Junior Teachers’ College in 1983. He then graduated from National Taiwan Normal University with a B.Ed. in 1989, an M.Ed. in 1993, and a Ph.D. in education in 2003. His master's thesis was titled, "A study on the relationship between organizational structure type and teacher morale in junior high schools". His doctoral dissertation was titled, "A study of the professional certification system for elementary and junior high school principals" (國民中小學校長專業證照制度之研究).

== Ministry of Education ==
Pan was named Minister of Education in April 2016, and took office on 20 May. On 13 October 2016, Pan unveiled the Youth Employment Pilot Program at the Executive Yuan to help the low income high school graduates to college or careers in which those qualified will get a NT$5,000 monthly subsidy. He resigned from the education ministry in April 2018, over the controversy regarding the selection of Kuan Chung-ming as president of National Taiwan University. Pan was reappointed education minister in January 2019.
