= David H. Warren =

Academic administrator and educator

Chancellor of the University of California, Riverside
- In office March 2002 – July 2002
- Preceded by: Raymond L. Orbach
- Succeeded by: France A. Córdova

David H. Warren is an academic administrator and educator. He served as the acting chancellor at the University of California, Riverside from March, 2002 through July 2002. He bridged the tenures of Raymond L. Orbach and France Córdova.

Warren is a professor emeritus in the Department of Psychology at UCR. He also served as the dean of the College of Humanities, Arts and Social Sciences and the chair of the department of psychology.

== Education ==
He earned his degree from Yale in 1965, then completed his Ph.D. in child development from the University of Minnesota.
