= Wang Li-ping =

Taiwanese activist and politician

Wang Li-ping (Chinese: 王麗萍; born 6 August 1962) is a Taiwanese activist and politician.

== Education and career ==
Wang studied Chinese literature at National Chengchi University. Between 1986 and 1994, she was a member of the Yunlin County Council. Wang replaced Fan Sun-lu on the Democratic Progressive Party list and Fan's seat on the Legislative Yuan on 26 May 2000, as Fan was appointed a political deputy minister of education. While a sitting legislator, Wang joined a petition alongside colleagues Chang Ching-fang and Wang Sing-nan. They asked the Control Yuan to investigate Pan Hsi-hsien, who visited China in June 2000, days after retiring from his post at the National Security Bureau, for potential national security concerns. In May 2001, Wang advocated for mutual respect amongst ethnic groups, and criticized the Kuomintang for seeking excessive control over the budget.

After stepping down from the Legislative Yuan, Wang returned to activism. She founded Sister Radio, a radio station run by women about women's rights and related issues. The station began broadcasting on 8 March 2002, International Women's Day, and on the next IWD, shifted to broadcast a 24-hour schedule. In May 2004, the Government Information Office fined Sister Radio for playing sex sounds on air during a segment comparing lesbian intercourse with heterosexual intercourse.

Wang served as a spokesperson for the Million Voices campaign seeking the resignation of president Chen Shui-bian throughout 2006. In August, Wang claimed that people affiliated with the Pan-Green Coalition were planning to assassinate Shih Ming-teh, the leader of the Million Voices campaign. While attending a rally associated with the movement in September, Wang stated, "we, the people of the Republic of Taiwan, will not be defeated by some rain." Pan-Blue supporters of the campaign made their disapproval to her reference of the Taiwan independence movement known until she left the stage. The Million Voices campaign organized a protest at Taipei Main Station during National Day, but did not apply for the appropriate permits, in contravention of the Assembly and Parade Law. In August 2007, Wang was one of sixteen people indicted for this violation. The Taipei District Court ruled in February 2009 that none of the accused were guilty.

In May 2017, Wang participated in a demonstration at Douliu railway station, calling on the Yunlin County Government to let Formosa Petrochemical's license for coal-fired boilers lapse.

After Taiwanese activist Lee Ming-che was detained by China in March 2017, Wang Li-ping applied to the Taiwan Affairs Office for permission to accompany Lee's wife, Ching-yu, to Lee Ming-che's trial. Wang traveled to China alongside Lee Ching-yu, but was deported. In December 2017, Wang opined that society was unsupportive of Lee Ming-che's plight, and observed that Lee Ching-yu was targeted by a smear campaign alleging that she was seeking a career in politics.
