= Yao Leeh-ter =

Taiwanese electrical engineer, computer engineer, and politician

Leether Yao Leeh-ter
- 姚立德
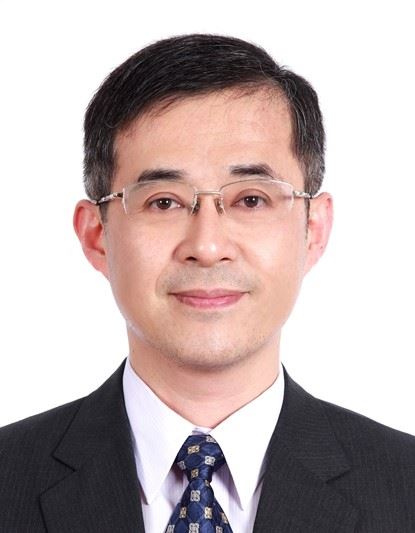
- Official portrait, 2020

Member of the Examination Yuan
- In office 1 September 2020 – 31 August 2024
- Appointed by: Tsai Ing-wen

Acting Minister of Education
- In office 26 December 2018 – 13 January 2019
- Prime Minister: William Lai
- Preceded by: Yeh Jiunn-rong
- Succeeded by: Pan Wen-chung
- In office 30 May 2018 – 15 July 2018
- Prime Minister: William Lai
- Preceded by: Wu Maw-kuen
- Succeeded by: Yeh Jiunn-rong
- In office 15 April 2018 – 18 April 2018
- Prime Minister: William Lai
- Preceded by: Pan Wen-chung
- Succeeded by: Wu Maw-kuen

Political Deputy Minister of Education
- In office September 2017 – 13 January 2019
- Minister: Wu Maw-kuen; Yeh Jiunn-rong
- Deputy: Lin Teng-chiao (administrative)

Personal details
- Born: 4 September 1962 (age 63) Taipei, Taiwan
- Party: Independent
- Education: National Taipei University of Technology (BS); Missouri University of Science and Technology (MS); University of Wisconsin–Madison (PhD)

Leether Yao Leeh-ter (Chinese: 姚立德; pinyin: Yáo Lìdé) is a Taiwanese electrical engineer, computer engineer, and politician. He was appointed political deputy minister of Education in September 2017 and resigned the position in January 2019.

== Early life and education ==
Yao was born in Taipei on September 4, 1962. His parents were Yao Chi-Tao and Su Shy-pin.

Yao graduated from National Taipei University of Technology with a bachelor's degree in electrical engineering in 1982. He then earned a Master of Science (M.S.) in electrical engineering from the Missouri University of Science and Technology in 1987 and his Ph.D. in electrical engineering and computer engineering from the University of Wisconsin–Madison in 1992. His doctoral dissertation, completed under William Sethares, was titled, "Parameter estimation for nonlinear systems."

== See also ==
- Education in Taiwan
