= Ovid Tzeng =

Taiwanese politician

Tseng Chih-lang
- 曾志朗
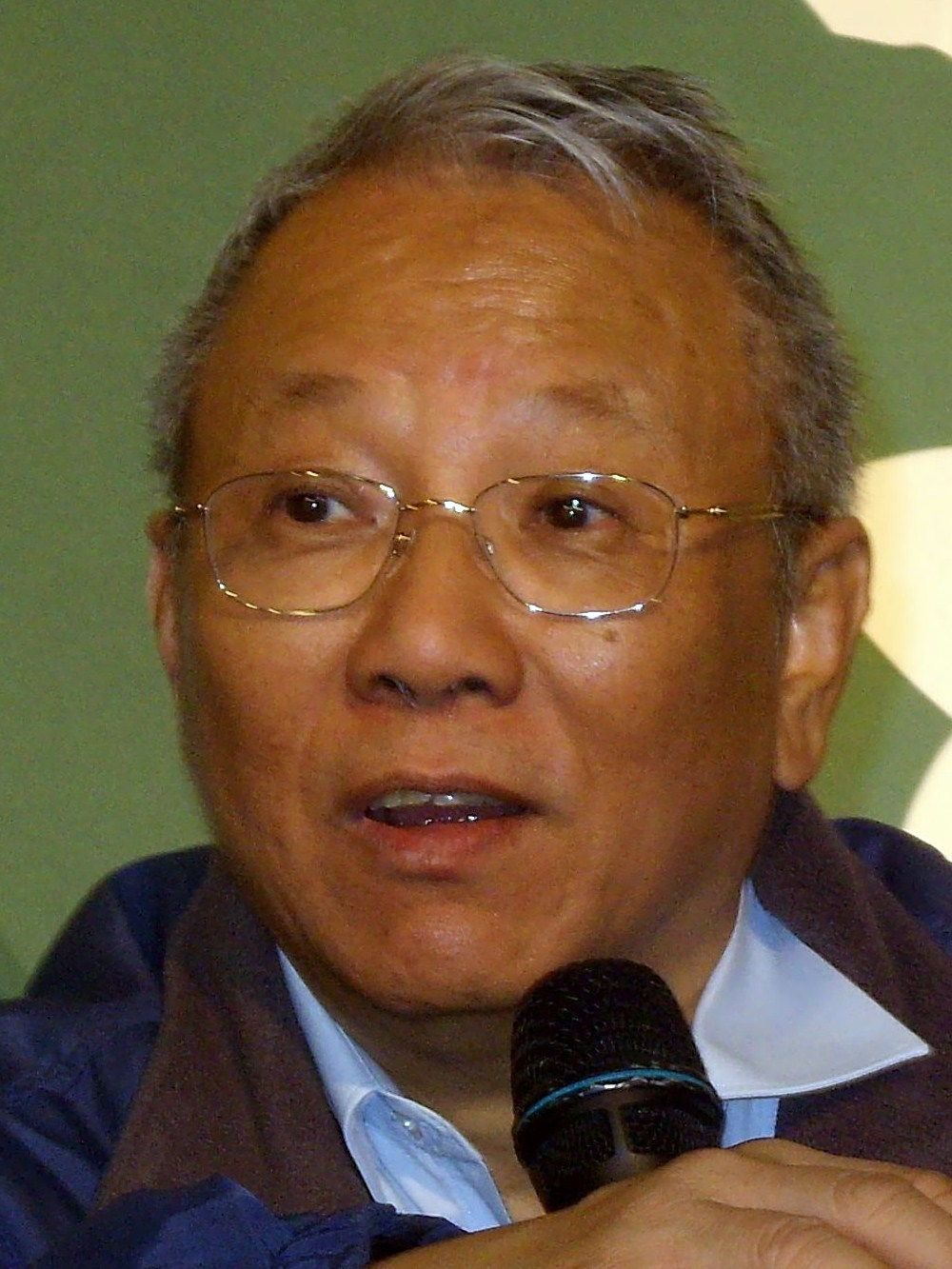

13th Minister of Cultural Affairs
- In office 28 November 2011 – 5 February 2012
- Prime Minister: Wu Den-yih
- Preceded by: Emile Sheng
- Succeeded by: Lin Chin-tian (acting); Lung Ying-tai

Minister without Portfolio for Culture and Education
- In office 20 May 2008 – 5 February 2012
- Prime Minister: Liu Chao-shiuan; Wu Den-yih

20th Minister of Education
- In office 20 May 2000 – 1 February 2002
- Prime Minister: Tang Fei; Chang Chun-hsiung
- Preceded by: Yang Chao-hsiang
- Succeeded by: Huang Jong-tsun

Personal details
- Born: 8 September 1944 (age 81) Kizan District, Takao Prefecture, Taiwan, Empire of Japan (modern-day Cishan, Kaohsiung, Taiwan)
- Spouse: Daisy L. Hung
- Education: National Chengchi University (BA, MA); Pennsylvania State University (PhD)

Tseng Chih-lang (Chinese: 曾志朗; pinyin: Zēng Zhìlǎng; Wade–Giles: Tseng Chih-lang; born 8 September 1944), also known by his English name Ovid Tzeng, is a Taiwanese psychologist and politician. He was Minister of Education from 2000 to 2002 and Minister of the Council for Cultural Affairs from 2011 to 2012.

== Education ==
Tseng graduated from National Chengchi University with a Bachelor of Arts (B.A.) in education in 1966 and a Master of Arts (M.A.) in educational psychology in 1969. He then earned a Ph.D. in experimental psychology from Pennsylvania State University in 1973.
