= Yeh Jiunn-rong =

Taiwanese legal scholar and academic

- 葉俊榮
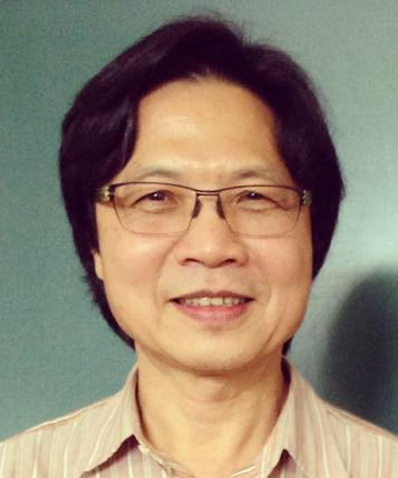
- Official portrait, 2016

29th Minister of Education
- In office 16 July 2018 – 25 December 2018
- Prime Minister: William Lai
- Deputy: Yao Leeh-ter; Lin Teng-chiao
- Preceded by: Yao Leeh-ter (acting)
- Succeeded by: Yao Leeh-ter (acting)

31st Minister of the Interior
- In office 20 May 2016 – 15 July 2018
- Prime Minister: Lin Chuan; William Lai
- Deputy: Lin Tzu-ling; Chiu Chang-yueh
- Preceded by: Chen Wei-zen
- Succeeded by: Hsu Kuo-yung

12th Minister of Research, Development and Evaluation Commission
- In office June 2004 – April 2006
- Prime Minister: Yu Shyi-kun; Frank Hsieh; Su Tseng-chang
- Deputy: Jay N. Shih
- Preceded by: Lin Chia-cheng
- Succeeded by: Jay N. Shih

Minister without Portfolio
- In office 1 May 2002 – 19 May 2004
- Prime Minister: Yu Shyi-kun

Personal details
- Born: October 1958 (age 67) Wanhua District, Taipei City, Taiwan
- Party: Democratic Progressive Party
- Education: National Taiwan University (LLB, LLM); Yale University (LLM, JSD)

Yeh Jiunn-rong (Chinese: 葉俊榮; pinyin: Yè Jùnróng; born October 1958) is a Taiwanese legal scholar and academic who served as Minister of Education in 2018 and previously as Minister of the Interior from 2016 to 2018. He is a chair professor of law at Taipei School of Economics and Political Science, National Tsing Hua University.

== Education ==
Yeh graduated from National Taiwan University with his Bachelor of Laws (LL.B.) and master's degree in law in 1981 and 1985, respectively. He then was awarded a Fulbright Fellowship to complete advanced studies in the United States at Yale University, where he earned a second Master of Laws (LL.M.) in 1986 and his Doctor of Juridical Science (J.S.D.) in 1988 from Yale Law School. His doctoral dissertation was titled, "The Second Generation of Environmental Regulation: The Economic Incentive Approach".

== Early career ==
Yeh was an associate professor on the Faculty of Law of NTU from 1988 to 1993 and served as professor from 1993 onward. He was also a visiting professor and scholar at Columbia University, Duke University, Hong Kong University and University of Toronto during 1995–2000. He was also a visiting lecturer to the Law School of Zhejiang University in 2011–2012.

== Political career ==
Yeh led the Research, Development and Evaluation Commission from 2004 to 2006. He returned to public service in 2016, taking office as Minister of the Interior on 20 May. He was named Minister of Education in July 2018. Yeh resigned as education minister on 25 December 2018, a day after announcing that the ministry confirmed Kuan Chung-ming's selection as president of National Taiwan University, outstanding since January 2018.
