= National Taiwan Arts Education Center =

Education center in Zhongzheng, Taipei, Taiwan

- 國立臺灣藝術教育館
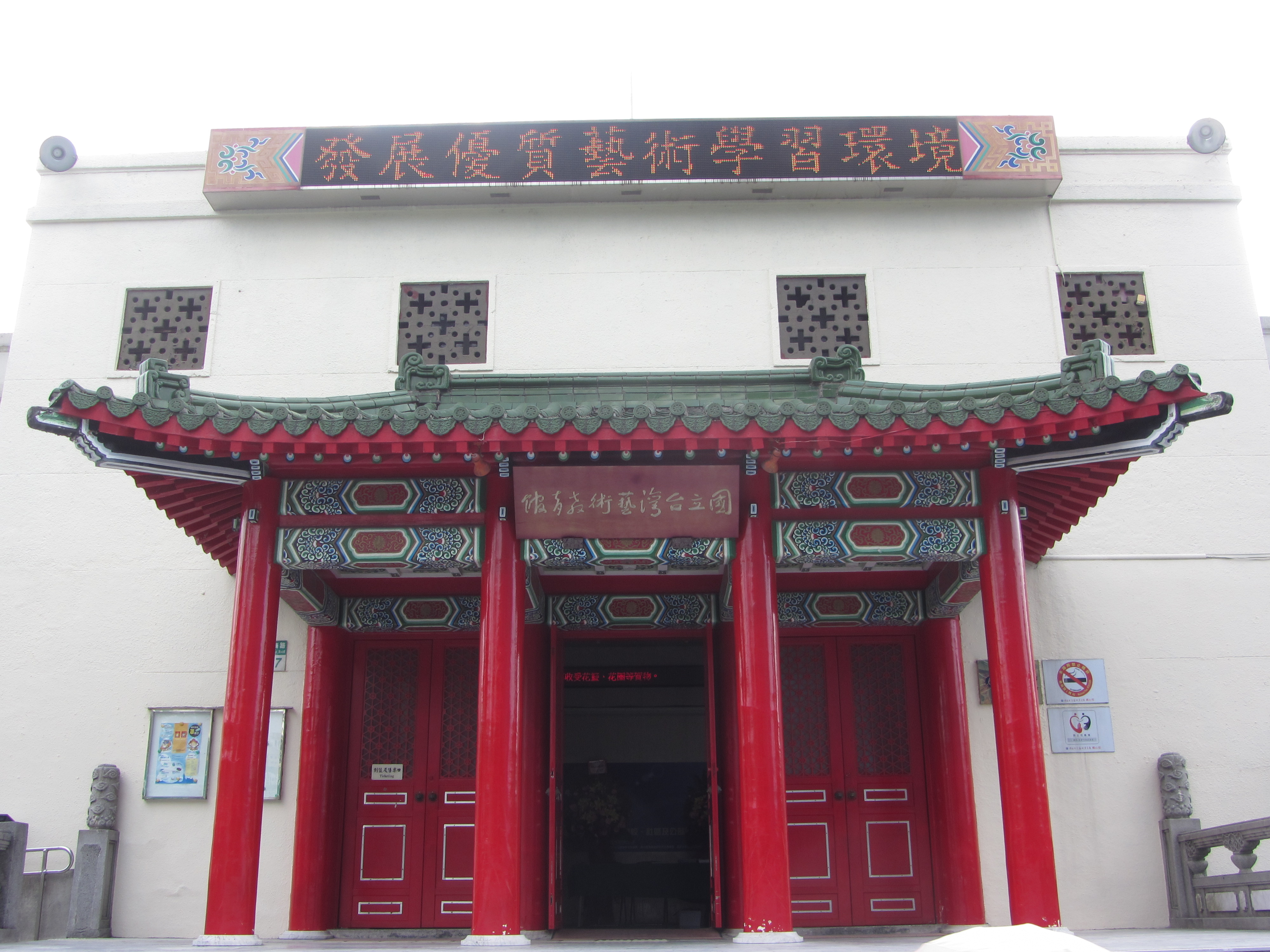
- Interactive map of the National Taiwan Arts Education Center area

General information
- Location: Zhongzheng, Taipei, Taiwan
- Coordinates: 25°01′54″N 121°30′42″E
- Opened: 29 March 1957 (as National Center of Arts); 23 October 1985 (as National Taiwan Arts Education Center)
- Owner: Ministry of Education

Website
- Official website

The National Taiwan Arts Education Center (traditional Chinese: 國立臺灣藝術教育館; simplified Chinese: 国立台湾艺术教育馆; pinyin: Guólì Táiwān Yìshù Jiàoyùguǎn) is an educational center in Taipei Botanical Garden, Zhongzheng District, Taipei, Taiwan.

== History ==
The center was originally built inside the Taipei Botanical Garden in 1956. It was then opened on 29 March 1957 as National Center of Arts. On 23 October 1985, it changed its name to National Taiwan Arts Education Center.

== Transportation ==
The educational center is accessible within walking distance west from Chiang Kai-shek Memorial Hall Station of the Taipei Metro.

== See also ==
- List of tourist attractions in Taiwan
