= Maw-Kuen Wu =

Taiwanese physicist (born 1949)

- 吳茂昆
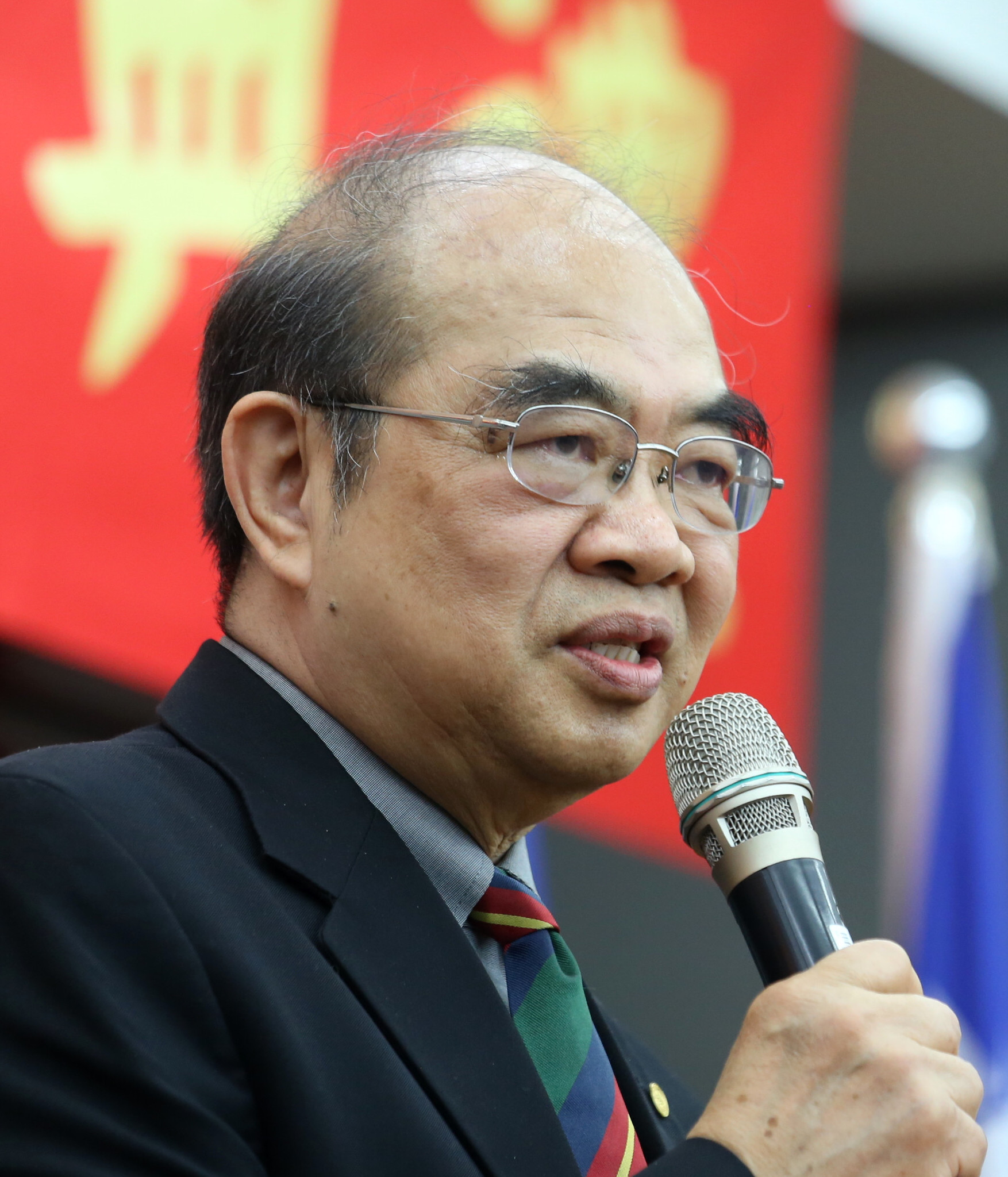
- Wu in 2018

28th Minister of Education
- In office 19 April 2018 – 30 May 2018
- Prime Minister: William Lai
- Deputy: Yao Leeh-ter
- Preceded by: Yao Leeh-ter (acting)
- Succeeded by: Yao Leeh-ter (acting)

6th President of National Dong Hwa University
- In office January 2012 – 23 January 2016
- Preceded by: Wen-Shu Hwang
- Succeeded by: Han-Chieh Chao

11th Minister of the National Science Council
- In office 20 May 2004 – 25 January 2006
- Prime Minister: Yu Shyi-kun; Frank Hsieh
- Preceded by: Wei Che-ho
- Succeeded by: Chen Chien-jen

Personal details
- Born: 6 December 1949 (age 76) Yuli Township, Hualien County, Taiwan
- Party: Democratic Progressive Party
- Education: Tamkang University (BS, MS); University of Houston (PhD)
- Scientific career
- Awards: Comstock Prize in Physics (1988)
- Fields: Physics
- Workplaces: University of Houston; University of Alabama in Huntsville; Columbia University; National Tsing Hua University; National Science Council; Academia Sinica; National Dong Hwa University
- Thesis: High pressure study on some unusual magnetic and superconducting materials (1981)

Maw-Kuen Wu (Chinese: 吳茂昆; pinyin: Wú Màokūn; born December 6, 1949) is a Taiwanese physicist specializing in superconductivity, low-temperature physics, and high-pressure physics. He was a professor of physics at University of Alabama in Huntsville, Columbia University, and National Tsing Hua University, the Director of the Institute of Physics at Academia Sinica, the President of National Dong Hwa University, and is currently a distinguished research fellow of the Institute of Physics, Academia Sinica, and international member of National Academy of Sciences.

== Early life and education ==
Wu was born in 1949 in Yuli Township, Hualien County, Taiwan. He was the youngest of eleven children, and his mother died when he was young. His family experienced financial difficulties after his father became ill and could no longer sustain his business, prompting several of Wu's older siblings to leave school and begin working. He attended Yuli Elementary School, located near the Xiuguluan River.

After junior high school, Wu attended Hualien High School for six years. He then enrolled at Tamkang University in 1969, studying physics. As an undergraduate, he also studied English and Japanese, and developed an interest in superconductivity. He graduated with a Bachelor of Science in physics in 1973. He then earned a Master of Science in physics from the university in 1975.

In 1977, Wu went to the United States to pursue graduate studies in solid-state physics at the University of Houston, where he had won an academic scholarship. He earned his Ph.D. in physics from the university in 1981. That same year, he coauthored a paper examining the effects of pressure on the electrical resistance and superconducting transition temperature of barium–lead–bismuth oxide. His doctoral dissertation was titled, High Pressure Study on Some Unusual Magnetic and Superconducting Materials.

== Career ==
Wu worked as a research scientist at his alma mater for two years, before being taken on as an assistant professor of physics at the University of Alabama in Huntsville, and then subsequently promoted to professor in 1987. Along with Chu Ching-wu and Jim Ashburn, Wu made the historic discovery of superconductivity above 77 K in YBCO in 1987. According to the Science Citation Index by Web of Science, Wu's 1987 work "Superconductivity at 93 K in a new mixed-phase Y-Ba-Cu-O compound system at ambient pressure" in Physical Review Letters (American Physical Society) has been cited for more than five thousand times by journal articles and is considered influential in applied science and business. Wu was then invited to teach at the National Tsing Hua University, and conduct further research in high-temperature superconductivity.

Maw-Kuen Wu first entered the cabinet; served as minister of the National Science Council from 2004 to 2006. In 2018, he was named as the minister of the Ministry of Education and resigned after 41 days. Wu was subsequently impeached by the Control Yuan, which charged him with violating the Public Functionary Service Act and the Act on the Recusal of Public Servants Due to Conflict of Interest.

== Personal life ==
Maw-Kuen Wu and his wife have two children.

== Academic honors ==
- 1988 USA Chinese Association of Engineering Annual Award
- 1988 State of Alabama Resolution
- 1988 University of Alabama Research Award
- 1988 U.S.A. National Academy of Sciences Comstock Prize
- 1989 Tamkang Golden Eagle Award
- 1994 Fellow, Chinese Physical Society
- 1994 Bernd T. Matthias Prize
- 1995 Y. T. Lee Outstanding Scientist Award
- 1998 NASA Special Awards
- 1998 Member, Academia Sinica
- 2007 Ettore Majorana-Erice-Science for Peace Prize
- 2009 Taiwanese-American Foundation (TAF) Award
- 2010-03 Germany Humboldt Research Award

Academic offices
Preceded by Yong-De Yao	Director of the Academia Sinica Institute of Physics; 2002–	Succeeded by Incumbent
