= Ministry of Education (Taiwan) =

Taiwanese government agency

Ministry of Education, Republic of China (Taiwan)
- 教育部 ㄐㄧㄠˋ ㄩˋ ㄅㄨˋ; Jiàoyùbù (Taiwanese Mandarin); Kàu-io̍k-pō͘ (Taiwanese Hokkien); Kau-yuk Phu (Taiwanese Hakka)
- Emblem of the Ministry of Education

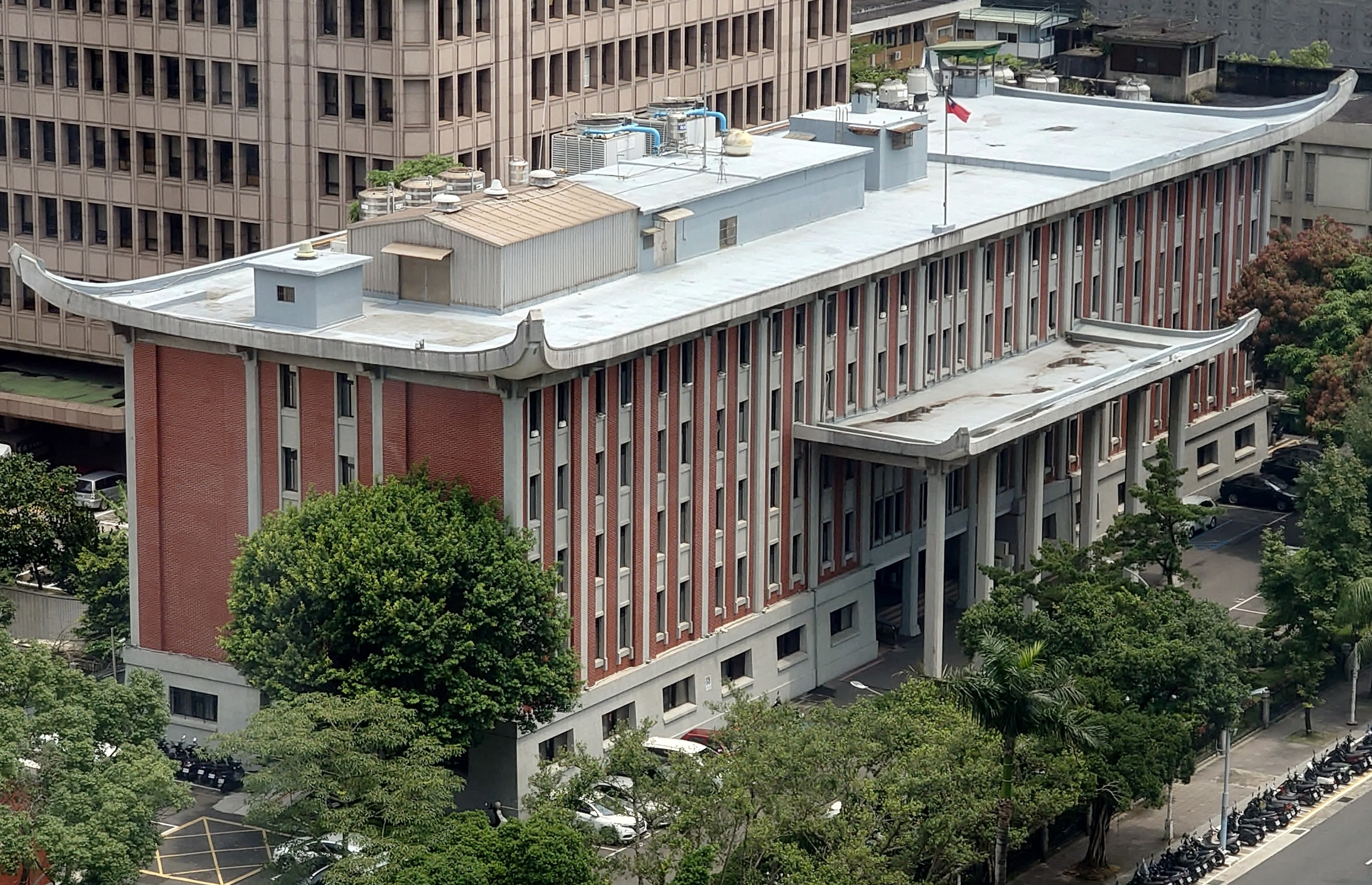

Agency overview
- Formed: 1905 (Qing dynasty); January 1912 (Beiyang government in Beijing); 11 December 1928 (Nationalist government in Nanjing; 31 May 1948 (current form); 10 March 1950 (re-establishment in Taipei)
- Jurisdiction: Republic of China
- Headquarters: Zhongzheng, Taipei
- Minister responsible: Cheng Ying-yao
- Website: english.moe.gov.tw

The Ministry of Education (MOE; Chinese: 教育部; pinyin: Jiàoyùbù; Pe̍h-ōe-jī: Kàu-io̍k-pō͘; Zhuyin Fuhao: ㄐㄧㄠˋ ㄩˋ ㄅㄨˋ; Pha̍k-fa-sṳ: Kau-yuk Phu) is the cabinet-level ministry of the Republic of China (Taiwan) responsible for formulating educational policies, managing public schools, and overseeing local educational administrative agencies.

== History ==
The Taiwanese education ministry's origin goes back to the Ministry of Education, Science, Sports and Culture under the Imperial Japanese government, which took over Taiwan in 1895. During Japanese colonial rule, school attendance among Taiwanese children increased from 3.8% in 1904 to 71.3% in 1943, and literacy became widespread in Taiwan. Modern schools were formed with widespread establishment of primary schools while higher schooling for Taiwanese people remained rare and secondary schools and colleges were mostly for Japanese nationals. In special cases, some Taiwanese were able to pursue higher education, and many traveled to Japan for further studies.

The current government of Taiwan, officially known as the Republic of China (ROC), was formed in mainland China in 1912. After the retreat of the ROC government to Taiwan in 1949, the ROC Ministry of Education was re-established in Taipei.

In 2022, in response to complaints from higher education institutions about the weekly cap on inbound visitors, the MOE reserved extra slots for foreign students to ensure they are not prevented from entering Taiwan.

== International partnerships ==
In 2017, the Ministry of Education (MOE) launched the New Southbound Talent Development Program to promote educational exchange with India.

In November 2023, Montana governor Greg Gianforte announced that the Montana Office of the Commissioner of Higher Education signed a new memorandum of understanding with the Taiwanese MOE to create a Mandarin Chinese language program at the University of Montana in Missoula and an educational exchange program at Montana Technological University. This partnership followed a first wave of Montana Tech students who, after a 2022 MOU, studied at the Minghsin University of Science and Technology.

In December 2023, the MOE hosted a delegation from the University of Scranton led by Joseph G. Marina to explore partnerships with Taiwanese universities. The trip followed a series of exchanges between the university and the MOE, leading to Taiwanese cultural programs, lectures, and film festivals in Scranton starting in 2010.

== Organizational structure ==
The following is a list of political departments, administrative departments and agencies under the Ministry of Education:

=== Political departments ===
- Department of Planning
- Department of Higher Education
- Department of Technological and Vocational Education
- Department of Lifelong Education
- Department of International and Cross-Strait Education
- Department of Teacher and Art Education
- Department of Information and Technology Education
- Department of Student Affairs and Special Education

=== Administrative departments ===
- Department of Secretarial Affairs
- Department of Personnel
- Department of Civil Service Ethics
- Department of Accounting
- Department of Statistics
- Department of Legal Affairs
- Supervisory Committee Managing Retirement, Compensation, Resignation and Severance Matters for Private School Teachers and Staff

=== Agencies ===
- K-12 Education Administration
- Youth Development Administration
- National Academy for Educational Research
- National Central Library
- National Museum of Marine Biology and Aquarium
- National Museum of Natural Science
- National Science and Technology Museum
- National Taiwan Science Education Center
- National Education Radio
- National Library of Public Information
- National Taiwan Library
- National Taiwan Arts Education Center
- National Museum of Marine Science and Technology
- National Sports Training Center
- Taiwan Institute of Sport Science

== List of overseas offices ==
The following is a list of overseas offices:

Country	City	Name of office
Canada	Ottawa	Education Division, Taipei Economic and Cultural Office in Canada
Canada	Vancouver	Education Division, Taipei Economic and Cultural Office in Vancouver
United States	Washington, D.C.	Education Division, Taipei Economic and Cultural Representative Office in the United States
United States	Boston	Education Division, Taipei Economic and Cultural Office in Boston
United States	New York City	Education Division, Taipei Economic and Cultural Office in New York
United States	Chicago	Education Division, Taipei Economic and Cultural Office in Chicago
United States	Houston	Education Division, Taipei Economic and Cultural Office in Houston
United States	Los Angeles	Education Division, Taipei Economic and Cultural Office in Los Angeles
United States	San Francisco	Education Division, Taipei Economic and Cultural Office in San Francisco
Paraguay	Asunción	Oficina del Consejero de Educación, Embajada de la República de China (Taiwán) en Paraguay
Russia	Moscow	Education Division, Representative Office in Moscow for the Taipei-Moscow Economic and Cultural Coordination Commission
France	Paris	Service Education, Bureau de Représentation de Taipei en France
Belgium	Brussels	Education Division, Taipei Representative Office in the EU and Belgium
Germany	Berlin	Abteilung für Bildung, Taipeh Vertretung in der Bundesrepublik Deutschland
United Kingdom	London	Education Division, Taipei Representative Office in the U.K.
Austria	Vienna	Education Division, Taipei Economic and Cultural Office in Austria
Sweden	Stockholm	Education Division, Taipei Mission in Sweden
Poland	Warsaw	Education Division, Taipei Representative Office in Poland
Japan	Tokyo	Education Division, Taipei Economic and Cultural Representative Office in Japan
Japan	Osaka	Taipei Economic and Cultural Office in Osaka
Japan	Fukuoka	Taipei Economic and Cultural Office in Fukuoka
Singapore	Singapore	Education Division, Taipei Economic and Cultural Office in Singapore
Republic of Korea	Seoul	Education Division, Taipei Mission in Korea
India	New Delhi	Education Division, Taipei Economic and Cultural Center in New Delhi
Malaysia	Kuala Lumpur	Education Division, Taipei Economic and Cultural Office in Malaysia
Australia	Barton, ACT	Education Division, Taipei Economic and Cultural Office in Australia
Thailand	Bangkok	Taipei Economic and Cultural Office in Thailand
Vietnam	Ho Chi Minh City	Taipei Economic and Cultural Office in Ho Chi Minh City
China	Hong Kong	Taipei Economic and Cultural Office in Hong Kong
Indonesia	Jakarta	Taipei Economic and Trade Office, Jakarta, Indonesia

== List of ministers ==
Political Party: Kuomintang Non-partisan/ unknown Democratic Progressive Party

№	Name	Term of office		Days	Party	Premier
1	Chu Chia-hua (朱家驊)	31 May 1948	22 December 1948	205	Kuomintang	Weng Wenhao; Sun Fo
2	Mei Yi-chi (梅貽琦)	Did not take office		—	Independent	
—	Chen Hsueh-ping (陳雪屏)	30 December 1948	5 April 1949	96	Kuomintang	Sun Fo; He Yingqin
3	Han Lih-wu (杭立武)	7 April 1949	16 March 1950	343	Kuomintang	He Yingqin; Yan Xishan; Chen Cheng I
4	Cheng Tien-fong (程天放)	16 March 1950	1 June 1954	1538	Kuomintang	Chen Cheng I
5	Chang Chi-yun (張其昀)	1 June 1954	19 July 1958	1509	Kuomintang	Yu Hung-Chun; Chen Cheng II
6	Mei Yi-chi (梅貽琦)	19 July 1958	1 March 1961	956	Independent	Chen Cheng II
7	Huang Chi-lu (黃季陸)	1 March 1961	25 January 1965	1426	Kuomintang	Chen Cheng II; Yen Chia-kan
8	Yen Chen-hsing (閻振興)	25 January 1965	1 July 1969	1618		Yen Chia-kan
9	Chung Chiao-kuang (鍾皎光)	1 July 1969	16 April 1971	654		Yen Chia-kan
10	Lo Yun-ping (羅雲平)	16 April 1971	1 June 1972	412		Yen Chia-kan
11	Chiang Yen-si (蔣彥士)	1 June 1972	25 April 1977	1789	Kuomintang	Chiang Ching-kuo
12	Lee Yuan-tsu (李元簇)	25 April 1977	1 June 1978	402	Kuomintang	Chiang Ching-kuo
13	Chu Hui-sen (朱匯森)	1 June 1978	1 June 1984	2192	Kuomintang	Sun Yun-suan
14	Lee Huan (李煥)	1 June 1984	4 July 1987	1128	Kuomintang	Yu Kuo-hwa
15	Mao Gao-wen (毛高文)	4 July 1987	27 February 1993	2065	Kuomintang	Yu Kuo-hwa; Lee Huan; Hau Pei-tsun
16	Kuo Wei-fan (郭為藩)	27 February 1993	10 June 1996	1199	Kuomintang	Lien Chan
17	Wu Jin (吳京)	10 June 1996	9 February 1998	609	Kuomintang	Lien Chan; Vincent Siew
18	Lin Ching-chiang (林清江)	9 February 1998	15 June 1999	491	Kuomintang	Vincent Siew
19	Yang Chao-hsiang (|楊朝祥)	15 June 1999	20 May 2000	340	Kuomintang	Vincent Siew
20	Ovid Tzeng (曾志朗)	20 May 2000	1 February 2002	622		Tang Fei; Chang Chun-hsiung I
21	Huang Jong-tsun (黃榮村)	1 February 2002	20 May 2004	839	Independent	Yu Shyi-kun
22	Tu Cheng-sheng (杜正勝)	20 May 2004	20 May 2008	1461	Independent	Yu Shyi-kun; Frank Hsieh; Su Tseng-chang I Chang Chun-hsiung II
23	Cheng Jei-cheng (鄭瑞城)	20 May 2008	10 September 2009	478		Liu Chao-shiuan
24	Wu Ching-ji (吳清基)	10 September 2009	6 February 2012	879	Kuomintang	Wu Den-yih
25	Chiang Wei-ling (蔣偉寧)	6 February 2012	14 July 2014	889		Chen Chun; Jiang Yi-huah
—	Chen Der-hwa (陳德華)	14 July 2014	6 August 2014	23		Jiang Yi-huah
26	Wu Se-hwa (吳思華)	6 August 2014	20 May 2016	653		Jiang Yi-huah; Mao Chi-kuo; Chang San-cheng
27	Pan Wen-chung (潘文忠)	20 May 2016	19 April 2018	699		Lin Chuan; William Lai
28	Wu Maw-kuen (吳茂昆)	19 April 2018	29 May 2018	40		William Lai
—	Yao Leeh-ter (姚立德)	30 May 2018	15 July 2018	61		William Lai
29	Yeh Jiunn-rong (葉俊榮)	16 July 2018	25 December 2018	162	Democratic Progressive	William Lai
—	Yao Leeh-ter (姚立德)	26 December 2018	13 January 2019	18		William Lai
(27)	Pan Wen-chung (潘文忠)	14 January 2019	20 May 2024	1953		Su Tseng-chang II; Chen Chien-jen
30	Cheng Ying-yao (鄭英耀)	20 May 2024	Incumbent	810		Cho Jung-tai

== Access ==
The MOE building is accessible by walking distance North East of NTU Hospital Station of the Taipei Metro on the Red Line.
