= Lin (surname) =

Lin (林)
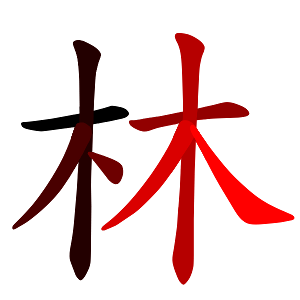
- Pronunciation: Lín (Mandarin pinyin); Lîm (Hokkien and Teochew Pe̍h-ōe-jī); Lam (Cantonese Jyutping); Im (Korean); Lim (Filipino); Liem (Indonesian, Dutch); Ling (Eastern Min, Northern Min, Wu Chinese); Hayashi (Japanese); Lim- (prefix) (Thai), i.e. Limthongkul, Limjaroenrat, etc. Lim- (prefix) or -lim (suffix) (Indonesian, Javanese) i.e. Limantoro/Limantara, Liman, Salim, Halim, etc. Lâm (Vietnamese)
- Language: Chinese

Origin
- Language: Middle Chinese
- Meaning: "Forest", "Woods", "Trees", "Sun Goddess" and "Gemstone"

Lin ([lǐn]; Chinese: 林; pinyin: Lín) is the Mandarin romanization of the Chinese surname written 林, which has many variations depending on the language and is also used in Taiwan, Singapore, Malaysia, Philippines, Indonesia, Japan, Korea (as Im), Myanmar, Vietnam, Thailand, Cambodia.

Among Taiwanese and Chinese families from abroad, it is sometimes pronounced and spelled as Lim because many Chinese descendants are part of the Southern Min diaspora that speak Hokkien or Teochew. In Cantonese-speaking regions such as Hong Kong and Macau it is spelled as Lam or Lum.

It is listed 147th on the Hundred Family Surnames. Within mainland China, it is currently the 18th most common surname.

In Japan, the character 林 is also used but goes by the pronunciation Hayashi, which is the 19th most common surname in Japan.

== Name origin ==
Di Xin (reigned 1154 to 1122 BC), the last king of the Shang dynasty, had three uncles advising him and his administration. The king's uncles were Prince Bi Gan, Prince Jizi, and Prince Weizi. Together the three princes were known as "The Three Kind-Hearted Men of Shang" in the kingdom. Prince Bi Gan was the son of King Wen Ding; he was the brother of Di Xin's father and, thus, was Di Xin's uncle, and served as the prime minister of the Kingdom of Shang.

Di Xin was a cruel king, but his three uncles could not persuade him to change his ways. Failing in their duty to advise the king, Prince Weizi resigned. Prince Jizi faked insanity and was relieved of his post. Only Prince Bi Gan stayed on to continue advising the king to change his ways. "Servants who are afraid of being killed and refrain from telling the truth are not righteous" he said. This put him in danger of incurring the king's wrath. Prince Bi Gan stayed at the palace for three days and nights to try to persuade the blood-thirsty and immoral king to mend his ways.

The stubborn king would not relent and had Prince Bi Gan arrested for treason. Upon hearing this, his pregnant wife escaped into the forest and went into labor there. With no one to help her, she gave birth to a boy in the rocky cave in the forest, in a place called Chang Lin (長林).

Before long, Di Xin was overthrown by Ji Fa, the Count of the West (Western Shang). Ji Fa established a new dynasty named the Zhou dynasty and became the King Wu of Zhou. King Wu knew about the courageous prime minister Prince Bi Gan and sought his wife and child. When he found them, he honoured them in respect of Prince Bi Gan. The mother and child were restored to the Shang royal family. King Wu of Zhou conferred the surname Lin (meaning forest) and the Dukedom of Bo'ling on Prince Bi Gan's son, Lin (Lim/Lam) Jian (林坚), ennobled as the Duke of Bo'ling.

=== Other origins ===
- from Lin Kai (林開), son of the King Ping of Zhou
- from Lin Fang (林放), an official in Lu, also a student of Confucius, during the Spring and Autumn period
- adopted by South China's aboriginal tribes
- adopted by the Qiu Lin (丘林) ethnic Xianbei, family as the surname during the Northern Wei dynasty
- from the personal name of Lin Fu (林父), the given name of an official in the state of Wei during the Spring and Autumn period, whose original surname was Sun.
- from name of a fief granted to an official in the State of Ju during the Spring and Autumn period

== Distribution ==
Within China, 林 is the 2nd most common surname in Hokkien, 4th most common in the city of Haikou, and 10th most common in the city of Guangzhou.

In 2019 it was the 18th most common surname in mainland China.

== Different versions of the name ==
- Among the Malaysian Chinese it is not commonly spelled Lin but rather Lim or Lam. The Hakka, Hokkien, Teochew and Hainan communities romanize it as "Lim" whereas the Cantonese-speaking community uses "Lam".
- The Korean surname Im (임 in South Korean spelling; 림 in North Korean spelling; commonly romanized as Lim or Rim) is the Korean pronunciation of the same Chinese character (林). A much less common Korean surname Im is derived from another character (任; spelled 임 Im in both North and South Korean) the character used to write the surname Ren. In Korean, the former is called Supul Rim (수풀 림) and the latter Matgil Im (맡길 임) when they need to be distinguished.
- A common Japanese surname, Hayashi, is written with the same character 林 and also means forest. A much rarer Japanese surname, Rin, is also written with same character.
- The Vietnamese surname, "Lâm", was formerly written using the same character.
- In Singapore, although "Lim" and "Lam" are generally more common variants, the extremely rare spelling "Lyn" can be found in select families of Chinese, Japanese, or other East Asian ancestry (also transcribed using the 林 character) and bears no known relation to the English or Scottish surname of the same spelling, or alternate spelling "Ling".
- A rare Chinese surname which is also transcribed Lin is 藺 / 蔺 (pinyin Lìn), for example the Warring States period statesman Lin Xiangru .
- Indonesians of Chinese ancestry bearing this surname sometimes spell it as "Liem", as pronounced in the Fuqing dialect. This surname has also been Indonesianized, turning them into a more Indonesia-sounding surnames with the prefix Lim- (e.g. Limantoro) or suffix -lim (e.g. Halim, Salim)
- Many Thai Chinese families with this surname have adopted indigenized derivatives such as "Limthongkul", "Limjaroenrat", "Limjittrakorn", "Limwattana", "Limraksa", "Limwannasathian", "Sirilim", "Limpisthira", among others.
- The character "霖" (Lín, "heavy rain showers") is also a popular personal name among ethnic Chinese people.

== Notable people surnamed Lin ==
This is an East Asian name, meaning the surname is stated "before" the given name, though East Asian persons living in Western countries will often put their surname after their given name.

=== Lin ===
Mandarin and Wu Chinese form:

- Lin Biao (林彪), military general and former Vice Premier of the People's Republic of China
- Lin Bih-jaw (林碧炤 Lin Bizhao), Secretary-General to the President of the Republic of China (2016)
- Laufey (singer) (林冰 Lín Bīng), Icelandic-Chinese singer
- Lin Bu (林逋), poet
- Lin Chen-yi (林镇夷 Lin Zhenyi), Chief of the General Staff of the Republic of China Armed Forces (2009–2013)
- Lin Cheng-chieh (林正杰 Lín Zhèngjié), Taiwanese politician
- Lin Cheng-chih (林澄枝 Lín Chéngzhī), Taiwanese politician
- Lin Cheng-feng (林正豐 Lín Zhèngfēng), Taiwanese baseball player
- Lin Cheng-fong (林正峰), Taiwanese politician
- Lin Chih-chia (林志嘉 Lin Zhijia), Secretary-General of Legislative Yuan
- Lin Chih-chien (林智堅 Lin Zhijian), Mayor of Hsinchu City
- Lin Chih-sheng (林智盛 Lin Zhisheng), Taiwanese baseball player
- Lin Chi-ling (林志玲 Lin Zhiling), Taiwanese supermodel, actress
- Lin Ching-Liang (林清凉 Lin Qingliang), Taiwanese nuclear physicist
- Lin Chin-tien (林金田 Lin Jintian), Political Deputy Minister of Culture of the Republic of China (2012–2013)
- Lin Chuan (林全 Lin Quan), Premier of the Republic of China (2016–2017)
- Lin Chu-chia (林祖嘉 Lin Zujia), Minister of National Development Council of the Republic of China (2016)
- Lin Dan (林丹), world Olympic champion, men's singles badminton player, People's Republic of China
- Lin Di (林笛), musician, pipa player with Chinese rock band Cold Fairyland
- Lin Fang-yue (林芳郁) Taiwanese cardiologist, hospital superintendent, and health minister (2008)
- Lin Fong-cheng, Vice Chairman of Kuomintang (2007–2014)
- Lin Hejie (Lim Ho Kiat 林贺杰), painter and commentator
- Lin Hwai-min, choreographer and founder of Taiwan's Cloud Gate Dance Theater
- Lin Hsi-shan, Secretary-General of the Legislative Yuan (1999–2016)
- Lin Hsi-yao, Vice Premier of the Republic of China (2016–2017)
- Lin Jeng-yi, Director of National Palace Museum of Taiwan (2016–2018)
- Lin Join-sane, Secretary-General of Kuomintang (2012)
- Lin Jun Jie, Singaporean singer and songwriter
- Lin Junq-tzer, Governor of Taiwan Province (2010–2016)
- Lin Kegong, Taiwanese painter
- Shu Qi (Lin Li-hui 林立慧), Taiwanese actress and model
- Lin Ling-san, Minister of Transportation and Communications (2002–2006)
- Lin Mei-chu, Minister of Labor of the Republic of China (2017–2018)
- Lin Ming-chen, Magistrate of Nantou County
- Lin Neng-pai, Minister of Public Construction Commission of the Republic of China (2000–2002)
- Lin Peng, actress
- Lin Qingfeng (林清峰), world Olympic champion, weightlifter, athlete
- Lin Sang, world Olympic silver medalist, athlete, archer
- Lin San-quei, Vice Minister of Labor of the Republic of China
- Lin Sen, former president, chairman of National Government of China
- Lin Shicheng musician, Shanghai-born pipa player
- Lin Shihong (林士弘), king of Chu dynasty
- Lin Shu-chen, Administrative Deputy Minister of Education of the Republic of China (2013–2016)
- Lin Siyi (林思意), Chinese singer, actress, and member of Chinese idol girl group SNH48
- Lin Teng-chiao, Administrative Deputy Minister of Education of the Republic of China
- Lin Tsung-hsien, Minister of Council of Agriculture of the Republic of China (2017–2018)
- Lin Tzou-yien, Minister of Health and Welfare of the Republic of China (2016–2017)
- Lin Tzu-ling, Administrative Deputy Minister of the Interior of the Republic of China
- Lin Wan-i, Deputy Magistrate of Taipei County (1999–2002)
- Lin Weining (林伟宁), world Olympic champion, weightlifter, athlete
- Lin Wenyue, scholar, writer and translator from Taiwan.
- Lin Xiangru, Chinese politician of the Warring States period
- Lin Xu (林旭), scholar, poet
- Lin Yang-kang, former mayor of Taipei city, Chairman of Taiwan province, Taiwanese politician
- Lin Yanjun, Taiwanese singer and actor, former member of Nine Percent
- Lin Yi (林一), Chinese actor and model
- Lin Yinghai (林英海), Chinese politician
- Lin Yi-shih, Secretary-General of Executive Yuan (2012)
- Lin Yongsheng (林永昇), Chinese admiral
- Lin Youren, musician, Chinese guqin player
- Lin Youyi (林有懿), Hong Kong-born Singaporean television host and actress
- Lin Yuan-lang, Magistrate of Nantou County (1989–1997)
- Lin Yu-chang, Mayor of Keelung City
- Lin Yu-chun Taiwanese singer
- Lin Yue (林跃), world Olympic champion, diver
- Lin Yu-fang, Taiwanese politician
- Lin Yutang, inventor, linguist, writer, Nobel prize nominee
- Lin Zexu, nineteenth-century governor-general, imperial commissioner, poet, scholar, diplomat
- Alfred Lin, Taiwanese-born American venture capitalist
- Ariel Lin (Lin Yi-chen), Taiwanese actress
- Brigitte Lin (林青霞, Lin Ch'ing-hsia), Taiwanese film actress
- Cho-Liang Lin, musician, U.S. Taiwanese violinist, "Instrumentalist of the Year" in 2000
- David Lin (born 1950), Minister of Foreign Affairs of the Republic of China (2012–2016)
- Douglas N. C. Lin, astrophysicist
- Edgar Lin (1938–2025), Taiwanese biologist, ecologist, diplomat and politician
- Estrella Lin (Lin Wei-ling 林韋伶), Taiwanese singer
- Francis Y. Lin, Chinese linguist
- Jenny Lin, musician, pianist
- Jeremy Lin (林書豪, Lin Shu-hao), U.S. basketball player
- Jimmy Lin (林志穎, Lin Chih-ying), Taiwanese film actor and singer
- Justin Lin, U.S. film director
- Justin Yifu Lin, former Chief Economist of the World Bank
- Kelly Lin (林熙蕾), Taiwanese actress, model
- Kevin Lin (林義傑), marathon runner
- Lucia Lin, Political Deputy Minister of Education of the Republic of China (2014–2016)
- Maya Lin, artist and architect
- Ruby Lin (林心如, Lin Xin-ru), Taiwanese actress
- Ryan Lin, ice hockey player
- Tzu-Wei Lin, infielder for the Boston Red Sox
- Yu-Min Lin (born 2003), pitcher in the Arizona Diamondbacks organization

=== Lam ===
Cantonese form:

- Adrian Lam (born 1970), Papua New Guinean professional rugby league coach and former player
- Barry Lam (林百里; born 1949), Taiwanese billionaire businessman, founder & chairman of Quanta Computer
- Bowie Lam (林保怡; born 1965), Hong Kong actor and singer
- Lam Bun (林彬; 1929–1967), radio commentator at Commercial Radio Hong Kong
- Lam Bun-Ching (林品晶; born 1954), Chinese American pianist, composer, conductor
- Carol Lam (林剑华; born 1959), former United States Attorney for the Southern District of California
- Carrie Lam (林鄭月娥; born 1957), Hong Kong retired politician, former Chief Executive of Hong Kong
- Chet Lam (林一峰; born 1976), Hong Kong singer-songwriter
- David Lam (林思齊; 1923–2010), former Lieutenant Governor of British Columbia, Canada
- Derek Lam (born 1967), American fashion designer
- Eman Lam (林二汶; born 1982), Hong Kong singer-songwriter
- George Lam (林子祥; born 1947), Hong Kong singer-songwriter, music producer, actor
- James Lam (born 1961), American author, corporate director, management consultant
- Jhon Rebatta Lam (born 1999), Peruvian-Chinese professional soccer player
- Karen Lam, Canadian film director, writer, producer
- Karen Lam (林小玲), Hong Kong diabetes and obesity researcher
- Karena Lam (林嘉欣; born 1978), Taiwanese Canadian actress and singer
- Karencici Lam (林愷倫; born 1998), Chinese American singer-songwriter
- Lam Kor-wan (林過雲; born 1955), Hong Kong serial killer
- Lam Nhat Tien (born 1971), Vietnamese American singer
- Malone Lam (born 2004), Singaporean-American cybercriminal
- Nixie Lam (林琳; born 1982), Hong Kong politician
- Nora Lam (宋能尔; 1932–2004), Chinese Protestant Christian evangelist, author of "China Cry"
- Pat Lam (born 1968), New Zealand rugby union coach and former player
- Lam Po-chuen (林保全; 1951–2015), Hong Kong voice actor
- Raymond Lam (林峯; born 1979), Hong Kong actor and singer
- Richard Lam (林振強; 1948–2003), Hong Kong lyricist
- Ringo Lam (林嶺東; 1955–2018), Hong Kong film director, producer, screenwriter
- Lam Sai-wing (林世荣; 1861–1943), Chinese Hung Gar martial artist, student of Wong Fei-hung
- Sandy Lam (林憶蓮; born 1966), Hong Kong singer, actress, producer
- Sarah Lam, British-Chinese actress
- Sau-Hai (Harvey) Lam (1931–2018), American theoretical physicist
- Stephen Lam (林瑞麟; born 1955), former Chief Secretary of Hong Kong and Secretary for Constitutional and Mainland Affairs
- Tony Lam (born 1936), American politician
- Wifredo Lam (林飛龍; 1902–1982), Cuban artist
- Willy Wo-Lap Lam (林和立; born 1952), Hong Kong political analyst

=== Lum ===
Alternate Cantonese form:

- Agnes Lum (born 1956), American former model, singer, actress, pop idol in Japan
- Nora Lum, (林家珍; stage name Awkwafina, born 1988), American actress, comedian, rapper
- Olivia Lum (林爱莲), Singaporean businesswoman, group CEO & president of Hyflux Group

=== Lim ===
Southern Min (Hokkien or Teochew) form:

- Lim Ban Lim, Singaporean secret society member and gunman
- Lim Bo Seng, World War II anti-Japanese Resistance fighter based in Singapore and British Malaya
- Lim Boon Heng (林文兴), former Singaporean politician
- Lim Boon Keng, Singaporean national reformist of Peranakan descent
- Lim Chee Onn, former Singaporean minister and politician serving as a chancellor of Singapore Management University
- Lim Cheng Choo (林清注), Bruneian businessman and politician
- Lim Chin Chong, Malaysian male prostitute and convicted killer executed in Singapore
- Lim Chin Siong, cofounder of Singapore's People's Action Party (P.A.P.)
- Lim Chin Tsong (林振宗), Overseas Chinese oil tycoon during British Burma
- Lim Chong Eu (林苍祐), former Malaysian politician known as the "Architect of Modern Penang"
- Lim Giong, Singaporean Taiwanese musician, songwriter and actor
- Lim Goh Tong (林梧桐), Fujianese billionaire and founder of Genting Group
- Lim Guan Eng (林冠英), Malaysian politician, former Chief Minister of Penang (2008–2018) and former Minister of Finance of Malaysia (2018–2020)
- Lim Hng Kiang (林勛強), former Singaporean politician
- Lim Hock Chee (林福星), Singaporean business magnate and founder of Singaporean supermarket chain Sheng Siong
- Lim Hock Soon, Singaporean nightclub owner and murder victim
- Lim Hwee Huang, Singaporean victim of a rape and murder case
- Lim Jock Hoi (林玉辉), Bruneian politician and diplomat
- Lim Jock Seng (林玉成), Bruneian politician and diplomat
- Lim Kim Huat, Malaysian gunman executed in Singapore
- Lim Kim San (林金山), Singaporean politician noted for contributions to public housing policy
- Lim Kit Siang (林吉祥), Malaysian politician, longest serving Leader of the Opposition in Malaysia, known as Mr. Opposition
- Lim Kok Yew, Malaysian gunman executed in Singapore
- Lim Koon Teck, first person of East Asian descent to be appointed to the British Colonial Legal Service during the twentieth century
- Lim Lye Hock, Singaporean rapist and killer
- Lim Nee Soon, prominent Singapore pioneer and community leader, rubber magnate and banker
- Norman Kwong (Lim Kwong Yew), former professional athlete and Lieutenant Governor of Alberta, Canada
- Lim Por-yen (林百欣), Hong Kong industrialist
- Lim Shiow Rong (林秀蓉 Lín Xiùróng), Singaporean and victim of an unsolved child rape and murder case
- Lim Teck Hoo (林德浦), Bruneian businessman and philanthropist
- Lim Tze Peng (林子平), Singaporean painter
- Lim Yew Hock, second Chief Minister of Singapore
- Abraham Lim (actor), American actor and singer
- Adrian Lim (林宝龙), Singaporean medium and notorious child killer
- Alberto Lim, Filipino secretary of Tourism
- Alfredo Lim, Filipino mayor of Manila
- Anderson Lim (林志伟), Bruneian swimmer
- Catherine Lim, Malaysian-born Singaporean author
- Cherie Nursalim (林美金), Indonesian businesswoman
- Danilo Lim, Filipino chairman of MMDA and soldier
- Desiree Lim, Malaysian-born Canadian independent film director, producer, and screenwriter
- Dion Lim, American news anchor and reporter
- Freddy Lim, Taiwanese musician and lead singer of Taiwanese metal band Chthonic
- Jennifer Lim, British actress
- Joe Taslim (林科燈), Indonesian actor, martial artist, and model
- Ken Lim, Singaporean record producer and composer
- Kelvin Lim Hock Hin, Singaporean convicted sex offender
- Kevin Lim, Indonesian singer and songwriter
- Lee Hong Susan Lim, Malaysian parasitologist (1952–2014)
- Mikha Lim, Filipino rapper, dancer, singer, actress and member of girl group BINI
- Moses Lim, T.V. and movie actor (e.g. "Just Follow Law"), food gourmet and entrepreneur from Singapore
- Peter Lim, Singaporean billionaire
- Phillip Lim, U.S. fashion designer
- Pik-Sen Lim (林碧笙), Malay-British actress
- Rebecca Lim (林慧玲) (born 1986), Singaporean actress
- Reno Lim, Filipino politician
- Ron Lim, U.S. comic book artist
- Roseller T. Lim, Filipino politician mostly as senator and house representative
- Shin Lim (林良尋) (born 1991), American-Canadian stage magician
- Sofjan Wanandi (林綿坤), Indonesian businessman
- Sylvia Lim (林瑞莲), Singaporean lawyer and politician
- Tan Sri Lim Kok Thay, chairman and C.E.O. of Genting Berhad conglomerate
- Tiger Lim, Bruneian blogger
- Vicente Lim, Filipino brigadier general and WW2 hero
- Wendell Lim, Professor at University of California, San Francisco and director of SynBERC
- Xixi Lim, Singaporean comedian, influencer, actor, host and model
- Sondhi Limthongkul (林明達), Thai journalist, founder and owner of Manager Daily and political activist
- Pita Limjaroenrat Pita Limjaroenrat (Thai: พิธา ลิ้มเจริญรัตน์, RTGS: Phitha Limcharoenrat, pronounced [pʰí(ʔ).tʰāː lím.tɕā.rɤ̄ːn.rát]; nicknamed Tim; born 5 September 1980) is a Thai politician and businessman. He is the leader of the Move Forward Party, the de facto successor to the dissolved Future Forward Party.

=== Liem ===
Indonesian form:

- John Beng Kiat Liem (1922–2001), Indonesian member of the Asia-Pacific Scout Committee
- Liem Boen Kwang (林文光; Alim Markus), Indonesian businessman, founder and owner of Maspion
- Liem Bwan Tjie (1891–1966), Indonesian architect
- Liem Jah Kian (林益建; Bachtiar Karim), Indonesian businessman
- Liem Koen Hian (林群贤; 1897–1952), Indonesian journalist and politician
- Liem Oen Kian (林文鏡; Sutanto Djuhar), Indonesian businessman
- Liem Seeng Tee (林生地, 1893–1956), founder of PT HM Sampoerna Tbk., one of the largest Indonesian tobacco companies
- Liem Sioe Liong (林绍良; Sudono Salim; 1916–2012), Indonesian tycoon, founder of Salim Group
- Liem Swie King (林水鏡; born 1956), Indonesian former badminton player
- Liem Tien Pao (Putera Sampoerna; born 1947), Indonesian businessman
- Liem Tjoan Hok (林廉鹤; Teguh Karya; 1937–2001), Indonesian film director
- Liem Wong Siu (林王小; Djoni Liem), chief warrant officer of the Indonesian Marine Corps
- Koko Liem (Muhammad Utsman Ansori; Liem Hai Thai), Indonesian Islamic preacher

=== Ling ===
Eastern Min, Northern Min, and Wu form:

- Ling How Doong (林孝谆, 1934–2021), Singaporean politician and lawyer
- Ling Liong Sik (林良实, 1943–2026), the sixth president of the Malaysian Chinese Association (MCA)
- Jahja Ling (林望傑, born 1951), Indonesian American conductor, music director, pianist
- Alan Ling Sie Kiong (林思健, born 1983), Malaysian lawyer
- Ling Tian Soon (林添顺), Malaysian politician
- John Wey Ling (林建伟, born 1958 or 1959), Chinese-born American ballet dancer
- Julia Ling (林小微, born 1983), American television actress
- Landon Ling (林家亮, born 1987), Canadian football player
- Oscar Ling Chai Yew (林财耀, born 1977), Malaysian politician
- Robert Ling Kui Ee (林桂億), Malaysian politician
- Tschen La Ling (林球立, born 1956), Dutch football player
- Victor Ling (林重慶, born 1943), Chinese-born Canadian scientist

=== Leng ===
- Leng Chau Yen (林朝雁, born 1984), Malaysian politician

== See also ==
- Linn (surname)
- Lyn (surname)
- Lam (disambiguation), variant of Chinese Lin
- List of common Chinese surnames
- List of common Asian surnames
