= Hayashi =

- Pronunciation: [ha̠ja̠ɕi]

Origin
- Origin: Japanese
- Meaning: woods
- Region of origin: Japan

Other names
- Variant forms: Kobayashi; Lin; Im

Hayashi (林, literally "woods"), is the 19th most common Japanese surname. It shares the same character as the Chinese surname Lin and the Korean surname Im.

== Notable people with the surname ==
- Aiko Hayashi (林 愛子; born 1993), Japanese synchronized swimmer
- Akihiro Hayashi (林 彰洋; born 1987), Japanese footballer
- Hayashi Akira (林 韑; 1800–1859), Japanese scholar and diplomat
- Akira Hayashi (swimmer) (林 享; born 1974), Japanese swimmer
- Asuca Hayashi (林 明日香; born 1989), Japanese singer
- Cheryl Hayashi, American biologist
- Chiaki Hayashi (林 千晶), Japanese businesswoman
- Chujiro Hayashi (林 忠次郎; 1880–1940), Japanese naval surgeon and Reiki practitioner
- Chushiro Hayashi (林 忠四郎; 1920–2010), Japanese astrophysicist
- Coco Hayashi (林 鼓子; born 2002), Japanese voice actress
- Daichi Hayashi (林 大地; born 1997), Japanese footballer
- Eigen Hayashi (林 英源; born 1949), Japanese sport shooter
- Eitetsu Hayashi (林 英哲; born 1952), Japanese musician
- Erina Hayashi (林 恵里奈; born 1994), Japanese tennis player
- Fubō Hayashi (林 不忘), pen name of Kaitarō Hasegawa (1900–1935), Japanese writer
- Fumiko Hayashi (author) (林 芙美子; 1903 or 1904 – 1951), Japanese writer and poet
- Fumiko Hayashi (politician) (林 文子; born 1946), Japanese politician
- Fumino Hayashi (林 ふみの), Japanese manga artist
- Fumio Hayashi (林 文夫; born 1952), Japanese economist
- Fumio Hayashi (doctor) (林 文雄; 1900–1947), Japanese physician
- Fusao Hayashi (林 房雄; 1903–1975), pen name of Toshio Gotō, Japanese writer
- Hayashi Gahō (林 鵞峰; 1618–1688), Japanese neo-Confucian philosopher and writer
- Hayashi Gakusai (林 学斎; 1833–1906), Japanese neo-Confucian philosopher
- Hayashi Gonsuke (diplomat) (林 権助; 1860–1939), Japanese diplomat
- Harvey Saburo Hayashi (林 三郎; 1867–1943), Japanese physician
- Hidekazu Hayashi (林 秀一; born 1965), Japanese rower
- Hayashi Hidesada (林 秀貞; died 1580), Japanese samurai
- Hikaru Hayashi (林 光; 1931–2012), Japanese classical composer, pianist and conductor
- Hirofumi Hayashi (林 博史; born 1955), Japanese historian
- Hiroki Hayashi (林 宏樹), Japanese animator
- Hiroko Hayashi (林 寛子; 1933–2023), better known as Chikage Oogi, Japanese actress and politician
- Hiroko Hayashi (singer) (林 寛子; born 1959), Japanese singer, actress and television personality
- Hiromori Hayashi (林 廣守; 1831–1896), Japanese composer
- Hiroyuki Hayashi (athlete) (林 弘幸; born 1973), Japanese sprinter
- Hiroyuki Hayashi (footballer) (林 祐征; born 1983), Japanese footballer
- Hiroyuki Hayashi (musician) (ハヤシ ヒロユキ; born 1978), Japanese musician
- Hisao Hayashi (林 寿夫; 1881–1963), Japanese government official
- Hayashi Hōkō (林 鳳岡; 1644–1732), Japanese neo-Confucian scholar, teacher and administrator
- Honoka Hayashi (林 穂之香; born 1998), Japanese women's footballer
- Ikuo Hayashi (林 郁夫; born 1947), member of Aum Shinrikyo
- Isao Hayashi (林 伊佐緒; 1912–1995), Japanese singer and composer
- Izuo Hayashi (林 厳雄; 1922–2005), Japanese physicist
- Joe Hayashi (1920–1945), United States Army soldier and Medal of Honor recipient
- Jun Hayashi (林 潤; born 1972), Japanese politician
- Hayashi Jussai (林 述斎; 1768–1841), Japanese neo-Confucian scholar
- Kaizo Hayashi (林 海象; born 1957), Japanese film director and screenwriter
- Kanna Hayashi, American academic
- Kazuaki Hayashi (林 一章; born 1976), Japanese footballer and manager
- Kazuhiro Hayashi (林 和広; born 1973), better known as Kaz Hayashi, Japanese professional wrestler
- Kazuo Hayashi (林 一夫; born 1945), Japanese actor and voice actor
- Keiichi Hayashi (林 景一; born 1951), Japanese diplomat
- Keisuke Hayashi (林 佳祐; born 1988), Japanese footballer
- Keizō Hayashi (林 敬三; 1907–1991), Japanese civil servant and general officer
- Kenta Hayashi (林 健太; born 1994), Japanese kickboxer
- Kentaro Hayashi (林 健太郎; born 1972), Japanese football player
- Kento Hayashi (林 遣都; born 1990), Japanese actor
- Kim Hayashi (born 1986), American cyclist
- Kiralee Hayashi, American stunt woman, actress and gymnast
- Kohei Hayashi (林 晃平; born 1978), Japanese footballer
- Kotona Hayashi (林 琴奈; born 1999), Japanese volleyball player
- Kumiko Hayashi (林 久美子; born 1972), Japanese politician
- Kyoko Hayashi (林 京子; 1930–2017), Japanese writer
- Marc Hayashi (born 1957), American actor
- Marika Hayashi (林 真里花; born 1975), Japanese actress and voice actress
- Mariko Hayashi (林 真理子; born 1954), Japanese writer
- Masako Hayashi (林 雅子; 1928–2001), Japanese architect
- Mary Hayashi, American politician
- Masamichi Hayashi (林 誠道; born 1996), Japanese footballer
- Masanori Hayashi (林 昌範; born 1983), Japanese baseball player
- Masumi Hayashi (murderer) (林 眞須美; born 1961), Japanese murderer
- Masumi Hayashi (photographer) (1945–2006), American photographer and artist
- Mizuki Hayashi (林 瑞輝; born 1996), Japanese footballer
- Moritaka Hayashi, Japanese lawyer
- Motoo Hayashi (林 幹雄; born 1947), Japanese politician
- Nagisa Hayashi (林 なぎさ; born 1986), Japanese field hockey player
- Hayashi Narinaga (林 就長; 1517–1605), Japanese samurai
- Nobu Hayashi (林 伸樹; born 1978), Japanese karateka and kickboxer
- Hayashi Ōen (林 桜園; 1797–1870), Japanese physician, military strategist, scholar, Shinto priest, diviner, and nationalist
- Okagi Hayashi (林 おかぎ, 1909–2025), Japanese supercentenarian
- Osamu Hayashi (林 修; born 1965), Japanese television personality
- Patrick Hayashi, the defendant in the property law case Popov v. Hayashi
- Hayashi Razan (林 羅山; 1583–1657), Japanese neo-Confucian philosopher and writer
- Ryan Hayashi (born 1973), Canadian magician
- Ryohei Hayashi (林 陵平; born 1986), Japanese footballer
- Hayashi Ryūkō (林 榴岡; 1681–1758), Japanese neo-Confucian scholar, teacher and administrator
- Ryuta Hayashi (林 隆太; born 1990), Japanese footballer
- Saki Hayashi (林 咲希; born 1995), Japanese women's basketball player
- Satoru Hayashi (林 慧; born 1988), Japanese footballer
- Saya Hayashi ( 林 沙耶, born 1999), Japanese actress, singer, model, and radio personality known professionally as Rikka Ihara (伊原 六花)
- Scott B. Hayashi (born 1953), American Episcopal bishop
- Senjūrō Hayashi (林 銑十郎; 1876–1943), Japanese general, politician and Prime Minister of Japan
- Shigeo Hayashi (林 重男; 1918–2002), Japanese photographer
- Hayashi Shihei (林 子平; 1738-1793), Japanese military scholar
- Hayashi Shiryu, Japanese swordsman
- Shizuya Hayashi, Japanese-American World War II soldier
- Shōji Hayashi (林 昌二; 1928–2011), Japanese architect
- Shūji Hayashi (林 修司; born 1979), Japanese actor
- Tadaaki Hayashi (林 忠明), Japanese table tennis player
- Tadahiko Hayashi (林 忠彦; 1918–1990), Japanese photographer
- Tadamasa Hayashi (林 忠正; 1853–1906), Japanese art dealer
- Tadashi Hayashi (林 正; born 1962), Japanese basketball coach
- Hayashi Tadasu (林 董; 1850–1913), Japanese diplomat
- Hayashi Tadataka (林 忠崇; 1848–1941), Japanese daimyō
- Tadayoshi Hayashi (林 忠義; born 1968), Japanese equestrian
- Takanobu Hayashi (林 隆喜; born 1946), Japanese photographer
- Takehiro Hayashi (林 威宏; born 1976), Japanese footballer
- Takenori Hayashi (林 丈統; born 1980), Japanese footballer
- Takuto Hayashi (林 卓人; born 1982), Japanese footballer
- Teru Hayashi (1914–2003), Japanese-American biologist
- Tetsuji Hayashi (林哲司, born 1949), Japanese composer
- Tomomi Hayashi (林 知充; born 1971), Japanese-Estonian architect
- Tomoya Hayashi (林 友哉; born 1999), Japanese footballer
- Toshiko Hayashi (1940–2022), Japanese communist politician
- Toshiyuki Hayashi (林 敏之; born 1960), Japanese rugby union player
- Tsuruichi Hayashi (林 鶴一; 1873–1935), Japanese mathematician
- Tsuyoshi Hayashi (林 剛史; born 1982), Japanese actor
- Hayashi Utako (林 歌子; 1865–1946), Japanese educator and social worker
- Yasuo Hayashi (林 泰男; 1957–2018), one of the perpetrators of the 1995 Sarin gas attack on the Tokyo subway
- Yasunori Hayashi (林 康紀; born 1965), Japanese neuroscientist
- Hayashi Yasusada (林 権助; 1806–1868), Japanese samurai
- Yohei Hayashi (林 容平; born 1989), Japanese footballer
- Yoichi Hayashi (林 与一; born 1942), Japanese actor
- Yoko Hayashi (林 陽子; born 1956), Japanese lawyer
- Yoshihide Hayashi (林 義秀; 1891–1978), Japanese general
- Yoshiki Hayashi (林 佳樹; born 1965), better known as Yoshiki, Japanese musician, songwriter, composer and record producer
- Yoshimasa Hayashi (林 芳正; born 1961), Japanese politician
- Yoshimi Hayashi (1923–2006), American lawyer
- Yoshiro Hayashi (golfer) (林 由郎; 1922–2012), Japanese golfer
- Yoshiro Hayashi (politician) (林 義郎; 1927–2017), Japanese politician
- Yū Hayashi (林 勇; born 1983), Japanese voice actor and singer
- Yuichiro Hayashi (林 祐一郎), Japanese director
- Yuki Hayashi (archer) (林 勇気; born 1984), Japanese archer
- Yuki Hayashi (composer) (林 ゆうき; born 1980), Japanese composer and arranger
- Yukina Hayashi (林 有紀奈; born 1996), Japanese volleyball player
- Yumika Hayashi (林 由美香; 1970–2005), Japanese AV idol and actress
- Yusuke Hayashi (林 勇介; born 1990), Japanese footballer
- Hayashi Yūzō (林 有造; 1842–1921), Japanese politician

== See also ==
- 林 (disambiguation)
