= 林 =

林 is an East Asian character for a word or morpheme that means forest or woods.

It may refer to:

- Hayashi, a common Japanese surname
- Im (Korean name) or Lim, a common Korean surname
- Lin (surname), the pinyin transliteration of a common Chinese surname
- Lam, Lem, Lim, and Lum (surname) a common Chinese surname in China, Southeast Asia, and among overseas Chinese
