= Lucia Lin =

Taiwanese scholar and politician

Lin Shih-Ling
- 林思伶

President of Providence University
- Incumbent
- Assumed office August 1, 2022

Political Deputy Minister of Education of the Republic of China
- In office 16 August 2014 – 20 May 2016
- Minister: Wu Se-hwa
- Administrative Deputy: Lin Shu-chen
- Preceded by: Chen Der-hwa

Personal details
- Education: National Taiwan University (BA, MA); Harvard University (MEd); Florida State University (PhD)

Lin Shih-Ling (Chinese: 林思伶; pinyin: Lín Sīlíng), also known by her English name Lucia Lin, is a Taiwanese academic administrator. She was the Political Deputy Minister of Education from August 2014 until May 2016.

== Education ==
Lin graduated from National Taiwan University with a Bachelor of Arts (B.A.) in 1986 and a Master of Arts (M.A.) in 1989, both in political science. She then completed graduate studies in the United States at Harvard University, where she earned a Master of Education (M.Ed.) from the Harvard Graduate School of Education in 1990. In 1992, Lin earned her Ph.D. in instructional design from Florida State University. Her doctoral advisor was distinguished professor Robert Morgan.

== Career ==
Lin has held several positions in Fu Jen Catholic University, such as chair of the Graduate Institute of Education Leadership and Development from 2000 to 2005, vice president of Administrative Affairs from 2006 to 2008, dean of the College of Education in 2011 and vice president of Academic Affairs from 2008 to 2012. She was the president of Wenzao Ursuline University of Languages from 2013 to 2014.

On August 1, 2022, Lin became the president of Providence University.
