= Moritaka =

- Gender: Male

Origin
- Origin: Japanese
- Meaning: Different meanings depending on the kanji used

Moritaka (written: 盛隆 or 守隆) is a masculine Japanese given name. Notable people with the name include:

- Ashina Moritaka (蘆名 盛隆) (1561–1584), Japanese samurai and daimyō
- Moritaka Hayashi, Japanese lawyer
- Kuki Moritaka (九鬼 守隆) (1573–1632), Japanese samurai

Moritaka (written: 森高) is also a Japanese surname. Notable people with the surname include:

- Ai Moritaka (森高 愛; born 1990), Japanese model and actress
- Chisato Moritaka (森高 千里; born 1969), Japanese singer-songwriter
