= Chao Chan-ao =

Taiwanese painter

Chan-Ao Chao
- Born: Chao Ao; July 3, 1932; Laiyang County, Shandong, China (present-day Laixi)
- Died: August 17, 2019 (aged 87); Kaohsiung, Taiwan
- Education: Fu Hsing Kang College, Department of Fine Arts
- Known for: Ink wash painting, Oil painting
- Notable work: Shan Hou Qi Guan (山后奇觀), Landscape (山水), Cold Mountain, Depths Unknown (寒山雲深不知處), Sound of Ink at Play (墨戲清音)
- Movement: Modern ink wash painting

Chao Chan-ao (Chinese: 趙占鰲; 3 July 1932 – 17 August 2019), born Chao Ao (趙鰲), was a Taiwanese painter who worked in both ink wash painting and oil painting. His works are held in the permanent collections of the National Taiwan Museum of Fine Arts, the Kaohsiung Museum of Fine Arts, and the Taipei Fine Arts Museum.

== Life ==
Chao was born on 3 July 1932 in Laiyang County, Shandong Province (present-day Laixi). Displaced by war, he joined the military in 1947 and travelled via Hainan and Hong Kong to Kaohsiung, settling permanently in Taiwan in 1950. After arriving in Taiwan, he attended night school with military support and obtained a senior-high-school-equivalent qualification. In 1958 he was admitted to the fine arts department of Fu Hsing Kang College (today's National Defense University College of Political Warfare), where he trained in oil painting and studied under the painter Lin Kegong (1901–1992).

In 1961 he won first prize in the oil painting category of a youth painting competition organized by the International Women's Association. In 1962 his oil painting Beitou Fengguang (〈北投風光〉) was selected for the São Paulo Youth Art Exhibition in Brazil; that same year he graduated from Fu Hsing Kang College with the top practical-skills score and stayed on as a teaching assistant.

From September 1963 to 1974, Chao lived in Hengchun, teaching at Hengchun Junior High School. Being geographically distant from the art circles then concentrated in Taipei allowed his creative path to develop relatively independently of the central discourse of the contemporary modern ink wash movement.

In 1973, Chao began experimenting with modern ink wash painting after working primarily in oils; in 1983 he joined the Xinxiang Painting Society; in 1985 he held his first solo exhibition of modern ink wash work, and went on to hold a total of fifteen solo exhibitions and take part in numerous major domestic and international ink wash group exhibitions. He retired from Fu Hsing Kang College in 1985.

Chao served as a judge for the Kaohsiung Museum of Fine Arts. In his later years, despite illness, he continued to create, publishing a photography collection titled Chan-Ao Chao Photography — Neither Colour Nor Ink, The Story of Old Trees (《趙占鰲攝影——非彩非墨，老樹的故事》), and left behind approximately two to three hundred small-format works (34 × 34 cm) on subjects such as lotus flowers, the sun and moon, landscapes, and plum blossoms. He died in Kaohsiung on 17 August 2019, at the age of 87.

Chao's work was profiled repeatedly in Taiwan's two longest-running art periodicals, Artist (《藝術家》) and Artco (《典藏今藝術》): critic Jiao Shitai wrote a seven-page feature on his ink painting in 1988, and in March 2006 Artist devoted a three-essay special feature to him, with contributions from Jiao, Fu Mengli, and Lei Rizhao.

== Artistic style ==
In his ink wash work, Chao paid close attention to the interplay between brush, paper, and ink, and experimented extensively with materials: he added chemical agents to ink to alter its properties, including a highly volatile soap powder that made the ink "move across the paper like a dragon or snake"; he also dripped chemically treated ink onto the picture surface to create gradient dots resembling faint halos.

The ink painter Jiang Yihan, writing in 1980, observed that Chao brought his grounding in oil painting into ink wash work, breaking from traditional cun brush techniques to develop his own personal "pattern", moving beyond the traditional colour range of Chinese painting, and using partial views to represent the whole, producing a clean, open, and expansive pictorial effect.

In 2004, the art historian Hsiao Chong-ray compiled A Survey of Modern Taiwanese Art: Abstract Lyrical Ink Painting (《台灣現代美術大系──水墨類・抽象抒情水墨》), published by the Council for Cultural Affairs, in which Chao was selected alongside Liu Guosong (who led the group), Li Chongchong, and nine other artists. The book described Chao's abstract ink work as displaying "a strong personal style from the very first stroke," with brushwork carrying "a stark, solitary imagery that stands firm."

In his later years, Chao brought the techniques and spirit of ink painting back into oil painting, depicting landscapes in oil using Chinese brush sensibility and a limited, near-monochrome palette to evoke the visual effect of ink wash painting, producing a personal style at the intersection of Eastern and Western media and concepts. His oil paintings can be broadly divided into four subject categories: landscape scenes, snow-covered mountain forests, towns and buildings, and animals and flowers.

== Collections ==
Chao's work is represented in the permanent collections of three public art museums in Taiwan:

- Shan Hou Qi Guan (山后奇觀, ink, 1991), collection of the National Taiwan Museum of Fine Arts, acquired 1994, accession no. 08300068.
- Landscape (山水, ink), Cold Mountain, Depths Unknown (寒山雲深不知處, oil), and Sound of Ink at Play (墨戲清音, ink), collection of the Kaohsiung Museum of Fine Arts.
- The Taipei Fine Arts Museum also holds works by Chao.
