= Kegong =

Kegong may refer to:

- Gao Kegong (1248–1310), a Chinese painter and poet, born during the Yuan dynasty
- Li Kegong (李克恭; died 890), a younger brother of Li Keyong
- Lin Kegong (1901–1992), a Taiwanese modern artist

== See also ==
- Science and Technology Museum railway station (Chinese: 科工館車站; pinyin: Kēgōngguǎn Chēzhàn), a railway station in Sanmin District, Kaohsiung, Taiwan
