= Hayashi (disambiguation) =

Hayashi is a Japanese surname.

Hayashi may also refer to:

- Hayashi clan (Owari) of Owari Province (a branch of the Inaba clan)
- Hayashi clan (Confucian scholars) of Confucian scholars (founded by Hayashi Razan, came to prominence in the early Edo period, scholarly advisors to Tokugawa Ieyasu)
- Hayashi clan (Jōzai) of the Jōzai Domain (descended from the Ogasawara clan)
- Hayashi house, the name of one of the four Go houses in the Edo period
- Hayashi (music), the term for a musical accompanist section, usually consisting primarily of percussion, in traditional Japanese theatre and dance.
- 4771 Hayashi, a main-belt asteroid
- Hayashi track, a luminosity-temperature relationship seen in young stars
- Hayashi rice, a dish consisting of stewed beef and onions in gravy
