= Huang Pi-twan =

Taiwanese academic (born 1945)

- 黃碧端

Political Deputy Minister of Education of the Republic of China
- In office 2013–2014
- Minister: Wu Se-hwa; Chiang Wei-ling
- Administrative Deputy: Chen Der-hwa; Lin Shu-chen

Minister of the Council for Cultural Affairs of the Republic of China
- In office 20 May 2008 – 15 November 2009
- Deputy: Chang Yui-tan
- Preceded by: Wang Tuoh
- Succeeded by: Emile Sheng

Personal details
- Born: 14 November 1945 (age 80) Hui'an, Fujian
- Education: National Taiwan University (BA, MA); University of Wisconsin-Madison (PhD)

Huang Pi-twan (Chinese: 黃碧端; pinyin: Huáng Bìduān; born 14 November 1945) is a Taiwanese academic and literary scholar. She was the political deputy minister of the Ministry of Education from 2013 to 2014. Previously, she had served as minister of the Council for Cultural Affairs between 2008 and 2009.

== Education ==
Huang graduated from National Taiwan University with a bachelor's degree in political science in 1968 and a master's degree in political science in 1971. She then completed doctoral studies in the United States, where she earned her Ph.D. in literature from the University of Wisconsin–Madison in 1980. Her doctoral dissertation, completed under professor Joseph S. M. Lau, was titled, "Utopian imagination in traditional Chinese fiction".

== Academic career ==
After completing graduate school, Huang returned to Taiwan to become an associate professor and then chairperson at the Department of Foreign Languages and Literature of National Sun Yat-sen University in Kaohsiung City from 1980 to 1992. From 1992 to 1995, she was the deputy director of National Chiang Kai-shek Cultural Center in Taipei City. From 1995 to 1997, she served as the chairperson of the Department of Foreign Languages and Literature of National Chi Nan University (NCNU) in Nantou County. From 1997 to 2000, she headed the Department of Higher Education of the Ministry of Education. In 2000, she became the dean of the College of Humanities of NCNU. Huang served a six-year term as president of Tainan National University of the Arts in Tainan County from 2000 to 2006. From 2006 to 2007, she was a department chair Shih Chien University in Taipei City. After a promotion to Political Deputy Minister for 2013–2014, Huang left the Ministry of Education and was named the leader of PEN International's Taipei Chinese Center.
