= Krairiksh family =

Krairiksh ไกรฤกษ์
- Parent family: Lin family
- Current region: Bangkok
- Origin: Ayutthaya
- Founded: Ayutthaya period
- Founder: Phraya Kraikosa
- Connected families: House of Chakri; House of Sucharitakul; Amatayakul family Panyarachun family
- Estate: Thip Villa

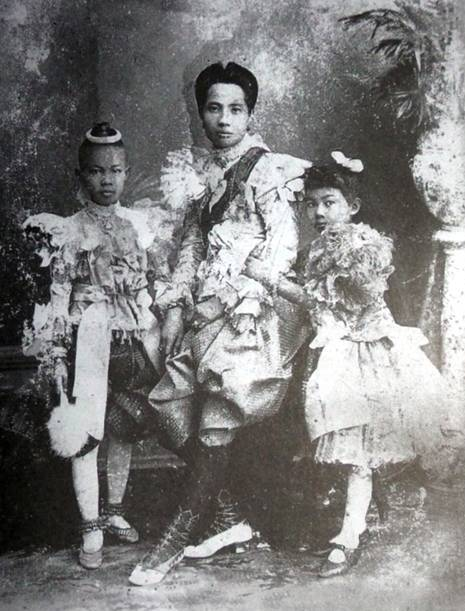
Chum Krairiksh and her daughters

The Krairiksh family (Thai: ไกรฤกษ์, RTGS: Krairoek, pronounced [krāj.rɤ̂ːk]) is a Thai family of Chinese descent which traces its ancestry to Phraya Kraikosa (born Roek Sae-Lim), a Hokkien Chinese born to immigrant parents who became Krommatha (lord of the Harbour Department) under King Taksin. The family name was bestowed by King Vajiravudh in 1913. Many of the descendants of the Krairiksh family occupy key positions at the bureaucracy, finance, the professions and academia.
