= Chiang Wei-ling =

Taiwanese civil engineer and academic

- 蔣偉寧
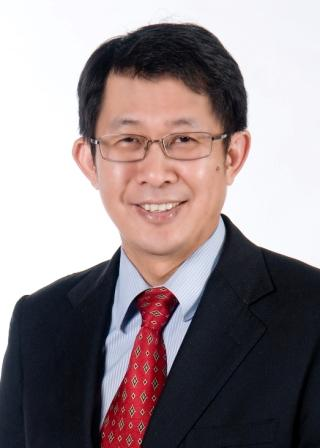

25th Minister of Education of the Republic of China
- In office 6 February 2012 – 14 July 2014
- Political Deputy: Huang Pi-twan, Chen I-hsing; Huang Pi-twan, Chen Der-hwa
- Administrative Deputy: Chen Der-hwa; Lin Shu-chen
- Preceded by: Wu Ching-ji
- Succeeded by: Chen Der-hwa (acting); Wu Se-hwa

Personal details
- Born: 2 September 1957 (age 68) Taiwan
- Education: National Taiwan University (BS); Stanford University (MS, PhD)
- Scientific career
- Fields: Civil engineering
- Thesis: Models for uncertainty propagation-applications to structural and earthquake engineering (1988)
- Doctoral advisor: Haresh C. Shah; Helmut Krawinkler

Chiang Wei-ling (traditional Chinese: 蔣偉寧; simplified Chinese: 蒋伟宁; pinyin: Jiǎng Wěiníng; born 2 September 1957) is a Taiwanese civil engineer and academic. He was the Minister of the Ministry of Education (MOE) of the Executive Yuan in 2012–2014. He is also the former President of National Central University in Taoyuan.

== Education ==
After graduating from Taipei Municipal Fuxing Senior High School, Chiang graduated from National Taiwan University with a Bachelor of Science (B.S.) in civil engineering in 1979. He then completed graduate studies in the United States at Stanford University, where he earned a Master of Science (M.S.) in 1982 and his Ph.D. in civil engineering in 1988. His doctoral dissertation was titled, "Models for uncertainty propagation-applications to structural and earthquake engineering," and was supervised by professors Haresh C. Shah and Helmut Krawinkler.

== ROC Education Ministry ==
=== Taiwan-run education centers in Vietnam closure ===
In February 2013, three Taiwan-run education centers in Vietnam specializing in teaching and teacher training on Chinese language were closed down due to financial difficulties. Initially they tried to share the cost between MOE and local institutions. However, the institution decided that the operation of these education centers were not cost-effective. However, in April 2013 Chiang reiterated ROC government continuing commitment in promoting Chinese language education overseas. Even the MOE official stationed in Vietnam said that if there is any institution interested in running the education centers, they can seek help from the ministry.

=== Retirement limit ===
In early May 2013, Chiang said that he will continue to push on a proposal for a limit on pension for retired public school teachers who still continue teaching at private school after his proposal was recently turned down by the Executive Yuan, in which the cabinet is in favor of having equal treatment for retired teachers, military personnel and civil servants. The proposal planned by Chiang will include a package of government reforms aimed at improving Taiwan's retirement insurance system for retired teachers, military personnel and civil servants, in which the current operating system is not sustainable enough for long term due to low contributions and high replacement rate.

=== Shoeing towards President Ma Ying-jeou ===
In end of October 2013, in response to the growing number of shoeing towards President Ma Ying-jeou, Chiang said that college students who want to express their views should do in a rational way instead of resorting to the inappropriate act of throwing shoes at leaders of government. They have the right to express their opinions about the government, but they should not throw shoes at anyone. Chiang added that people should treat each other with respect and engage in rational communication in order not to create a negative impact on Taiwan's democratic development.

=== National curriculum revision ===
In early 2014, the Ministry of Education proposed the revision of high school curriculum to be more China-centrist. Among the changes are to use the term Mainland China instead of China in referring to Mainland China, learn about Zheng Cheng-gong as Ming Dynasty ruler in Taiwan, the Dutch and Spaniard merely entered Taiwan instead of ruling it etc. Chiang said that everything is inline with the constitution of the Republic of China under the Act Governing Relations between the People of the Taiwan Area and the Mainland Area. As of February 2014, the policy has been passed and would be implemented in the next school year.

=== Resignation ===
On 14 July 2014, Chiang tendered his resignation to Premier Jiang Yi-huah over an alleged academic fraud. He then would return to his teaching position at National Central University.
