= Im (surname) =

Korean family name (임)

Lim, Yim, or Im (林)
- Pronunciation: [im] or [ɾim]
- Language: Korean

Origin
- Language: Chinese
- Meaning: forest
- Region of origin: North and South Korea

Other names
- Variant forms: Lâm; Lin; Hayashi

Yim or Im (任)
- Pronunciation: [im]
- Language: Korean

Origin
- Meaning: dependable, allow, appoint
- Region of origin: North and South Korea

- Im
- Hangul: 임
- Hanja: 任; 林
- RR: Im
- MR: Im

Im or Lim (Korean: 임) is a common Korean family name. The surname is identical to the Chinese character of the same name. (Note: Sino-Korean vocabulary.) According to the initial law of the Korean language, both "Im" and "Lim" are interchangeable.

== History ==
The first clan branch is the Supul Rim (수풀 림, meaning "Forest-Rim") and its Hanja character is 林. The Supul Rim or Lim or Im branch consists of two large clan houses; the first is Naju (early Hoijin) and the second, which is the elder branch, is Pyeongtaek. Members of this branch often write their names as both 임 (Im; more common) and 림 (Rim or Lim; initial law). The character 林 means "forest".

The second clan branch is the Matgil Im (맡길 임) or Mateul Im (맡을 임) and its Hanja character is 任. The Matgil Im/Mateul Im branch consists of one large clan house called Pungcheon Im clan and a smaller clan house called Jangheung (장흥). Members of this clan branch both write and pronounce their names as 임 (Im). The character 任 means "trusted/to bear, duty".

== Romanization ==
When 林 (림 or 임) is romanized, it is spelled as "Rim" or "Im" in McCune–Reischauer and Revised Romanization of Korean, as "Lim".

When 任 (임) is romanized, it is spelled as "Im" both in McCune–Reischauer and Revised Romanization of Korean, or sometimes spelled "Yim".

Statistics from the year 2000 show that there were 762,767 수풀 림 (林, Rim) and 172,726 맡길 임 (任, Im) in South Korea.

== Historical people ==
The following is a list of notable people of the past with the Korean family name Im/Lim/Rim.

- Im Sa-hong (1445–1506), Korean scholar official
- Im Kkeokjeong (1521–1562), leader of the Hwanghae peasant rebellion
- Im Che (1549–1587), Korean Confucianist nobleman
- Im Gyeong-eop (1594–1646), Korean general
- Im Yunjidang (1721–1793), Korean writer and neo-Confucian philosopher
- Im Sang-ok (1779–1885), Korean trader

== Modern people ==
- I.M (born Im Chang-kyun, 1996), South Korean rapper, member of boy band Monsta X
- Im Chang-jung (born 1973), South Korean singer-songwriter and actor
- Dami Im (born 1988), Australian-Korean singer and songwriter
- Taebin (born Danny Im, 1980), Korean-American singer
- Im Do-hwa (born 1996), South Korean singer and actress
- Im Dong-hyun (born 1986), South Korean archer
- Im Heung-soon (born 1969), South Korean artist and director
- Im Hyun-sik (singer) (born 1992), South Korean singer, member of boy band BtoB
- Im Jae-hyuk (born 1994), South Korean actor
- Nana (entertainer) (born Im Jin-ah, 1991), South Korean singer, actress, and model
- Im Kwon-taek (born 1934), South Korean film director
- Nayeon (born Im Na-yeon, 1995), South Korean singer, member of girl group Twice
- Im Sang-soo (born 1962), South Korean film director
- Im Se-mi (born 1987), South Korean actress
- NC.A (born Im So-eun, 1996), South Korean singer
- Im Soo-hyang (born 1990), South Korean actress
- Im Soo-jung (born 1979), South Korean actress
- Im Sung-han (born 1960), South Korean television screenwriter
- Im Sung-jae (born 1988), South Korean professional golfer
- Im Won-sik (1919–2002), Korean conductor, composer, and educator
- Im Yeojin (born 2002), South Korean singer, former member of girl group Loona and its spinoff Loossemble
- Im Yoon-ah (born 1990), South Korean singer and actress, member of girl group Girls' Generation
- Lim Chang-yong (born 1976), South Korean baseball player
- Dong-Hyek Lim (born 1984), South Korean classical pianist
- Lee Do-hyun (born Lim Dong-Hyun, 1995), South Korean actor
- Lim Dong-won (born 1934), retired South Korean politician
- Lim Eun-ji (born 1989), South Korean pole vaulter
- Hannah Lim (born 2004), Canadian-South Korean ice dancer
- Lim Hyo-jun (born 1996), South Korean-born Chinese short track speed skater
- Lim Hyung-joo (born 1986), South Korean operatic pop tenor and classical crossover singer
- Jay B (born Lim Jae-beom, 1994), South Korean singer and actor, member of boy band Got7
- Lim Ji-yeon (born 1990), South Korean actress
- Lim Jeong-hee (born 1981), South Korean singer
- Lim Jeong-hyun (born 1984), South Korean guitarist
- Lim Ju-hwan (born 1982), South Korean actor
- Lim Nam-kyu (born 1989), South Korean National Luger
- Lim Na-young (born 1995), South Korean singer
- Lim Seul-ong (born 1987), South Korean singer and actor, member of boy band 2AM
- Beenzino (born Lim Sungbin, 1987), South Korean rapper
- Lim Sung-jin (born 1999), South Korea volleyball player
- Lim Yo-hwan (born 1980), South Korean former professional StarCraft player
- Lim Young-woong (born 1991), South Korean singer
- Yunchan Lim (born 2004), South Korean pianist
- Rhim Ju-yeon (born 1976), South Korean comics writer
- Rim Jong-sim (born 1993), North Korean retired weightlifter
- Sunhae Im (born 1976), South Korean opera soprano
- Yim Bang-eun (born 1978), South Korean badminton player
- Yim Soon-rye (born 1961), South Korean film director
- Yim Si-wan (born 1988), South Korean singer and actor, member of boy band ZE:A
- Yim Sung-ah (born 1984), South Korean professional golfer

== See also ==
- List of Korean surnames
