= Chen Der-hwa =

Politician from Taiwan

- 陳德華

Political Deputy Minister of Education of the Republic of China
- In office 30 July 2014 – 16 August 2014
- Minister: Wu Se-hwa
- Administrative Deputy: Lin Shu-chen
- Succeeded by: Lucia Lin

Minister of Education of the Republic of China (acting)
- In office 14 July 2014 – 29 July 2014
- Political Deputy: Huang Pi-twan
- Administrative Deputy: Lin Shu-chen
- Preceded by: Chiang Wei-ling
- Succeeded by: Wu Se-hwa

Political Deputy Minister of Education of the Republic of China
- In office 22 October 2013 – 14 July 2014
- Minister: Chiang Wei-ling
- Administrative Deputy: Lin Shu-chen
- Preceded by: Chen I-hsing

Administrative Deputy Minister of Education of the Republic of China
- In office June 2012 – 22 October 2013
- Minister: Chiang Wei-ling
- Political Deputy: Huang Pi-twan, Chen I-hsing
- Succeeded by: Lin Shu-chen

Personal details
- Education: National Taiwan Normal University (BEd, MEd); National Chengchi University (PhD)

Chen Der-hwa (traditional Chinese: 陳德華; simplified Chinese: 陈德华; pinyin: Chén Déhuá) is a Taiwanese politician. He was the Political Deputy Minister of Education from 22 October 2013 until 16 August 2014 with a brief stint as Minister of Education on 14–29 July 2014 after Chiang Wei-ling resigned due to alleged academic fraud. His appointment to Political Deputy Minister had also come in the wake of the sudden resignation of another predecessor, Chen I-hsing. He had been the Administrative Deputy Minister from June 2012 until October 2013.

== Education ==
Chen graduated from National Taiwan Normal University with a B.Ed. in 1983 and an M.Ed. in 1987. He then earned his Ph.D. from National Chengchi University in education in 2000. His doctoral dissertation was titled, "A study on government policy of providing subsidies to private universities and colleges in Taiwan" (Chinese: 我國政府獎補助私立大學校院政策之研究).

== Early career ==
Chen started his career in 1988 at the Ministry of Education by becoming the Section Chief of the Department of Higher Education in July 1988 until January 1994. He then became the Senior Specialist of the Council of Academic Reviewal and Evaluation in January 1994 until December 1997. Afterwards, he became the Deputy Director of the Department of Higher Education in December 1997 until May 2000. In May-October 2000, he became the Senior Inspector of the Inspector Office. In October 2000 until September 2002, he became the Director-General of the Department of Technological and Vocational Education. He then became the Senior Inspector and Executive Secretary of the Educational Research Committee in September 2002 until May 2004. Afterwards, he became the Director-General of the Department of Higher Education in May 2004 until March 2007. Finally he became the Counselor of Counselors Office in March 2007 until June 2012.
