= Emile Sheng =

Taiwanese politician

Sheng Chih-jen
- 盛治仁
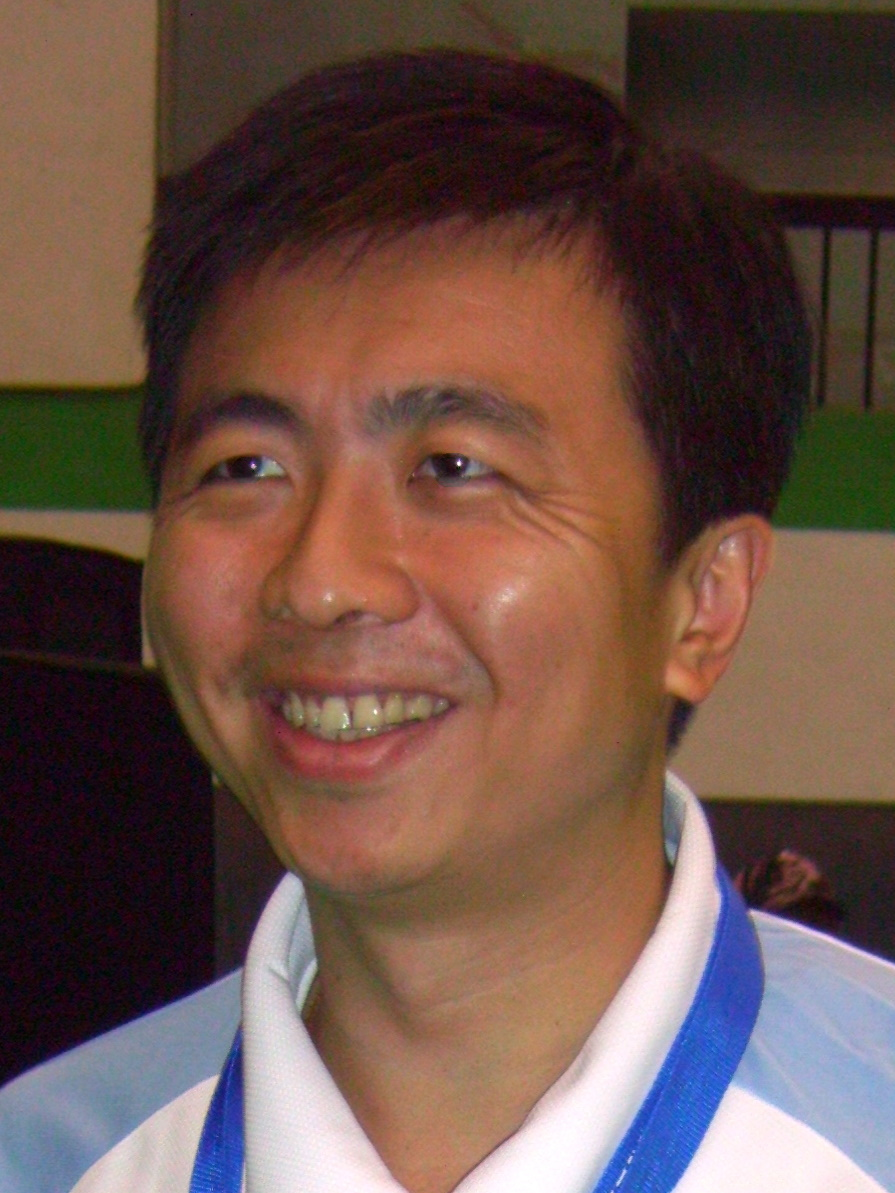

Minister of Council for Cultural Affairs of the Republic of China
- In office 16 November 2009 – 27 November 2011
- Preceded by: Huang Pi-twan
- Succeeded by: Ovid Tzeng

Personal details
- Born: 5 January 1968 (age 57) Kaohsiung, Taiwan
- Education: National Chengchi University (BA); Northwestern University (PhD)

Sheng Chih-jen (Chinese: 盛治仁; pinyin: Shèng Zhìrén; born 5 January 1968), also known by his English name Emile Sheng, is a Taiwanese political scientist. He was the Minister of the Council for Cultural Affairs from 2009 to 2011.

== Education ==
Sheng graduated from National Chengchi University with a bachelor's degree in diplomacy, then completed doctoral studies in the United States, where he earned his Ph.D. in political science from Northwestern University in 1998 under political scientist Benjamin Page. His doctoral dissertation was titled, "Information processing and the evaluation of presidential candidates: Issues, candidates, and partisanship".

== Early career ==
Sheng was the chief executive officer of the 2009 Summer Deaflympics organizing committee in Taipei in 2009.

== Council of Cultural Affairs ==
On 17 November 2011, Sheng tendered his resignation after he was criticized for organizing an extravagant musical to celebrate the 100th anniversary of the National Day of the Republic of China which cost NT$215 million.
