= Cold Fairyland =

Chinese rock music group

Cold Fairyland (Chinese: 冷酷仙境; pinyin: Lěngkù Xiānjìng) is a Chinese rock music group based in Shanghai. Their style combines Eastern melodies and rhythms with Western symphonic rock and classical music. The band has two sides: classical and rock, which allows them to play in concert halls as well as in rock clubs. CFL's music has influences from Portishead, Dead Can Dance, Radiohead, early Genesis, Jethro Tull, Wong Faye and Dou Wei, and their genre is best described as progressive rock.

Cold Fairyland was established 2001 by Lin Di (vocals/pipa/keyboard) and Su Yong (bass). They reworked several songs they had each previously written and made a demo. Unofficially released online, it was soon picked up by the underground record company LStape and released on cassette. This demo later became available as their first CD, Flying Over the City. Later that same year, drummer Li Jia joined the band, and with a few others who came and went, they had their first show at a bar called NowhereTown. In September 2001, they played a cancer benefit at XinTianDi’s ARK Rock Club in Shanghai; this marked the beginning of their long relationship with the club, and they played there at least once a month. They have played in many clubs and festivals across China, including The Beijing MIDI Music Festival, often referred to as the Woodstock of China. CFL began a rotation of guitarists until 2003, settling on Song Jianfeng, a MIDI device engineer who works with Su Yong. Next to join in 2004 was the cellist known as Yao Yao (Zhou Sheng'an) from the Shanghai Opera. Xi Jin'e was added as a keyboard player in the summer of 2008, and Seppo M. Lehto replaced Su Yong on bass guitar in August 2008. Jeremy Lasry took over on bass in 2011.

The name Cold Fairyland comes from a Chinese translation of one of Haruki Murakami's books (known in English as "Hard-Boiled Wonderland and the End of the World") that Lin Di favored. The name reflects the sometimes dark tones of their music.

Composer/arranger/keyboardist and pipa player Lin Di has been playing pipa since she was 4 years old. Her arrangements often bring out elements from cello/pipa/keyboards/bass/drums and guitar.

Cold Fairyland has released six albums, two in Taiwan (as Lin Di / Cold Fairyland) and four in China.

Performances include concerts in Europe, Japan, and across China, including the The Beijing MIDI Music Festival in 2004, 2006, and 2009 (in Zhenjiang). In 2004, Cold Fairyland contributed to the John Lennon Tribute of Yu Yin Tang Music and performed and recorded the song "Eleanor Rigby".

The band is made up of 3 married couples: Lin and Lasry, Zhou and Li, Song and Xi.

== Lineup ==
- Lin Di 林笛 : pipa, ruan, keyboards, vocals
- Su Yong 苏勇 : bass, background vocals (2001-2008.8)
- Seppo M. Lehto : bass, (2008.8-2011.3)
- Jeremy Lasry : bass (2011.3-)
- Zhou Sheng'an 周圣安 : cello, background vocals
- Li Jia 李佳: drums and percussion, background vocals
- Song Jianfeng 宋建丰: guitars
- Xi Jin'e 奚近萼 : keyboards (2008.6-)

== Discography ==
- The Best of Cold Fairyland 2001-2015

Digital Album. Studio versions of the songs as they were played live and recorded in 2009 at Shanghai Synergy Studios.

1:Mirror Theatre 摹仿剧场

2:A-Jia-Li-Ya-Lai 阿加裡亞萊

3:Mosul 摩苏尔

4:Dead Children in Newspapers 死在报纸上的孩子

5:The Flood 洪水

6:A Desperate Flower in Your Hand 手心里的绝望花

7:Mountain Song of the High Lands 高地山歌

8:Wake 守护

9:Autumn Sleep 沉睡秋天

10:Black Wings 黑色的翅膀

11:Little Fairy 小仙子

12: Waiting for Farewell 等待告别

- The Best of Cold Fairyland 2001-2015

LP version. Studio versions of the songs as they were played live and recorded in 2009 at Shanghai Synergy Studios.

A.side

1:Wake 守护

2:Mosul 摩苏尔

3:Dead Children in Newspapers 死在报纸上的孩子

4:The Flood 洪水

B.Side

1:Shadow Play 光影游戏

2:Water 水

3:Black Wings 黑色的翅膀

4: Waiting for Farewell 等待告别

- Seeds on the Ground 地上的种子 - 2007

Mostly acoustic songs with drums and some electric guitar, no keyboards. The music is written in Sonata Form. This CD shows the classical side of Cold Fairyland, and depending on the venue, it will be performed either in its original form or in a heavier electric style.

1:Seeds on the Ground 地上的种子

2:Shadow Play 光影游戏

3:Five Travelers 五人同游

4:Puzzle 缭乱

5:Solemn, Silent Circle 肃静的旋转

6:Moon at the Fortified Pass 关山月

7:Reawakening 苏醒

8:Cloud Riding 腾云驾雾

9:Forest Dance 轮舞

10:Ice Castle 冰封之国

11:Ghost Town Nightmare 荒城梦魇

Seeds on the Ground )A( Acustronik Mix by Seppo M. Lehto 2008, download only.

Seeds on the Ground )B( Acustronik Mix by Seppo M. Lehto 2010, download only, bass by Seppo M. Lehto.

- Live at ARK- 冷酷仙境 2005现场 - 2006

Recorded live at ARK Music Club 2005, Shanghai.

1:Mirror Theater 摹仿剧场

2:Dead Children in Newspapers 死在报纸上的孩子

3:Mosul 摩苏尔

4:Puzzle 缭乱

5:The Blessed Place 福地

6:The Flood 洪水

7:Assassination 暗杀

8.Paris Cat 巴黎猫

9:Class Cutter 玻璃刀

10:A Seed On The Ground 地上的种子

11:A Desperate Flower in Your Hand 手心里的绝望花

12:Waiting For Farewell 等待告别

- Ten Days In Magic Land - 魔境十日 - 2004, Solo Album by Lin Di

1:The First Day: Dance of Seduction 诱惑之舞

2:The Second Day: Repentance Day 忏悔日

3:The Third Day: The Blessed Place 福地

4:The Fourth Day: A Desperate Flower in Your Hand 手心里的绝望花

5:The Fifth Day: The Flood 洪水

6:The Sixth Day: Slaves 奴隶们

7:The Seventh Day: Mirror Theater 摹仿剧场

8:The Eighth Day: The Dusk In The Deep Green Prairie 绿草原深处的黄昏

9:The Ninth Day: Wake 守护

10:The Tenth Day: Reincarnation 循回

- Bride in Legend - 迷路新娘 - 2004, Solo Album by Lin Di

An epic album that tells a story: a young girl's journey to marry a man afar becomes a quest for her own destiny and her life. Deserts, oases, exotic natural scenes, wars, and dreams all emerge in the music.

1:Yilang Yilang 依蘭依蘭

2:Marriage 嫁

3:Mountain Song of the High Lands 高地山歌

4:Riddle in the Bronze Mirrors 謎語銅鏡

5:Speechless in Forest 失語叢林

6:A-jia-li-yalai 阿加裡亞萊

7:Love 愛

8:Mula-shabel War 慕拉沙貝大戰

9:Colorless Sun 陽光褪去了顏色

10:Heal the Wounds of Time 療治時間的創傷

- Kingdom of Benevolent Strangers - 陌生仙子国 - 2003

1:3AM 凌晨三点

2:Soaring 飞翔主题

3:Autumn Sleep 沉睡秋天

4:Glass Cutter 玻璃刀

5:Dead Children In Newspapers 死在报纸上的孩子

6:DuDu! You Say 嘟嘟对你说

7:A Desperate Flower in Your Hand 手心里绝望的花

8:Paris Cat 巴黎猫

9:Little Fairy Girl 小仙子

10: Color of Sunset 暮色

- Flying Over The City - 2001

1:Morning 晨

2:Sea Rose

3:Black Wing 黑色的翅膀

4:Who Knows 谁知

5:Only One 唯一

6:Very... 很

7:Waiting For Farewell 等待告别

Remastered 2008, available only as a download, including 2 additional songs: Child and a Feather (acoustic studio live), Black Wing (Karaoke)

== Songs appearing on compilation CDs ==
- Eleanor Rigby - John Lennon Tribute - Give Live a Chance - 2004 - China
- Mirror Theatre - Rock and Roll Music Mag Issue 2006.4 insert CD. Booklet and CD with Zhou Sheng'an on both covers. www.xmusicmag.com - China
- Little Fairy - Everyday You Live, Another Day I Die...Vol 3 - CD - 2011 - UK
- Shadow Play (Acustronik Mix) - The Rough Guide To The Music Of China - CD - 2012 - UK

== DVD and video ==
- Cold Fairyland, Finland Tour 2008
- Collection of bass guitar study sheet music videos:
- https://www.youtube.com/user/unclezeppy?feature=mhee#p/u/7/m4Rmps9MBcw
- http://www.tudou.com/programs/view/MPLBpnqUEg0/

== Awards ==
- 2008 Shanghai City Weekend Magazine, Bar and Restaurant Awards, Editor's Pick "The Best Locally Based Band"
- 2009 China Music Awards -Lin Di- "Strength For New Life" Award
