= Chen I-hsing =

Taiwanese academic

- 陳益興

Political Deputy Minister of Education of the Republic of China
- Minister: Chiang Wei-ling
- Succeeded by: Chen Der-hwa

Personal details
- Education: National Taiwan University (BA, MA, PhD)

Chen I-hsing (Chinese: 陳益興; pinyin: Chén Yìxīng) is a Taiwanese academic. He was the Political Deputy Minister of the Ministry of Education (MOE) of the Executive Yuan from 2009 until October 2013.

== Education ==
Chen earned his bachelor's degree, master's degree, and Ph.D. from National Taiwan University in 1979, 1983, and 1999, respectively.

== Early career ==
Chen had served as officer, specialist, division head and commissioner within the MOE in 1982–1995. Afterwards, he served as Director of National Taiwan Arts Education Center until 1996. In 1996–2005, he became the assistant commissioner of the department of education of Taipei City Government. In 2005–2007, he was the director of the department of secondary education of MOE. In 2007–2009, he became the director of National Taiwan Science Education Center.
