= Wu Se-hwa =

Taiwanese academic

- 吳思華
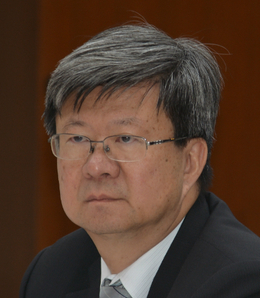
- Wu in October 2015

26th Minister of Education of the Republic of China
- In office 30 July 2014 – 20 May 2016
- Political Deputy: Huang Pi-twan, Chen Der-hwa
- Administrative Deputy: Lin Shu-chen
- Preceded by: Chiang Wei-ling; Chen Der-hwa (acting)
- Succeeded by: Pan Wen-chung

Personal details
- Born: 9 July 1955 (age 70) Beigang, Yunlin, Taiwan
- Education: National Chiao Tung University (BS); National Chengchi University (MBA, PhD)

Wu Se-hwa (Chinese: 吳思華; pinyin: Wú Sīhuá; born 9 July 1955) is a Taiwanese academic who was the Minister of Education in the Executive Yuan of Taiwan from 2014 to 2016.

== Education ==
Wu graduated from National Chiao Tung University with a bachelor's degree in communication engineering in 1973. He then earned a master's degree in 1979 and a Ph.D. in business administration with a specialization in strategic management and knowledge management creativity from National Chengchi University in 1984.

== Early career ==
In 1983–1984, Wu was an instructor at NCCU. In 1984, he was promoted to become an associate professor and subsequently a professor from 1989 onward. In 1990–1994, he was the vice dean of the Center for Public and Business Administration Education. In 1994, he founded and became the director of the Graduate Institute of Technology Innovation Management until 1999. In 1999–2005, he became the dean of the College of Commerce. In 2005–2006, he became the director of the Center for Creativity and Innovation Studies. And finally in 2006–2014 he became the president of NCCU.
