= Providence University =

Catholic university in Shalu, Taichung City, Taiwan

- 靜宜大學
- Motto: 進德、修業 (Pe̍h-ōe-jī: Tō-tek, siu-gia̍p)
- Motto in English: Virtue with Knowledge
- Type: Private (Roman Catholic)
- Established: 1956
- Affiliations: Association of Christian Universities and Colleges in Asia; U12 Consortium
- President: Lucia Lin
- Academic staff: 346
- Students: 11,895
- Undergraduates: 10,716
- Postgraduates: 1,179
- Location: Shalu, Taichung, Taiwan; 24°13′37″N 120°34′48″E
- Website: pu.edu.tw

Providence University (PU; Chinese: 靜宜大學; pinyin: Jìngyí Dàxué; Pe̍h-ōe-jī: Chēng-gî Tāi-ha̍k) is a Catholic university in Shalu District, Taichung City, Taiwan. Providence University is one of the U12 Consortium member schools, and is one of two Taiwan universities participating in the ISEP network.

== History ==
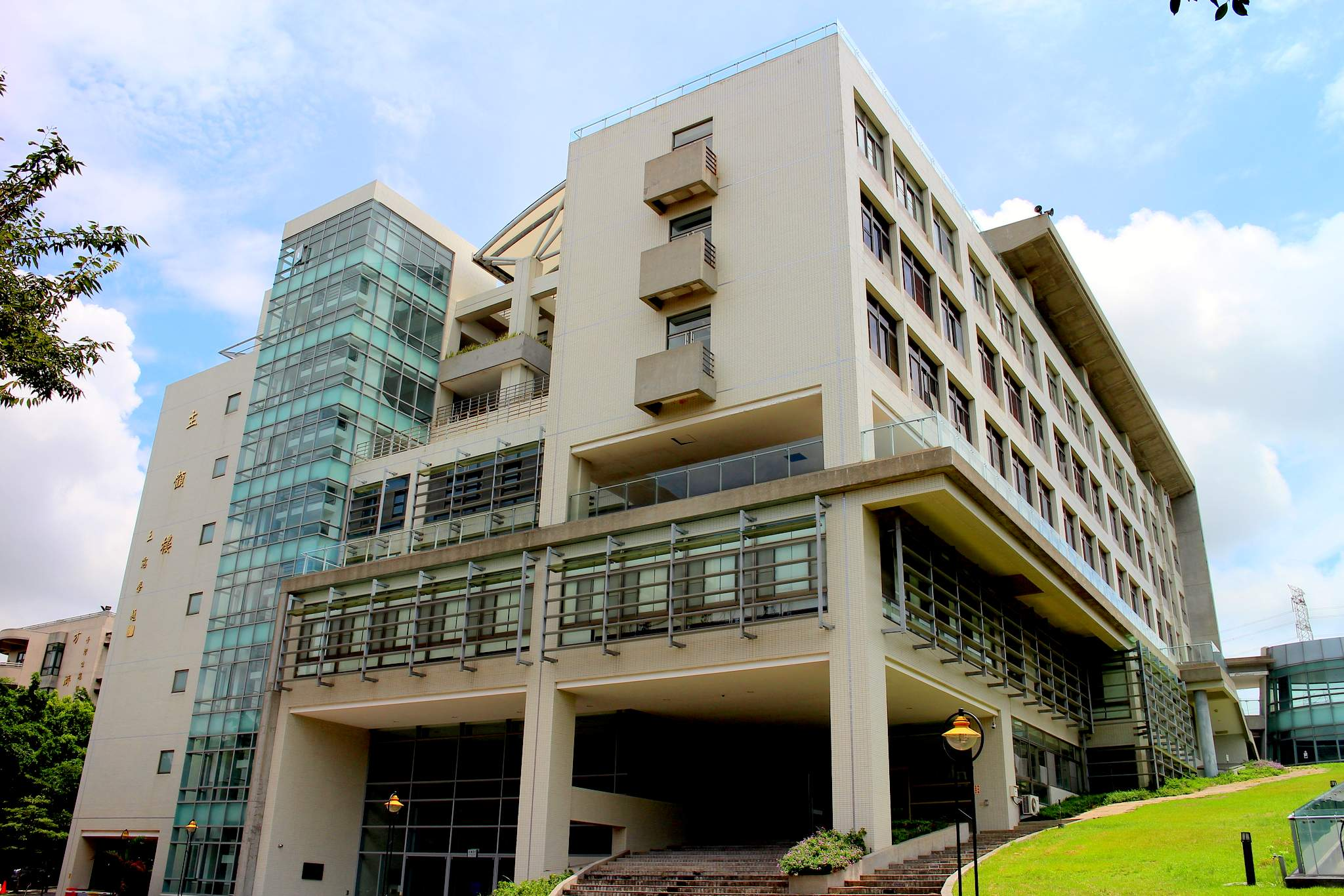
Providence Hall

Providence University was founded by an American congregation, the Sisters of Providence of Saint Mary-of-the-Woods (Indiana, United States). In the summer of 1919, Bishop Joseph Tacconi of Kaifeng, Henan Province, Republic of China, met with Sisters of Providence general superior Mother Mary Cleophas Foley to request sisters for a school for young women in Kaifeng. In 1921 Mother Marie Gratia Luking (1885–1964) and five other Sisters of Providence founded the Hua-Mei Girls' Elementary and High Schools there, one of the first schools for girls in China. In the spring of 1929, the school was forced to close because of political turbulence.

The Providence Sisters, enthusiastic about female education, endeavored to establish another school in spite of the critical situation. In 1932, by the effort of the Board of Trustees, Ching-Yi Girls' High School was instituted in Kaifeng. Cardinal Paul Yü Pin was the first chairperson of the Board of Trustees, and Chi-Liang Ing was the first president of the school. In 1942, Mother Gratia and the other sisters were imprisoned and did not regain their freedom until 1945.

In 1948, the Chinese Civil War forced the sisters to retreat first to Shanghai and later to Taiwan.

In July 1989, it was renamed the "Providence University for Women". In 1993, it assumed its current name "Providence University", and began to enroll male students.

== Successive principals ==
No	Name	Term
1	Jing-an Ho (何靜安)	1956－1957
2	Shih-jung Kung (龔士榮)	1957－1959
3	Jen-yu Tsai (蔡任漁)	1959－1971
4	Anthony Guo (郭藩)	August 1971－July 1990
5	Hsi-kuang Hsu (徐熙光)	August 1990－January 1994
6	R. C. T. Lee	February 1994－June 1999
7	Chen-kuei Chen (陳振貴)	July 1999－July 2002
8	Ming-te Yu (俞明德)	August 2002－July 2010
9	Chuan-yi Tang (唐傳義)	August 2010－?
10	Lucia Lin	August 2022 –

== Academics ==
College of Foreign Languages and Literature	Department of English Language, Literature and Linguistics	Department of Japanese Language and Literature
College of Foreign Languages and Literature	Department of Spanish Language and Literature	

College of Humanities and Social Sciences	Department of Chinese Literature	Department of Ecological Humanities	Center for Taiwan Studies
College of Humanities and Social Sciences	Department of Social Work and Child Welfare	Department of Mass Communication	
College of Humanities and Social Sciences	Department of Taiwanese Literature	Graduate Institute of Education	
College of Humanities and Social Sciences	Department of Law	Center for Teacher Education	

College of Sciences	Department of Financial and Computational Mathematics	Department of Applied Chemistry
College of Sciences	Department of Food and Nutrition	Department of Cosmetic Science
College of Sciences	Department of Data Science and Big Data Analytics	

College of Management	Department of International Business	Department of Business Administration
College of Management	Department of Accounting	Department of Tourism
College of Management	Department of Finance	Business Management Program (Continuing Education)
College of Management	Executive Master of Business Administration	Master Program in Innovation Management and Entrepreneurship

College of Computing and Informatics	Department of Computer Science and Information Management	Department of Computer Science and Information Engineering
College of Computing and Informatics	Department of Computer Science and Communication Engineering	Master Program in Applied Information and Technology Management

International College	Global Master of Business Administration	Global Foreign Language Education Program
International College	International Business Administration Program	Foreign Language Center

Center for General Education

Industrial College

== Campus Building ==
=== Anthony Guo Hall ===
This building is named after the memorial of 4th principal of school: Anthony Guo. Inside the building is College of Humanities and Social Sciences, College of Continuing Education, Department of Law, Department of Mass Communication, Department of Social Work and Child Welfare, Art Center, Center for Computer & Communication and International Conference Hall.

== Transportation ==
=== Taichung City Bus ===
==== Taichung Bus ====
- Route 300
- Route 304
- Route 307
- Route 309
- Route 310
- Route 659

==== United Highway Bus ====
- Route 300
- Route 301
- Route 303
- Route 308
- Route 309
- Route 310
- Route 326

==== CTbus ====
- Route 162
- Route 302

==== GEYA Bus ====
- Route 68
- Route 167
- Route 300
- Route 305
- Route 306
- Route 309
- Route 310
- Route 353

==== Kuo-kuang Motor ====
- Route A2

=== Freeway Bus ===
==== Ho-hsin Bus ====
- Route 7511

=== Road ===
- Taiwan Boulevard
- Taichung Interchange, Freeway 1 (Taiwan)
- Shalu Interchange, Freeway 3 (Taiwan)

=== Taiwan Railway ===
- Shalu Station
- Taichung Main Station

== See also ==
- List of universities in Taiwan
  - List of schools in the Republic of China reopened in Taiwan
