= Lâm =

Lâm is a Vietnamese surname. The name is transliterated as Lin in Mandarin and Im in Korean.

Lam is the anglicized variation of the surname Lâm.

Lam is also a commonly held surname of Cantonese speakers of Chinese descent. Large populations in southern China and Hong Kong hold the surname.

== Notable people with the surname Lâm ==
- Lam Phương, 20th century Vietnamese songwriter, real name Lâm Đình Phùng
- Lam Nguon Tanh (Lâm Ngươn Tánh), Chief of Naval Operations of the Republic of Vietnam Navy during the Vietnam War
- Thích Quảng Đức (born Lâm Văn Tức), Mahayana Buddhist monk who burned himself to death at a busy Saigon road intersection on 11 June 1963
- Lam Nhat Tien, Vietnamese American singer
- Lam Quang Thi, senior military officer in the Army of the Republic of Vietnam during the Vietnam War
- Lam Quang My, late Polish-Vietnamese poet who wrote in Polish and Vietnamese
- Lam Van Phat, an officer in the Army of the Republic of Vietnam
- Lâm Quang Ky, a vice-general of Nguyen Trung Truc
- Lâm Thị Mỹ Dạ, poet
- Katarina Lam, United States data scientist
