= Kanna Hayashi =

Scientific researcher into drugs

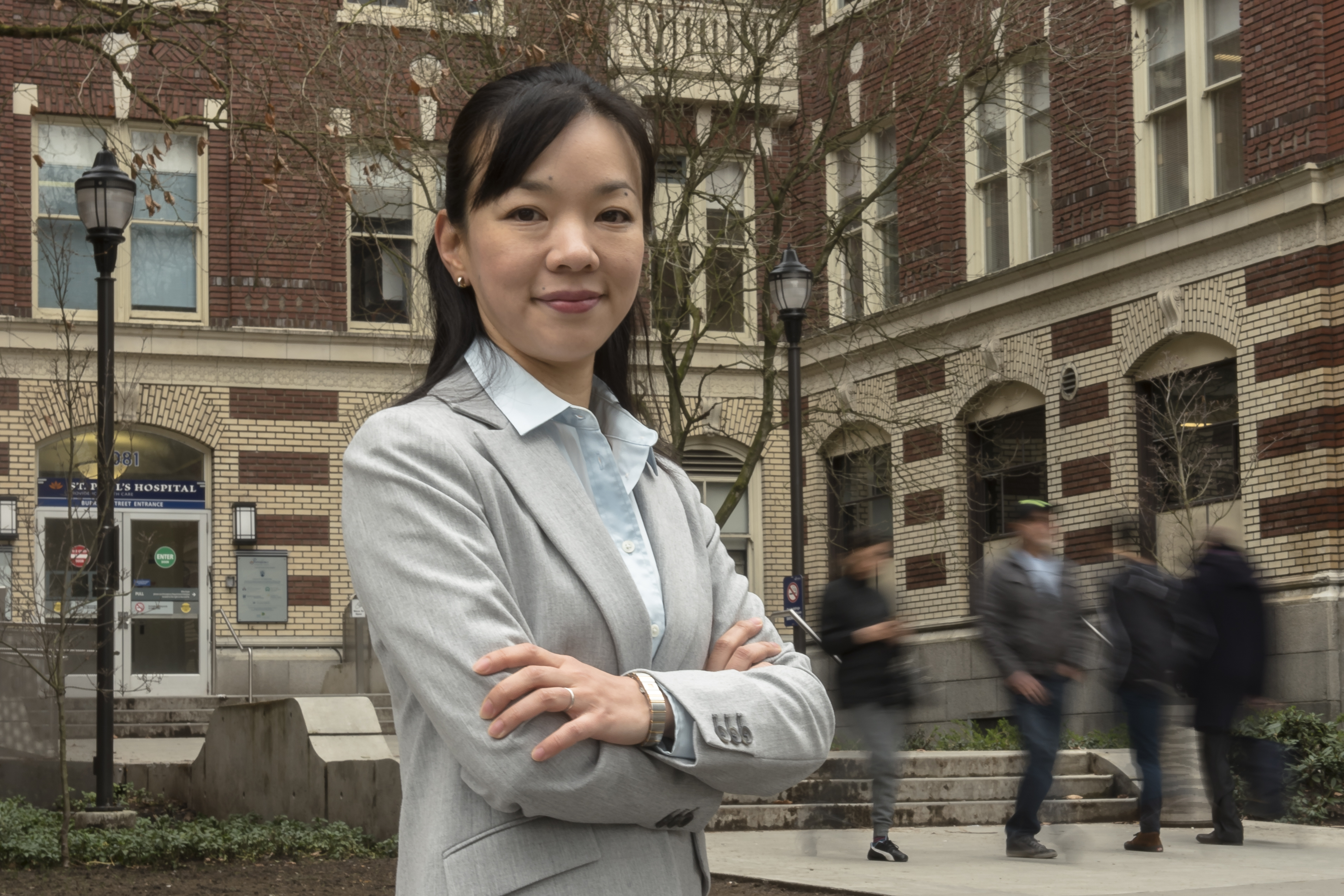
- Hayashi in 2017.
- Born: Tokyo, Japan

Academic background
- Education: B.A., Tokyo University of Foreign Studies; MA, MIA, 2009, Columbia University; PhD, 2013, University of British Columbia
- Thesis: Policing and public health: experiences of people who inject drugs in Bangkok, Thailand (2013)

Kanna Hayashi is a Japanese health scientist. She is an associate professor at Simon Fraser University and St. Paul's Hospital Chair in Substance Use Research.

== Early life and education ==
Hayashi completed her Bachelor's degree at the Tokyo University of Foreign Studies before moving to North America for her Master of International Affairs at Columbia University. She then earned her PhD in interdisciplinary studies from the University of British Columbia (UBC) in 2013. During her PhD studies, Hayashi helped found the Mitsampan Community Research Project. Hayashi remained at UBC following her PhD to conduct postdoctoral research in illicit drug use and related harms. In 2014, she received the Royal Society of Canada's Alice Wilson Award as a woman with "outstanding academic qualifications who is entering a career in scholarship or research at the postdoctoral level." The following year, Hayashi also received a UBC Killam Postdoctoral Research Prize and Canadian Institutes of Health Research New Investigator Award for her research.

== Career ==
Upon completing her postdoctoral studies, Hayashi joined the faculty at Simon Fraser University in September 2016. The next year, she was appointed the inaugural St. Paul’s Chair in Substance Use Research at the BC Centre on Substance Use. In this role, Hayashi leads the Vancouver Injection Drug Users Study and Mitsampan Community Research Project. During the COVID-19 pandemic, Hayashi received the Canadian Institutes of Health Research's Operating Grant: COVID-19 Mental Health & Substance Use Service Needs and Delivery.

== Selected publications ==
The following is a list of selected publications:

- High rates of midazolam injection and associated harms in Bangkok, Thailand (2013)
