= Kevin Lim =

Indonesian singer and songwriter (born 1994)

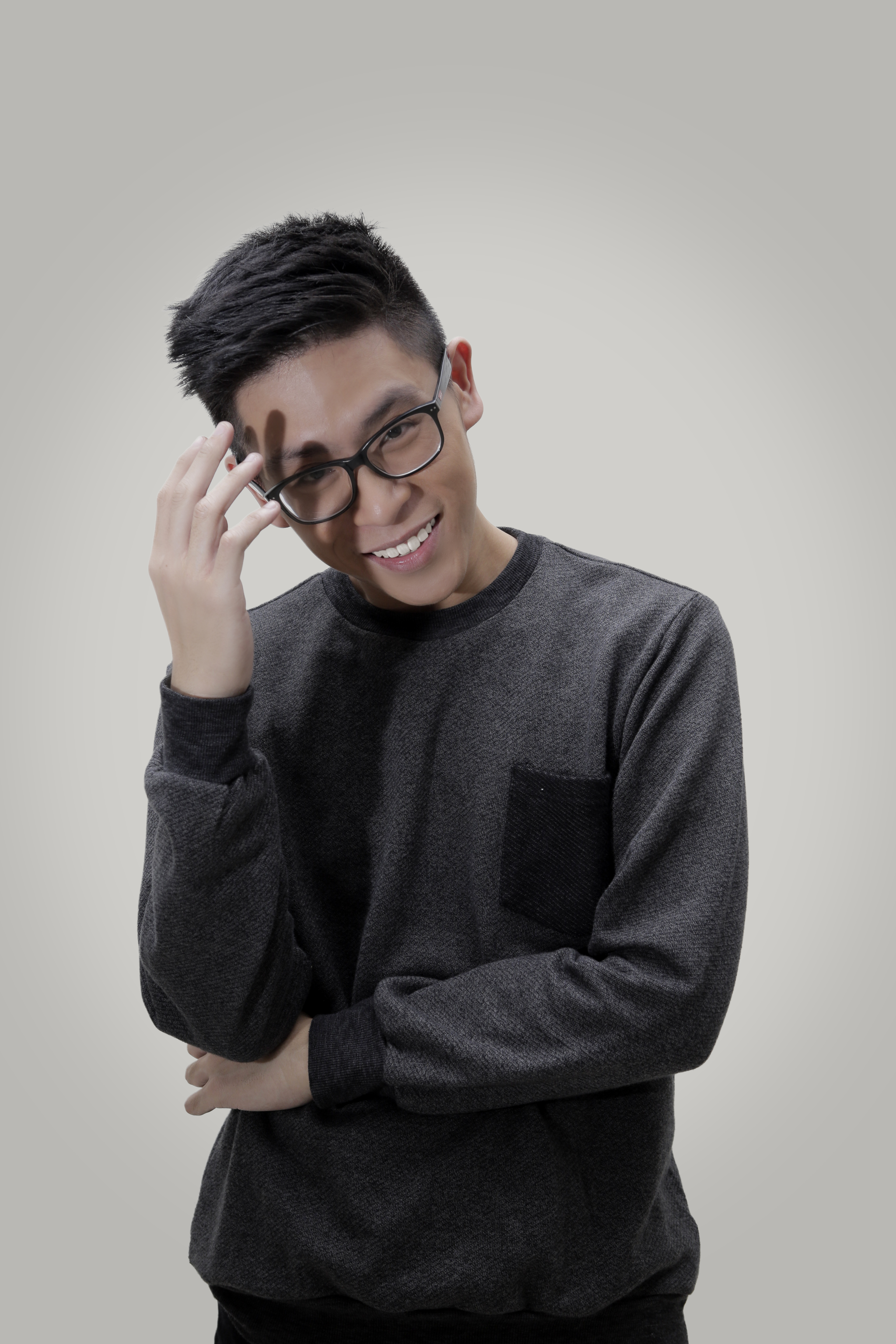
- Born: Kevin Lim; May 2, 1994 (age 32); Jakarta, DKI Jakarta, Indonesia
- Occupations: Singer; Songwriter
- Years active: 2015–present
- Musical career
- Genres: Pop; Synth Pop
- Instruments: Vocal; Guitar; Keyboard
- Label: Universal Music Indonesia

Kevin Lim (born May 2, 1994) is an Indonesian singer and songwriter. He started gaining Indonesian public attention through his first single "Cinta Kita Beda" (Our Love is Different) produced by his label, Universal Music Indonesia (a subsidiary of Universal Music Group).

== Early life ==
Kevin Lim was born in Jakarta to a family of Chinese ancestry who does not have any musical background. His interest in music came from his childhood story told by his father on how he always wanted to be a pop singer as a teenager. As a little boy, Kevin was exposed to a large amount of secular music, including the works of Michael Jackson, whom Kevin draw inspiration from. He sang in church throughout his high school years and tried out for various different talent show. After obtaining his bachelor's degree in economics from Curtin University of Technology in 2014, he worked in one of the big four public accountant company in Indonesia. Although after a while he chose to resign and pursue his career in music when he was signed by Universal Music Indonesia. He was discovered through YouTube, with the help of a music competition called Meet The Labels.

== Career ==
=== 2015 - 2016: Cinta Kita Beda ===
After signing his recording artist contract with his current label, he released his first single "Cinta Kita Beda" (Our Love is Different) featuring the winner of the 8th season of Indonesian Idol, Nowela. This song is written by Siska Salman and arranged by Nico Veryandi. Through this single, Kevin received his first nomination in Dahsyatnya Awards 2016, under the Outstanding Duet/Collaboration category along with many top-tier singers in Indonesia.

== Discography ==
=== Single ===
- Terimalah (2017)
- Cinta Kita Beda (ft. Nowela) (2015)
- Mukjizat yang Besar (2025)

== Awards and nominations ==
Year	Ceremony	Award	Nominated work	Result	Ref.
2016	Dahsyatnya Awards	Outstanding Duet/Collaboration	"Cinta Kita Beda (ft. Nowela)"	Nominated	
