= Yasunori Hayashi =

Japanese neuroscientist (born 1965)

Yasunori Hayashi (林 康紀, Hayashi Yasunori; born July 28, 1965) is a Japanese neuroscientist who was born in Aichi and grew up in Tokyo. He leads a research group at the RIKEN Brain Science Institute, Japan.

== Education and research history ==
Hayashi completed an MD at the Faculty of Medicine at Kyoto University from 1984 to 1990, and continued with his PhD at the faculty's Institute for Immunology and Department of Pharmacology from 1990 to 1994. From 1994 to 1996 he was a Postdoctoral Fellow at the Department of Neurophysiology of the Institute for Brain Research at the Faculty of Medicine in the University of Tokyo, then in Cold Spring Harbor Laboratory from 1996 to 2000.

From 2000 to 2009 he was Assistant Professor (joint) at the RIKEN-MIT Neuroscience Research Center, at the Picower Institute for Learning and Memory, Department of Brain and Cognitive Sciences, Massachusetts Institute of Technology, and also, during the same period, the Senior Scientist (joint) at RIKEN's Brain Science Institute, becoming Unit Leader (joint) in 2004. In 2009 he became the team leader at the institute.

== Awards and honors ==
In 1998, Hayashi received the Young Investigator Award from the Japanese Pharmacological Society. In 2008 he received both the JSPS Prize for Young Investigators, and the Japan Academy Medal
