= Francis Y. Lin =

Chinese linguist

Academic background
- Education: University of Oxford (PhD), University of Essex (PhD)
- Thesis: Grammar, meaning and understanding : an inquiry into grammatical and semantic competence (2002)

Academic work
- Discipline: linguistics, computer science
- Sub-discipline: philosophy of linguistics, syntax, philosophy of language, Wittgenstein
- Institutions: Beijing International Studies University; Beihang University (2010-2016); Beijing Normal University (2004-2010); Goldsmiths, University of London (2000-2004)

Francis Yunqing Lin is a Chinese linguist and professor at Beijing International Studies University. He is known for his critique of generative grammar.

== Critique of universal grammar ==
In an article, published in Lingua, Lin tries to provide a refutation of universal grammar based on methodological grounds. He points out that the very method for discovering the grammar makes it impossible to discover any innate linguistic universals. John J. Kim (from San Francisco State University) and Tong Wu (from Central China Normal University) has replied to Lin's views. Lin has published a reply to Kim's arguments.
