= Im Che =

Korean writer (1549–1587)

- Hangul: 임제
- Hanja: 林悌
- RR: Im Je
- MR: Im Che

Im Che (Korean: 임제; Hanja: 林悌; 1549–1587) was a Confucianist yangban (nobleman) in Joseon.

== Works ==
Im penned the following sijo upon the death of famed gisaeng, Hwang Jini.

청산리 벽계수(靑山裏 碧溪水)청초 우거진 골에 자는다 누웠는다
홍안(紅顔)은 어디 두고 백골(白骨)만 묻혔는다
잔 잡아 권할 이 없으니 그를 설워 하노라

Below this deep green grave
do you sleep? Are you resting?
Where are your blushing cheeks?
Only white bones remain.
This cup breaks my heart:
She is not here to sip it.

The following two poems were exchanged between Im Che and his lover, gisaeng Hanu (한우; 寒雨). Im was known for his liaisons with Hanu and Hwang Jin Yi. The term in line 3, ch'an bi (찬비), literally translates as "freezing rain." It uses the same Chinese characters as the poetess' name (寒雨), but with a different pronunciation, and was intended by both poets as a pun.

북천이 맑다커늘 우장 없이 길을 나니
산에는 눈이 오고 들에는 찬 비로다
오늘은 찬 비 맞았시니 얼어 잘가 하노라

They called for clear weather.
I left without a coat
but snow fell on the mountain,
freezing rain on the fields.
Rain has frozen me today:
I shiver on my mat tonight.
- Im Che to Hanu

Hanu's particular gift is to echo the style of the original that Im wrote to her, while improving on it with a teasing, very human tone. The translation employs a formal tone to match Im's original; and then follows with the simpler and more lyric style used by Hanu. In both cases, the line "rain has frozen" seemed to best communicate the double entendre of the originals.

어이 얼어자리 무슨 이로 얼어 자리
원앙침(鴛鴦枕) 비취금(翡翠衾)을 어디두고 얼어 자리
오늘은 찬비 맞았으니 녹아 잘까 하노라

How can you stand that frigid mat?
Here is my bed
with ducks embroidered on pillows
and a soft jade quilt.
Rain has frozen you today:
Melt with me tonight.
- Hanu's response to Im Che

When about to die, he grieved and left the words below.

四海諸國, 未有不稱帝者, 獨我邦終古不能, 生於若此陋邦, 其死何足惜.

Although all Four Barbarians have joined, Zhongyuan, but only Korea had left behind. There's no use of living long for such a miserable country.

— Im Che
