= Malone Lam =

Cybercriminal (born 2004)

- 林誉轩
- Mug shot of Lam in 2024
- Born: Malone Lam Yu Xuan; 19 July 2004 (age 22); Singapore
- Other names: Anne Hathaway; King Greavys (or Greavy); $$$; 7; Kg

Details
- Date apprehended: 18 September 2024

Malone Lam
- Traditional Chinese: 林譽軒
- Simplified Chinese: 林誉轩
Transcriptions
Standard Mandarin
- Hanyu Pinyin: Lín Yùxuān
Southern Min
- Hokkien POJ: Lêm Ū-hian

Malone Lam Yu Xuan (born 19 July 2004) is a Singaporean man convicted for his connection to a cryptocurrency theft and money laundering scheme exceeding $260 million, according to the U.S. Attorney's Office for the District of Columbia.

In 2024, Lam and his associates stole more than 4,100 Bitcoin from a single investor, in what authorities described as the largest known single-victim cryptocurrency heist in history and the first Bitcoin-related Racketeer Influenced and Corrupt Organizations (RICO) Act in history. Lam admitted to being involved in multiple crypto thefts. In September 2026, Lam pleaded guilty to participating in a RICO conspiracy. He is currently awaiting sentencing.

== Early life and education ==
Lam grew up in Singapore. He attended Unity Secondary School in Choa Chu Kang, where he dropped out of eighth grade at age 13. In his later teenage years, Lam became involved in cryptocurrency trading and online gaming communities, including Minecraft and Discord.

In October 2023, he moved to the United States, residing in Miami, Los Angeles, and the Hamptons. He entered the United States via the Visa Waiver Program, which had expired by 2024.

== Background ==
Lam started a social engineering enterprise with two roommates while living in Texas. Over the following months, the group grew to 14 members from California, Connecticut, New York, and Florida, as well as outside the United States. The group targeted people with large amounts of cryptocurrency, identified through hacked databases, information purchased on the dark web, and phishing e-mails. The stolen currency would then be laundered and cashed out into physical fiat money. By 2024, members of the group began arming themselves with guns, and on 8 July of the same year, the group burglarized the home of a victim in New Mexico, stealing hardware containing cryptocurrency.

According to The New York Times, Lam and his co-conspirator Jeandiel Serrano live-streamed a social engineering heist to friends online and later used the stolen funds to go on a spending spree involving 33 luxury cars, jewelry, travel, and nightclubs, reportedly spending US$ 4,000,000 in Los Angeles nightclubs within a month, before being arrested within a month of the theft.

Lam was arrested by the Federal Bureau of Investigation (FBI) on 18 September 2024 in Miami. He had thrown his mobile phone into Biscayne Bay before being apprehended, having been informed by an off-duty police officer of his impending arrest. The network surrounding Lam continued its activities until May 2025.

In 2025, a superseding federal indictment expanded the case, describing a wider criminal enterprise that allegedly operated from 2023 to 2025. According to the indictment, Lam and 12 others orchestrated additional thefts. In November 2025, it was reported that U.S. prosecutors had offered Lam a new plea deal. As of May 2026, nine defendants had pleaded guilty to charges, some of whom voiced a willingness to testify against Lam. On 8 September 2026, Lam pleaded guilty to participating in a RICO conspiracy, and a status hearing is scheduled for December.

== See also ==
- Jimmy Zhong
