= Im Sang-ok =

Joseon trader (1779–1855)

Im Sang-ok (Korean: 임상옥; Hanja: 林尙沃; 1779–1855) was a trader in the mid-Joseon period. His bongwan is Jeonju, courtesy name is Gyeongyak (경약; 景若), art name is (가포; 稼圃). He was born in Uiju, North Pyongan Province.

== Historical background ==
Joseon had the worst environment for merchants to do business. Many products were forbidden from trading, and trade with other countries was illegal. Because ginseng from Joseon was popular during the Qing dynasty and the Chinese paid a lot for it, Im smuggled it to them.

== Story ==
After Im Sang-ok's father died, he took on his father's debt and worked as an assistant under the merchant Hong Deukju. In Uiju, there was a tradition that they do not pay employees, but after five to ten years, if they think the employee has potential they support him to start his own business. Im was allowed to start a business with Hong's support, and he went to Beijing. He visited the prostitute quarter and bought a woman for a night with all his money. He did not do anything to her and she asked his name. He was later criticized and expelled from the merchant group. Ten years later the woman became the wife of a high-ranking bureaucrat in Qing. She found Im and gave him ten times of money he spent for buying her.

One man brought ginseng and asked Im to evaluate it. He correctly answered that it was transplanted somewhere else and grown. As a result he was given the moniker "Bakmulgunja" (박물군자; 博物君子; lit. one with deep knowledge in everything) and no one tried to cheat him.

There was a high-ranking bureaucrat, Park Jonggyung, who was an uncle of the king. Im sponsored him with 5000 nyang, multiple times of amount what others have given him. Park called Im to his house and asked him if he knows how many people come and go in a day. Im Sang-ok said there are only two people: those who can benefit him and those who can harm him. Park liked his answer and thought he had potential, later supporting his business.

When Im Sang-ok went to Beijing to sell ginseng there was one problem with ginseng trade: the price. Chinese merchants bought ginseng brought by merchants from Joseon at cheap prices as it was illegal trade. One day Chinese merchants became jealous of Im right to sell ginseng, so they boycotted him to force him to further lower the price. In response, Im burned his ginseng in his yard and called the Chinese merchants. Frightened, they bought ginseng at a high price. His actions led him to be recommended as a bureaucrat.

== Published works ==
- 〈가포집〉 Gapojip
- 〈적중일기(寂中日記)〉 Jeok jung il gi
