= Yukina Hayashi =

Japanese volleyball player (born 1996)

Personal information
- Full name: Yukina Hayashi
- Nickname: Yukina
- Born: March 23, 1996 (age 30) Tokyo, Japan
- Height: 1.79 m (5 ft 10 in)
- Weight: 68 kg (150 lb)
- Spike: 298 cm (117 in)
- Block: 285 cm (112 in)

Volleyball information
- Position: Middle Blocker
- Current club: Toray Arrows
- Number: 18

Yukina Hayashi (林有紀奈 Hayashi Yukina, born March 23, 1996) is a Japanese volleyball player who plays for Toray Arrows.

== Clubs ==
- (Japan) Shimokitazawa Seitoku high school
- (Japan) Toray Arrows (2014-)
