= Helmut Krawinkler =

Austrian-born American structural engineer (1940–2012)

- Born: 6 April 1940
- Died: 16 April 2012 (aged 72)
- Education: Vienna University of Technology; California State University San Jose; University of California, Berkeley
- Known for: Performance-based earthquake engineering
- Awards: Honorary member of the Structural Engineers Association of Northern California (SEAONC) (2004); SEAONC College of Fellows (2003); G.W. Housner Medal (2012); National Academy of Engineering (2012)
- Scientific career
- Fields: Earthquake engineering
- Workplaces: Stanford University
- Doctoral advisor: Vitelmo V. Bertero

Helmut Krawinkler (April 6, 1940 – April 16, 2012) was an Austrian-born American structural engineer.

Krawinkler was a native of Innsbruck, Austria, born on April 6, 1940. He earned an undergraduate degree from the Vienna University of Technology in 1964. Krawinkler then earned an MS Civil Engineering with an emphasis in structural engineering at San Jose State University, funded by a Fulbright Scholarship between 1965 and 1967. In 1971, he graduated from the University of California, Berkeley with a doctorate and became an assistant research engineer at Berkeley. After a year as lecturer at San Jose State University, Krawinkler joined the Stanford University faculty in 1973.

He directed the Blume Earthquake Engineering Center from 1985 to 1995. He was appointed John A. Blume Professor within the Department of Civil and Environmental Engineering in 1991. Krawinkler was granted emeritus status in 2007. He was elected to the United States National Academy of Engineering in 2012 "for development of performance-based earthquake engineering procedures for evaluating and rehabilitating buildings."

That same year, Krawinkler was diagnosed with a brain tumor that necessitated surgery performed in February 2012. He died in Palo Alto, California, on April 16, 2012, while seeking further treatment.
