= Keisuke Hayashi =

Japanese footballer

Personal information
- Date of birth: July 25, 1988 (age 38)
- Place of birth: Sanda, Hyōgo, Japan
- Height: 1.65 m (5 ft 5 in)
- Position: Defender

Team information
- Current team: Sutherland Sharks

Youth career
- 2004–2006: Vissel Kobe
- 2007–2010: Doshisha University

Senior career*
Years	Team	Apps	(Gls)
2011–2013	Vissel Kobe	7	(0)
2014	Gainare Tottori	20	(0)
2015–2018	Nara Club	69	(1)
2018–	Sutherland Sharks	22	(0)
- * Club domestic league appearances and goals as of 16 August 2018

Keisuke Hayashi (林 佳祐, Hayashi Keisuke; born July 25, 1988) is a Japanese football player. He plays for the Australian club Sutherland Sharks.

== Career statistics ==
Updated to 20 February 2017.

Appearances and goals by club, season and competition
Club	Season	League			Emperor's Cup		J.League Cup		Total	
Club	Season	Division	Apps	Goals	Apps	Goals	Apps	Goals	Apps	Goals
Vissel Kobe	2011	J1 League	2	0	0	0	0	0	2	0
Vissel Kobe	2012	J1 League	0	0	0	0	3	0	3	0
Vissel Kobe	2013	J2 League	5	0	1	0	–		6	0
Gainare Tottori	2014	J3 League	19	0	0	0	–		19	0
Nara Club	2015	JFL	22	0	1	0	–		23	0
Nara Club	2016	JFL	18	1	2	0	–		20	1
Career total			66	1	4	0	3	0	73	1
