= Lin Di =

Chinese singer

Lin Di with pipa

Lin Di (Chinese: 林笛; pinyin: Lín Dí; born 1975 in Shanghai) is a Chinese musician, composer, and vocalist.

Her current band is Cold Fairyland, a progressive rock band in which she plays pipa and keyboard synthesizers, and also sings.

Lin began playing pipa at the age of four. She studied at the Shanghai Conservatory of Music where she majored in traditional Chinese music and pipa. In 2001, she started her own band, Cold Fairyland, with bass guitarist Su Yong, and composed original music for various commercial projects and orchestral works. She performs occasionally with the Shanghai-based band Swing Shine.

Lin is also an avid photographer.

== Discography ==
=== Solo albums ===
- Ten Days In Magic Land (魔境十日) by Lin Di - 2002
- Bride in Legend (迷路新娘) by Lin Di - 2004
- Meet in Secret Garden by Miyadudu - 2009
- The Gossypium Era by Lin Di - 2011
- Buddhist Scriptures by Lin Di - 2012
- The One Tree Forest by Lin Di - 2021

=== With Swing Shine ===
- Marguerite - 2011
- Rootless Clouds - 2013

=== With Cold Fairyland ===
- Flying Over the City (在城市上空飞翔) (demo) - 2001
- Kingdom of Benevolent Strangers (陌生仙子国) - 2003
- Cold Fairyland 2005 Live (冷酷仙境 2005现场) - 2006
- Seeds on the Ground (地上的种子) - 2007

== Awards ==
- 2008 Shanghai City Weekend Magazine, Bar and Restaurant Awards, Editor's Pick - "The Best Locally Based Band"
- 2009 China Music Awards - "Strength For New Life" Award
