= Moritaka Hayashi =

Dr. Moritaka Hayashi is an international lawyer, scholar and author, who is widely considered a leading expert on the impact of human activity on the world's oceans. Over a period of nearly 40 years, he has published extensively on issues involving the law of the sea, including overfishing, maritime shipping and maritime security. In 2008, he served on an international commission that generated controversy by calling for the immediate suspension of bluefin tuna fishing in the Eastern Atlantic Ocean and Mediterranean Sea. He has also served as an official at the United Nations and as a diplomat for the Permanent Mission of Japan to the United Nations.

== Background ==
Dr. Hayashi began his international legal career in 1971 as an officer at the United Nations. Starting in 1980, he worked as a diplomat at the Permanent Mission of Japan to the United Nations rising to the position of Minister. In 1989, he returned to the United Nations to serve as Principal Officer, and subsequently as Director of its Division for Ocean Affairs and the Law of the Sea. In 1996, Dr. Hayashi began serving as the Head of the Fisheries Department within the United Nations' Food and Agriculture Organization. In 1999, he joined Waseda University in Tokyo, Japan, to teach various courses including international law of the sea and international environmental law. He has served on the International Commission on Shipping and an independent panel appointed by the International Commission for the Conservation of Atlantic Tunas. He lectures and actively participates in legal conferences worldwide such as the International Conference on Joint Development and the South China Sea held by the National University of Singapore's Centre for International Law in June 2011 and a Law of the Sea Institute Conference at the University of Wollongong, Australia in November and December 2011.

== Role in bluefin tuna debate ==
By its own description, the International Commission for the Conservation of Atlantic Tunas (ICCAT), is an "inter-governmental fishery organization responsible for the conservation of tunas and tuna-like species in the Atlantic Ocean and its adjacent seas." In 2008, responding to concerns raised by the international community, ICCAT appointed an independent panel to review its own performance. Dr. Hayashi served as a member of this panel.

The report criticized the performance of ICCAT noting that the performance by ICCAT's members in managing bluefin tuna fisheries in the Eastern Atlantic and Mediterranean is "widely regarded as an international disgrace" and "a travesty in fisheries management." Indicating that the collapse of the bluefin tuna stock in those areas "could be a real possibility in the foreseeable future," the panel recommended that fishing on bluefin tuna be suspended until ICCAT's members agree to abide by certain recommendations and international law.

The report attracted the support of several major advocacy groups. For example, World Wide Fund for Nature (formerly, World Wildlife Fund) embraced the report and called the fishery "grossly out of control." Greenpeace indicated that it "believes that EU and Mediterranean fishing countries should bear the brunt of the criticism for having taken bluefin to the brink of collapse, adding that the countries have placed again and again the short term financial gain ahead of the long-term survival of the species and of the livelihood of fishermen that depend on it." ICCAT indicated that, in response to the report, it reviewed the compliance record of each country with a particular focus on eastern bluefin tuna. As of November 2010, however, ICCAT has not agreed to suspend fishing on bluefin tuna.

Dr. Hayashi has long stressed the need for an increase in international cooperation and political will to control the potential devastation generated by market demand. In an interview in 1997, Dr. Hayashi commented: "Looking at the issue of overfishing, for example, history shows that therein lies the road to overcapitalization in industrial fisheries and excessive pressure in the case of small-scale fisheries and a headlong chase in pursuit of greater harvests. This has led to the collapse of some fisheries and fish stocks."

== Selected publications ==
- "Islands' Sea Areas: Effects of a Rising Sea Level," Review of Island Studies (OPRF Center of Island Studies Pub. 2013) (translated from "Shima no kaiiki to kaimen jōshō," Tōsho Kenkyū Journal, Vol. 2 No. 1, Oct. 2012, pp. 74–87).
- "Sea level rise and the law of the sea: How can the affected States be better protected?" presented at the "Law of the Sea Institute Conference - The Limits of Maritime Jurisdiction" hosted at the University of Wollongong, Australia, November 28, 2011 through December 2, 2011.
- "Sea-Level Rise and the Law of the Sea: Future Options," in Davor Vidas and Peter Johan Schei, eds. The World Ocean in Globalisation: Climate Change, Sustainable Fisheries, Biodiversity, Shipping, Regional Issues (Brill; M. Nijhoff Pub. 2011).
- "Japan: Anti-Piracy Law," International Journal of Marine and Coastal Law, vol. 25 (2010), pp. 143–149.
- "International Measures to Combat Illegal, Unreported and Unregulated (IUU) Fishing and Japan, " Japanese Yearbook of International Law, vol. 51 (2008), pp. 57–75.
- "Regional Fisheries Management Organizations and Non-Members," in Tafsir Malick Ndjaye and Rüdiger Wolfrum, eds. Law of the Sea, Environmental Law and Settlement of Disputes. Liber Amicorum Judge Thomas A. Mensah (Leiden/Boston: M. Nijhoff Pub. 2007), pp. 751–765
- "Regional Fisheries Management in the East China Sea," in M. Nordquist, J. N. Moore and Kuen-chen Fu, eds., Recent Developments in the Law of the sea and China (Leiden/Boston: M. Nijhoff Pub. 2006), pp. 219–237
- "Military and Intelligence Gathering Activities in the EEZ: Definition of Key Terms," Marine Policy, vol. 29, no. 2 (2005), pp. 123–137
- "Jurisdiction over Foreign Commercial Ships in Ports: A Gap in the Law of the Sea Codification," Ocean Yearbook, vol. 18 (2004), pp. 488–511
- "Illegal, Unreported, and Unregulated (IUU) Fishing: Global and Regional Responses," in D. Caron and H. Scheiber, eds., Bringing New Law to Ocean Waters (Leiden/Boston: M. Nijhoff Publishers, 2004), pp. 95–123
- "Global Governance of Deep-Sea Fisheries," International Journal of Marine and Coastal Law, vol. 19, no. 3 (2004), pp. 289–298
- "Three Decades' Progress in High Seas Fisheries Governance: Towards a Common Heritage Regime?" in M. Nordquist, et al. eds., The Stockholm Declaration and Law of the Marine Environment (Leiden/Boston: M. Nijhoff Publishers, 2003), pp. 375–397
- "High Seas Fisheries Governance: Recent Trends and Issues in the Asia-Pacific Region," in N. Azimi, M. Fuller and H. Nakayama, eds., Sea and Human Security: Proceedings of an International Conference, Hiroshima, March 2002 (University of Texas at Austin, 2002)
- "Toward the Elimination of Substandard Shipping: The Report of the International Commission on Shipping," International Journal of Marine and Coastal Law, vol. 16, no. 3 (2001), pp. 501–513
- "The 1995 Agreement on the Conservation and Management of Straddling and Highly Migratory Fish Stocks: Significance for the Law of the Sea Convention," in H. Caminos, ed. Law of the Sea (Aldershot: Ashgate Pub. Co., 2001), pp. 301–319
- "The Problem of Substandard Shipping: Towards Responsible Flag States," in D. Johnston and A. Sirivivatnanon, eds., Ocean Governance and Sustainable Development in the Pacific Region. Selected papers, Commentaries and Comments Presented to the SEAPOL Inter-Regional Conference, Bangkok, 21–23 March 2001, pp. 241–252
- "The Southern Bluefin Tuna Cases: Prescription of Provisional Measures by the International Tribunal for the Law of the Sea," Tulane Environmental Law Journal, vol. 13, no. 2 (2000), pp. 361–385
- "Division of the Oceans and Ecosystem Management: A Contrastive Spatial Evolution of Marine Fisheries Governance," Ocean and Coastal Management, vol. 43, no. 6 (2000) (with S. M. Garcia), pp. 445–474
- "The 1995 UN Fish Stocks Agreement and the Law of the Sea," in D. Vidas and W. Ostreng, eds., Order for the Oceans at the Turn of the Century (The Hague/London/Boston: Kluwer Law International, 1999), pp. 37–53
- "The Straddling and Highly Migratory Fish Stocks Agreement," in E. Hey, ed., Developments in International Fisheries Law (The Hague/London/Boston: Kluwer Law International, 1999), pp. 55–83
- "The 1994 Agreement for the Universalization of the Law of the Sea Convention," Ocean Development and International Law, vol. 27 (1996), pp. 31–39
- "Enforcement by non-flag states on the high seas under the 1995 Agreement on Straddling and Highly Migratory Fish Stocks," Georgetown International Environmental Law Review, vol. 9, issue 1 (1996), pp. 1–36
- "Archaeological and historical objects under the United Nations Convention on the Law of the Sea," Marine Policy, vol. 20, no. 4 (1996), pp. 291–296
- Roy Lee and Moritaka Hayashi, eds., New Directions in the Law of the Sea: Global Developments (3 vol. loose-leaf pub. from Oceana Publications, New York, since 1995)
- Roy Lee and Moritaka Hayashi, eds., New Directions in the Law of the Sea: Regional and National Developments (3 vol. loose-leaf pub. from Oceana Publications, New York, since 1995)
- "The role of the United Nations in managing the world's fisheries," in Gerald Blake, et at., eds., The Peaceful Management of Transboundary Resources (London/Dordrecht/Boston: Trotman/M.Nijhoff, 1995), pp. 373–393
- "The 1995 Agreement on Straddling Fish Stocks and Highly Migratory Fish Stocks: Significance for the Law of the Sea Convention," Ocean and Coastal Management, vol. 29 (1995), pp. 51–69
- "The role of the Secretary-General under the Law of the Sea Convention and the Part XI Agreement," International Journal of Marine and Coastal Law, vol. 10, no. 2 (1995), pp. 157–164
- "Prospects for Universal Acceptance of the Part XI Agreement," Georgetown International Environmental Law Review, vol. 7, issue 3 (1995), pp. 687–695
- "Effect of the entry into force of the United Nations Convention on the Law of the Sea on the oceans and coastal areas," in SEAPOL Singapore Conference on Sustainable Development of Coastal and Ocean Areas in Southeast Asia : Post-Rio Perspectives (National University of Singapore, 1995), pp. 59–85
- "United Nations Conference on Straddling Fish Stocks and Highly Migratory Fish Stocks: An Analysis of the 1993 Sessions," Ocean Yearbook, vol. 11 (1994), pp. 20–45
- "UNCLOS Part XI Agreement, with Particular Reference to the Status of Registered Pioneer Investors," in International Advisory Conference on Deep Seabed Mining Policy (KORDI, Seoul, 1994)
- "Regulation of Land-based Marine Pollution," in J. Hickey and L. Longmire, eds., The Environment: Global Problems, Local Actions (Westport, Conn.: Greenwood Press, 1994), pp. 171–179
- "The management of transboundary fish stocks under the Law of the Sea Convention," International Journal of Marine and Coastal Law, vol. 8, no. 2 (1993), pp. 245–261
- "The Oceans Agenda at the UNCED Process: a UN/DOALOS Perspective," in M. Nordquist, ed., National Policy and the Oceans: Sixteenth Annual Seminar of the Center for Oceans Law and Policy, University of Virginia School of Law (Charlottesville, Va. 1993), pp. 179–183
- "The 1988 IMO Convention on the Suppression of Maritime Terrorism," in Henry Han, ed., Terrorism and Political Violence: Limits and Possibilities of Legal Control (New York: Oceana Publications, 1993), pp. 225–240
- "The role of national jurisdictional zones in ocean management," in Paolo Fabbri, ed., Ocean Management in Global Change (London/New York: Elsevier, 1992), pp. 209–225
- "Fisheries in the North Pacific: Japan at a Turning Point," Ocean Development and International Law, vol. 22, no. 4 (1991), pp. 343–364
- "The Obligations of the Registered Pioneer Investors: Toward a New Understanding at the Law of the Sea Preparatory Commission," Ocean and Shoreline Management, vol. 14, no. 4 (1990), pp. 273–292
- "Registration of the first group of pioneer investors by the Preparatory Commission for the Law of the Sea Convention," Ocean Development and International Law, vol. 20, no. 1 (1989), pp. 1–33
- "The dispute settlement clause of the 1986 Vienna Convention on the Law of Treaties," New York University Journal of International Law and Politics, vol. 19, no. 2 (1987), pp. 327–356
- "The Antarctica question in the United Nations," Cornell International Law Journal, vol. 19, no. 2 (1986), pp. 275–290
- "Japan and deep seabed mining," Ocean Development and International Law, vol. 17, no. 4 (1986), pp. 351–365
- "Strengthening the principle of the peaceful settlement of disputes: United Nations efforts and Japan," Japanese Annual of International Law, no. 27 (1984), pp. 27–51
- "Comparative National Legislation on Offshore Pollution," Syracuse Journal of International Law and Commerce, vol. 1, no. 2 (1973), pp. 250–256
- "An International Machinery for the Management of the Seabed: Birth and Growth of the Idea," Annals of International Studies (Geneva), no. 4 (1973), pp. 251–279
- "Soviet policy on the regulation of high sea fisheries," Cornell International Law Journal, vol. 5, no. 2 (1972), pp. 131–160
