= Lin Kegong =

Lin Kegong (Chinese: 林克恭; Wade–Giles: Lin K'e-kung; 1901 – 1992) was a Taiwanese modern artist.

== Biography ==
Lin was born in Banqiao during the period of Japanese rule in Taiwan, into the Lin Ben Yuan Family. He was first educated in Hong Kong's St Stephen's College. From 1921 to 1925, he attended Cambridge University to study law and economics, where he found that he had an interest in art. He joined the Cambridge Arts Society while simultaneously taking alternative courses in the Cambridge Arts College. During his summer vacation, he attended St John's Service Arts College to further pursue his interest in art. Upon graduating with a Bachelor's degree in 1925, he was admitted to the David Slade Arts College at the University of London. In the same year, his artistic works were accepted to the Royal Academy Exhibition in the U.K.

In 1931, Lin returned to Taiwan to hold his own exhibition. Afterwards, some of his works, including “The Naked Body” and “The Beauty Under the Moon” were selected to be part of the 5th and 6th section of the Taiwan Arts Exhibition. In 1937, he was appointed as the headmaster of the Arts College. In 1949, Lin Kegong returned to Taiwan via Hong Kong. At Liang Dingming's invitation, Lin began his teaching career in the Arts College of Political Warfare School in 1956. In 1973, he became a member of the jury at the São Paulo Art Biennial and in 1991, he received the Achievement Reward in the category of Culture and Arts from the Council for Cultural Affairs.

== Style ==
Lin considered music to be an important part of creation. A substantial portion of Lin's works were inspired by his careful observation on the nature and his personal understanding of the relationship between nature and personal life. His approach to brushwork bore similarities to Chinese painting, emphasizing the background. Before drawing the whole composition, he typically sketched out the background, which allowed him to complete the structure of the work as a whole.

== Works ==
Lin Kegong's “The Countryside in the UK” is his earliest extant painting. The piece depicts a river in Bristow, UK and the attic scenery of a European building. Attracted by the light's reflection by the river, Lin Kegong used the perspective line disappearance method to show both the immediate and distant views. He also used the size of the crossing waterway and bridge to convey the actual distances. In this work, the leveling method was applied, as in watercolor painting.

== See also ==
- Taiwanese art

== Sources ==
- Commercial Press. 2012. "Dictionary of Taiwanese History - Lin." http://nrch.cca.gov.tw/ccahome/website/site20/contents/008/cca220003-li-wpkbhisdict001525-0476-u.xml (accessed 4 10, 2013).
- Encyclopedia of Taiwan. 2010. "Lin Kegung." (accessed 4 10, 2013)
- Kegong, Lin. 2012."Taiwan Teacher." https://web.archive.org/web/20070823095452/http://www.taiwanteacher.tw/utt_cd1/e16.htm (accessed 4 5, 2013).
- Taiwan Art Museum. 2012 "Taiwanese Artists - Linkegong." .http://over.tngs.tn.edu.tw/arts/arts-004/arts-004-016/arts-004-016.htm (accessed 4 7, 2013).
- 視覺素養學習網. "林克恭". http://vr.theatre.ntu.edu.tw/fineart/painter-tw/limkackeong/limkackeong.htm (accessed 4 12, 2013)
- "LIM KAC KEONG (1901-1992)". Taiwan Digital Gallery.
