= Lin Shu-chen =

Taiwanese politician

- 林淑真

Administrative Deputy Minister of Education of the Republic of China
- In office 22 October 2013 – 20 May 2016
- Minister: Chiang Wei-ling
- Preceded by: Chen Der-hwa
- Succeeded by: Lin Teng-chiao

Personal details
- Education: National Taiwan University

Lin Shu-chen (Chinese: 林淑真; pinyin: Lín Shúzhēn; Wade–Giles: Lin^{2} Shu^{2}-chen^{1}) is a Taiwanese politician. She was the Administrative Deputy Minister of Education from 22 October 2013 until 20 May 2016.
