= A-FÜ =

Taiwanese singer and songwriter (born 1987)

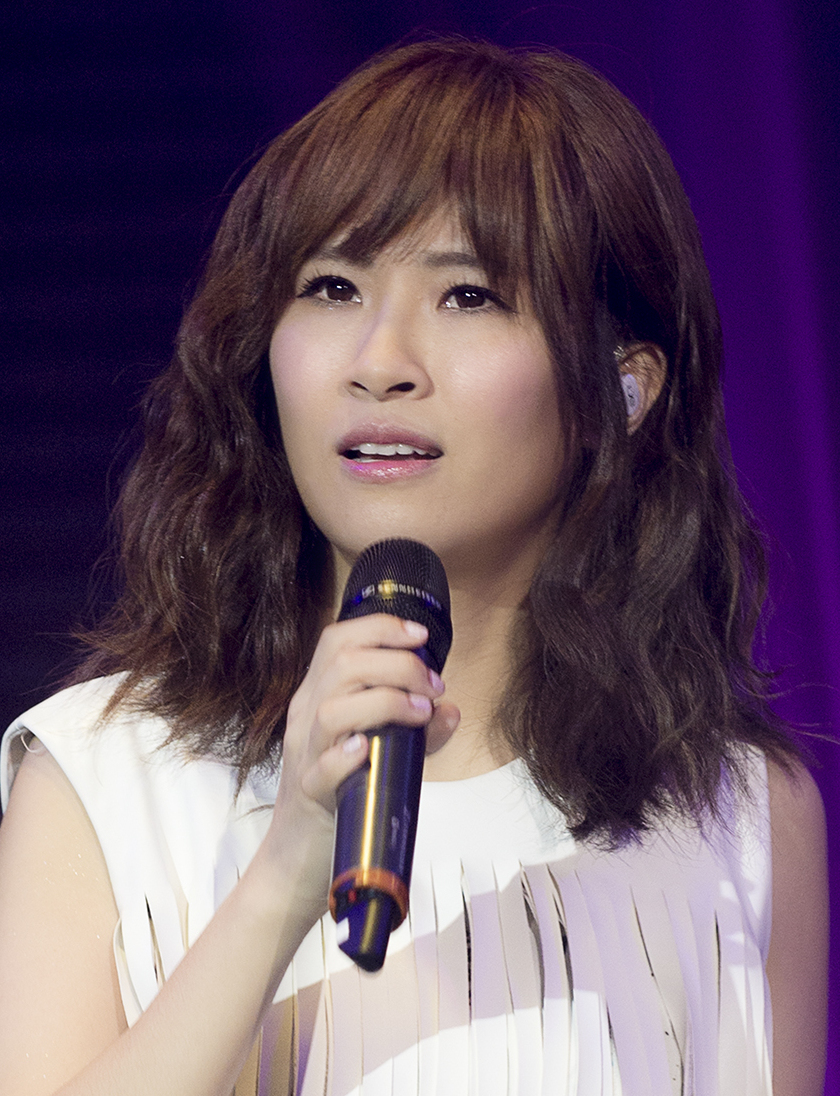
- A-FÜ in 2015
- Born: Teng Fu-ju; 20 June 1987 (age 39); Hsinchu, Taiwan
- Education: Shih Hsin University
- Occupations: Singer; songwriter
- Years active: 2007–present
- Spouse: How How (m. 2019)
- Children: 1

Chinese name
- Traditional Chinese: 鄧福如
- Simplified Chinese: 邓福如
Transcriptions
Standard Mandarin
- Hanyu Pinyin: Dèng Fúrú
- Musical career
- Also known as: A-FÜ Teng, Deng Furu
- Genres: Mandopop; indie pop; R&B
- Instruments: Vocals
- Label: Forward Music
- Formerly of: Lazy Bomb

Teng Fu-ju (traditional Chinese: 鄧福如; simplified Chinese: 邓福如; pinyin: Dèng Fúrú; born 20 June 1987), known by her stage name A-FÜ (Chinese: 阿福; pinyin: Ā fú), is a Taiwanese singer and songwriter. Prior to her solo debut in the music scene, A-FÜ was a member of Lazy Bomb, an indie band, and a demo singer. She is known for her cover version of "Nothin' on You" by B.o.B and Bruno Mars, which drew wide attention on YouTube in 2010. In May 2011, A-FÜ released her debut studio album, That's How It Is, for which she received a nomination for Best New Artist at the 23rd Golden Melody Awards.

== Early life ==
Born in Hsinchu City on 20 June 1987, A-FÜ grew up in the countryside in Xiangshan District and in Changhua County. Both her parents run a rental car business together, and as they were often busy with work when she was young, A-FÜ and her elder sister, Hsing Ju, spent much of their childhood under the care of their aunt. Despite this, A-FÜ still maintains a close relationship with her mother and grew up influenced by her mother's love for music, in particular songs by Teresa Teng. At a young age, A-FÜ entered in singing and recitation competitions. Also, at her mother's request, she learned the standard Mandarin enunciation by watching the Taiwanese educational programme The Daily Characters (每日一字) hosted by news presenter Lee Yen-chiu, which perhaps, has shaped her distinctive vocals, in a way.

She attended Kuang-Fu High School, a comprehensive high school in Hsinchu, and graduated from Shih Hsin University with a degree in public relations and advertising in 2010.

== Career ==
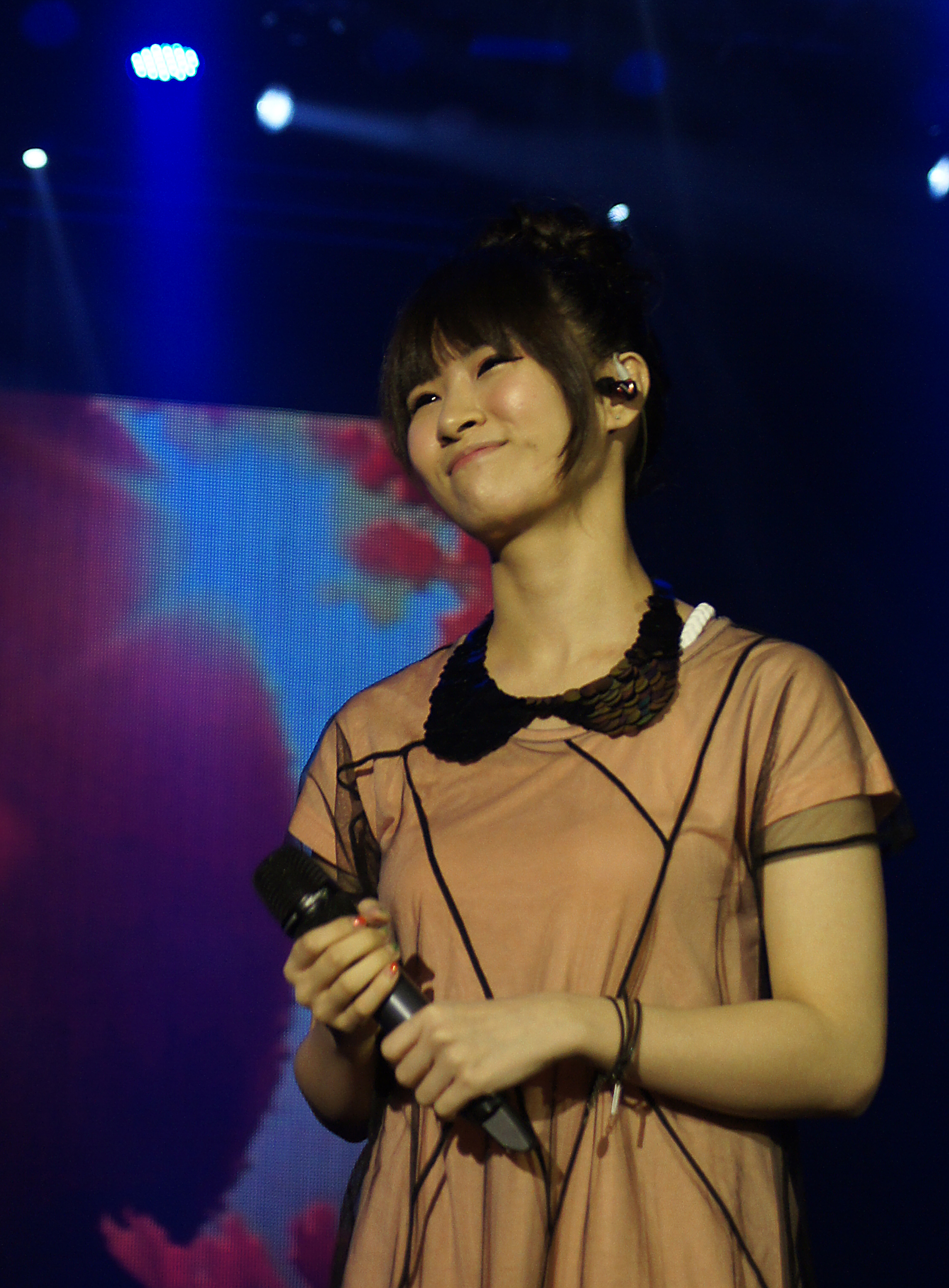
A-FÜ in 2013

During her college years, A-FÜ was the lead singer of an indie band called Lazy Bomb. The band released a self-titled EP in November 2007 and disbanded shortly after. Around this time, A-FÜ met music producer AL (何官錠), who is also a member and keyboard player of the pop rock band Six Plus (六甲樂團). She started collaborating with AL as a demo singer. The first demo which she recorded, titled "Sheng Sheng Man" (聲聲慢), was chosen as the ending theme song for the first season of the Chinese TV series Justice Bao. The Zhong guo feng music style of the song, coupled with A-FÜ's crystal-clear voice and diction, generated considerable buzz among the Chinese netizens. Soon after, A-FÜ's singing caught the attention of veteran host Chang Hsiao-yen, who later signed A-FÜ to her record label Forward Music. While awaiting the release of her debut album, A-FÜ garnered media attention after uploading her first video on YouTube in September 2010, her cover version of B.o.B and Bruno Mars's "Nothin' on You", which had racked up more than a million views within a week. She followed with more covers of popular hits, which includes "Bizarre Love Triangle", "Qing Hua Ci" (青花瓷) by Jay Chou, Bruno Mars's "Just the Way You Are" and so forth. In December 2010, A-FÜ was featured as a backup singer during Stella Chang's comeback concert in Taiwan.

A-FÜ's debut album, That's How It Is, was released on 27 May 2011 and features a studio version of "Sheng Sheng Man" and her cover of "Nothin' on You". The album sold more than 25,000 copies in Taiwan within a month of its release. To further promote the album, A-FÜ performed a sold-out show at the Riverside Live House in Taipei on 25 June 2011, with Van Fan appearing as guest performer. On 3 July 2011, A-FÜ made a guest appearance at Jam Hsiao's mini-concert at Tamsui Fisherman's Wharf, performing "Just the Way You Are" and "Wei Tian Ci" (未填詞). In 2012, A-FÜ was nominated for Best New Artist at the 23rd Golden Melody Awards but lost to Ilid Kaolo.

Her next release, an extended play titled Happiness Is Around Us, was released on 7 March 2012. The second single off of the album, "Where Is The Love?", a self-composed track, was featured as an insert song in the drama series Big Red Riding Hood.

On 7 June 2013, A-FÜ released her second studio album, Sky Island, which debuted at number one on the Five Music Mandarin Album sales chart. It includes the track "Rang Wo Ai Shang Wo" (讓我愛上我) from the soundtrack album for the film Step Back to Glory (志氣). In May of that year, A-FÜ performed "Tie a Yellow Ribbon Round the Old Oak Tree" at Teresa Teng's memorial concert at Taipei Arena.

Her third studio album, Own Categories, was released on 19 June 2015. It features a duet, "Stop at the Crossing Ahead" (前面路口停), with Xiao Yu.

== Personal life ==
In January 2016, it was revealed that A-FÜ and YouTuber How How (Chen Tzu-hao) were in a relationship. The couple registered their marriage on 14 February 2019, and held their wedding ceremony in June the same year. Their son was born in January 2021.

In early April 2021, A-FÜ was accused of causing the breakup of the marriage of a manicurist and her husband, and also resulting in the manicurist's miscarriage. A-FÜ and her husband How How broke their silence on the accusation a week later, denying it and also revealing that they have engaged a lawyer to handle the allegations.

== Discography ==
=== Studio albums ===
Album#	English title	Mandarin title	Release date	Track listing	Label
1st	That's How It Is	原來如此！！	27 May 2011	Track listing: 1. 未填詞 (Wèi tián cí); 2. 如果有如果 (Rú guǒ yǒu rú guǒ); 3. 一點點喜歡 (feat. Suffa受罪) (Yì diǎn diǎn xǐ huan); 4. 你好嗎 天氣好嗎 (Nǐ hǎo mǎ tiān qì hǎo mǎ); 5. 聲聲慢 (Shēng shēng màn); 6. 星空戀曲 (Xīng kōng liàn qū); 7. 許你向我看 (feat. Huang Lei) (Xǔ nǐ xiàng wǒ kàn); 8. 福爾摩斯 (Fú ěr mó sī); 9. 起飛 (Qǐ fēi); 10. Let Go; 11. Nothing On You	Forward Music
2nd	Sky Island	天空島	7 June 2013	Track listing: 1. 無限度自由 (Wú xiàn dù zì yóu); 2. 完美情人 (Wán měi qíng rén); 3. 天使 (Tiān shǐ); 4. Me & U 5. 良人 (Liáng rén); 6. Star; 7. 越來越愛 (Yuè lái yuè ài); 8. 不要放棄 (Bú yào fàng qì); 9. Fantasy Paradise; 10. 讓我愛上我 (Ràng wǒ ài shàng wǒ)	Forward Music
3rd	Own Categories	自成一派	19 June 2015	Track listing: 1. Refresh; 2. 自成一派 (Zì chéng yī pài); 3. 前面路口停 (feat. Xiao Yu) (Qián miàn lù kǒu tíng); 4. 鄧大福是一隻貓 (Dèng dà fú shì yì zhī māo); 5. 輸給時間 (Shū gěi shí jiān); 6. 黑羊 (Hēi yáng); 7. Survive; 8. 數羊 (Shǔ yáng); 9. 藍色是最溫暖的顏色 (Lán sè shì zuì wēn nuǎn de yán sè); 10. 超級豬頭 (Chāo jí zhū tóu); 11. 女兒心如水 (Nǚ ér xīn rú shuǐ)	Forward Music

=== Extended play ===
Album#	English title	Mandarin title	Release date	Track listing	Label
1st	Happiness Is Around Us	你好，哈波尼斯	7 March 2012	Track listing: 1. All Happy; 2. Where Is The Love?; 3. Track 3 (interlude); 4. Thank You (Demo Version)	Forward Music

=== Singles ===
English title	Chinese title	Release date
"Love You Blue" (with Chang and Lee)	愛你我不魯	April 2018
"Sweetheart" (with Any.C)	—N/a	December 2018
"Same Love"	我們的星球眼淚不超過三秒	March 2020
"Tian Zhen Kuai Le"	天真快樂	May 2020
"A Memory"	能不能想起我	November 2020
"Hamburger"	漢堡包	January 2021
"Yi Shou Ting Le Hui Dian Tou De Ge"	一首聽了會點頭的歌	January 2021

== Awards and nominations ==
Year	Award	Category	Nomination	Result	Ref
2011	Hong Kong TVB JSG Selections 2011 (Part 2)	Most Popular Mandarin Song	"未填詞"	Won	
2011	Yahoo! Taiwan Celebrity Awards	Most Popular New Artiste	—N/a	Won	
2011	Hong Kong TVB8 Awards	Best New Artiste (silver)	—N/a	Won	
2011	Hong Kong TVB8 Awards	Best Music Composition	"如果有如果"	Won	
2011	One FM Top 30 Awards	Top 30 Hits	"如果有如果"	Won	
2011	One FM Top 30 Awards	Top 10 Album	That's How It Is	Won	
2011	Singapore Hit Awards	Best New Artiste	—N/a	Nominated	
2011	Singapore Hit Awards	Most Popular Newcomer	—N/a	Nominated	
2012	23rd Golden Melody Awards	Best New Artist	—N/a	Nominated	
2012	Canadian Chinese Pop Music Awards	Mandarin New Female Artiste Award	—N/a	Won	
2012	Canadian Chinese Pop Music Awards	Top 10 Mandarin songs	"一點點喜歡"	Won	
2012	KKBOX	Newcomer of the Year	—N/a	Won	
2012	Music Radio Awards	Most Potential New Artiste (Hong Kong / Taiwan)	—N/a	Won	
2012	Music Radio Awards	Most Popular New Artiste (Hong Kong / Taiwan)	—N/a	Nominated	
2012	Metro Radio Mandarin Hits Music Awards	Popular Idol Award	—N/a	Won	
2012	Metro Radio Mandarin Hits Music Awards	Singer-songwriter Award	—N/a	Won	
2012	Books 博客來	Top-selling album of the year (9th)	That's How It Is	Won	
2013	Metro Radio Mandarin Hits Music Awards	Songs of the Year	"Me & U"	Won	
2013	Metro Radio Mandarin Hits Music Awards	Best Female Artiste	—N/a	Won	
