= Hsuan Chuang University =

University in Hsinchu City, Taiwan

Coordinates: 24.7759°N 120.9437°E

- 玄奘大學
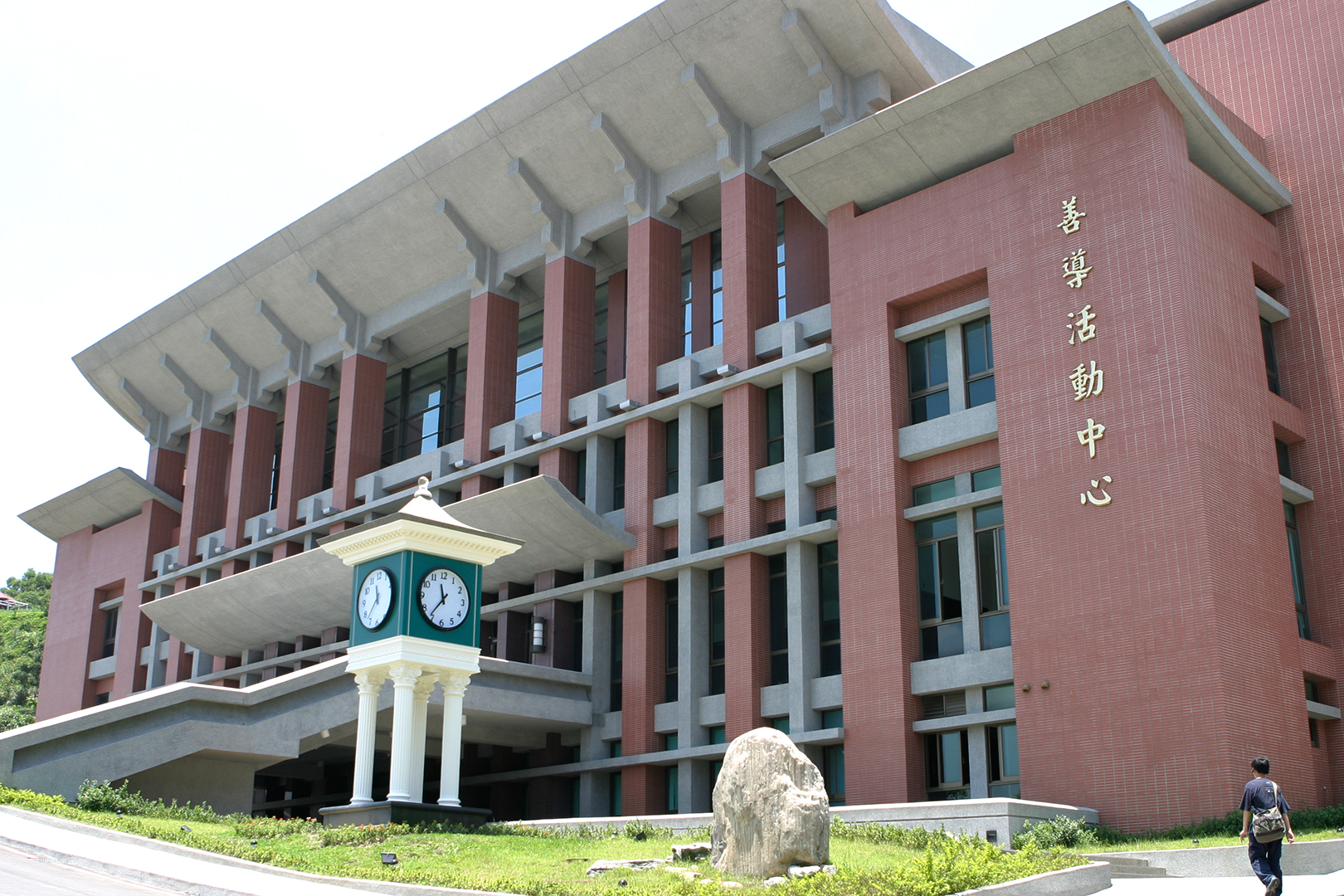
- Motto: 德智勤毅(Pe̍h-ōe-jī: Tek-tì Khîn-gē)
- Motto in English: Virtue, Knowledge, Diligence and Perseverance
- Type: Private
- Established: 1997
- Religious affiliation: Buddhist
- Academic staff: 158
- Undergraduates: 5,882
- Postgraduates: 791
- Location: Xiangshan, Hsinchu City, Taiwan
- Campus: Suburb
- Website: www.hcu.edu.tw

Hsuan Chuang University
- Traditional Chinese: 玄奘大學
- Simplified Chinese: 玄奘大学
Transcriptions
Standard Mandarin
- Hanyu Pinyin: Xuán Zhuǎng Dàxué
Southern Min
- Hokkien POJ: Hiân-chōng Tāi-ha̍k
- Tâi-lô: Hiân-tsōng Tāi-ha̍k

Hsuan Chuang University (HCU; Chinese: 玄奘大學; pinyin: Xuán Zhuǎng Dàxué; Pe̍h-ōe-jī: Hiân-chōng Tāi-ha̍k) is a private Buddhist university in Xiangshan District, Hsinchu City, Taiwan. Founded in 1997 by the Ven. Liao Zhong (了中; Pe̍h-ōe-jī: Liáu-tiong) and named for the Tang dynasty monk Xuanzang, the school was promoted to university status in 1993. It offers bachelor's and master's degrees, mainly in humanities subjects.

== History ==
Before 1985, the government of Taiwan maintained strict controls on private universities and, in particular, discouraged university-level religious education. For several decades, senior officials of the Buddhist Association of the Republic of China (BAROC) pressured the government to overturn these restrictions and allow a private Buddhist university similar to the Fu Jen Catholic University.

Informal resistance from the Ministry of Education persisted into the 1990s. One obstacle was that the Ministry of Education claimed that as a religious affair, jurisdiction over the proposal lay with the Ministry of the Interior—which, in turn, maintained that as an educational institution, responsibility lay with the Ministry of Education. Before 1990, the working group had reconciled itself to creating a technical college (which could be accredited) alongside an unaccredited seminary, in preparation for a time when the government might accredit it as a religious studies department.

The political thaw and economic boom of the 1980s and 1990s erased many of the obstacles facing the venture. However, these events also had the effect of encouraging charismatic Buddhist teachers to build their own organizations and institutions—including universities—separately from BAROC. Examples included Tzu Chi University, Fo Guang University, Huafan University, Nanhua University, and Dharma Drum Buddhist College). The "rump" project was led by Liao Zhong, a monk and BAROC official who would ultimately chair Hsuan Chuang's board of directors.

Hsinchu was chosen as the school's location for its proximity to the Buddhist teachers resident in north Taiwan and for its cheap land prices relative to Taipei. Government approval for the location was another significant hurdle in the application process. The school is in a semi-agricultural area on the outskirts of Hsinchu, next to Yuanpei University of Medical Technology and down the road from Chung Hua University. The prospect of a merger between these schools is regularly broached.

In 2008, the school was reevaluated by Taiwan's Ministry of Education, as a result of which one-third of its departments were placed on probation. Underlying this development is demographic pressure resulting from a dearth of university-age young people and a corresponding glut of colleges and universities (many of very marginal quality). In 2010 it was announced that HCU passed the re-evaluation (though several departments were closed) for the next five years.

== The name ==
A "contest" was held to decide the name of the new school, but none of the hundreds of entries were used.

One name favored by the working group was Chung Hua University, chosen for its lack of explicit Buddhist content. "Chung Hua" refers to Chinese culture and/or the Republic of China, but a (non-Buddhist) university project was discovered to be using this name. Xuanzang Technical College was another working name for the planned institution. The school finally opened under the name of Hsuan Chuang College of Humanities and Social Science (玄奘人文社會學院, Xuanzang Renwen Shehui Xueyuan). However, the name Hsuan Chuang University was in use well before government approval of its university status.

As spelled on all school signage, "Hsuan Chuang" follows the Wade-Giles phonetic standard that would equate to Pinyin Xuán Zhuǎng (but not zàng). The character in question, 奘, has two pronunciations, one associated with its "bound" form, and the other with its unbound and stative-verb form; they have slightly different ranges of denotations. As a result, there are, in effect, two phonetic "interpretations" of the name of the historical monk alluded to (i.e., Tang dynasty monk Xuanzang).

== Character ==
Although founded by Buddhists, Hsuan Chuang University is broadly indistinguishable from other lower-tier private universities in Taiwan. There are no religious requirements or restrictions (these would not be allowed by the Ministry of Education) and, except for a handful of monks and nuns, religion does not seem to be an important factor in attracting students.

It is indicative that the university (in April 2011) served meat to its students—indeed, there are no vegetarian options in the student dining hall. However, the religious studies program has an extensive set of courses on Buddhism, including specialized courses in

- Taiwanese Buddhism
- Sanskrit
- Taoism, Confucianism, and the major historical schools of Chinese Buddhist thought

== Books ==
Jones, Charles Brewer. Buddhism in Taiwan: A Historical Survey. Doctoral dissertation in Religious Studies, University of Virginia, 1996. See pp. 432–449 for history relevant to Hsuan Chuang University.
