= Sanxingqiao railway station =

Railway station located in Hsinchu City, Taiwan

Sanxingqiao Station 三姓橋車站
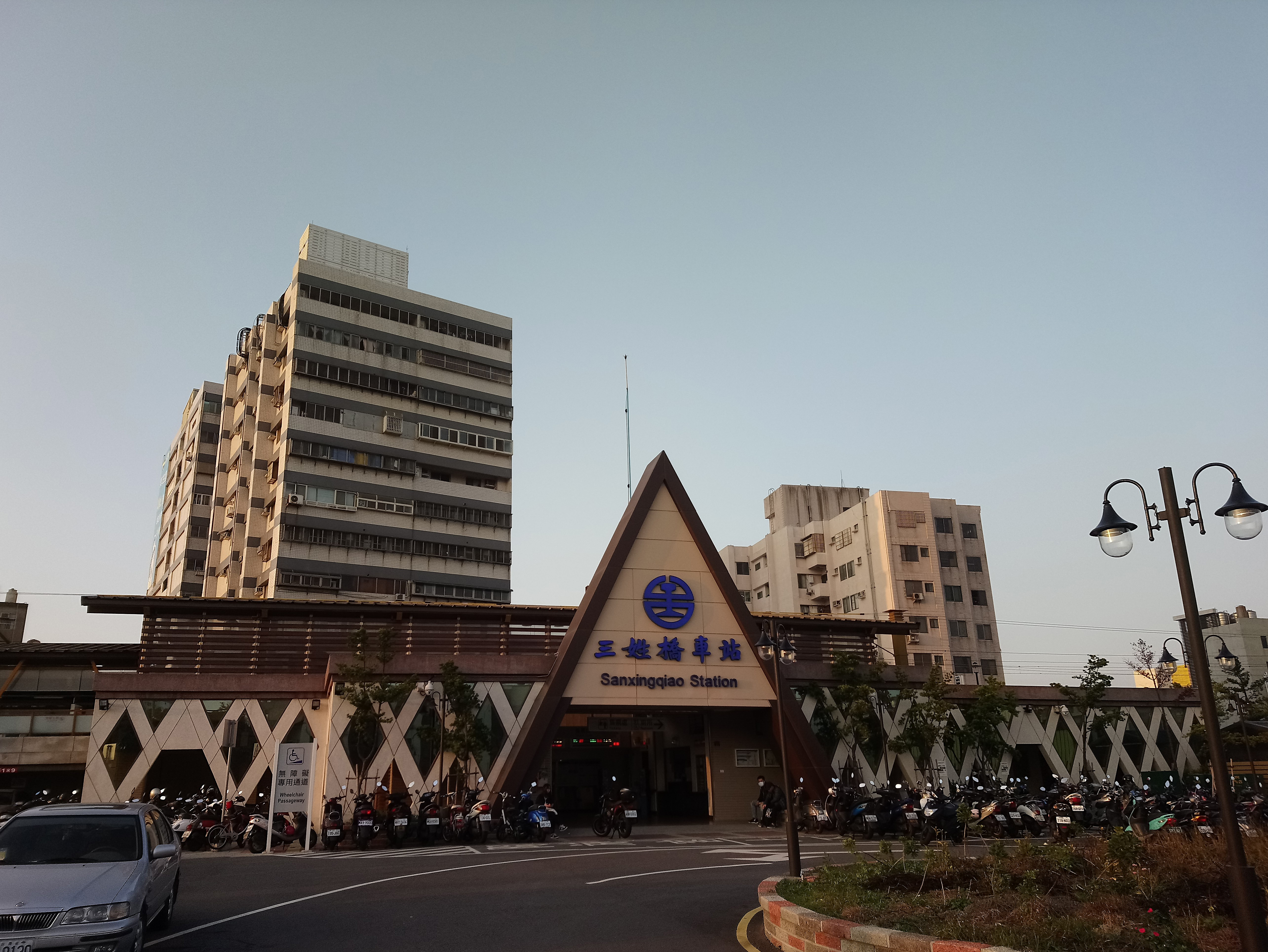
- Station entrance

Chinese name
- Traditional Chinese: 三姓橋車站
Transcriptions
Standard Mandarin
- Hanyu Pinyin: Sānxìngqiáo Chēzhàn
- Bopomofo: ㄙㄢ ㄒㄧㄥˋ ㄑㄧㄠˊ ㄔㄜ ㄓㄢˋ

General information
- Other names: South Hsinchu
- Location: Xiangshan, Hsinchu City; Taiwan
- Coordinates: 24°47′14.3″N 120°55′42.3″E
- System: Taiwan Railways railway station
- Line: West Coast line
- Distance: 111.2 km to Keelung
- Platforms: 2 side platforms

Construction
- Structure type: Elevated

Other information
- Station code: 273

History
- Opened: 29 June 2016

Passengers
- 2017: 353,103 per year

Services
Preceding station	Taiwan Railway	Following station
Hsinchu towards Keelung	Western Trunk line	Xiangshan towards Kaohsiung
Location

Sanxingqiao railway station (Chinese: 三姓橋車站; pinyin: Sānxìngqiáo Chēzhàn), previously known as South Hsinchu railway station (Chinese: 南新竹車站; pinyin: Nánxīnzhú Chēzhàn), is a railway station located in Xiangshan District, Hsinchu City, Taiwan. It is located on the West Coast line and is operated by Taiwan Railway.

== See also ==
- List of railway and metro stations in Taiwan
