= Lin Cheng-chieh =

Taiwanese politician (1952–2025)

Lin Cheng-chieh MLY
- 林正杰

Member of the Legislative Yuan
- In office 1 February 1990 – 31 January 1996
- Constituency: Taipei 2

Member of the Taipei City Council
- In office 25 December 1981 – September 1986

Personal details
- Born: 8 November 1952 Yunlin County, Taiwan
- Died: 3 June 2025 (aged 72) Taitung City, Taiwan
- Party: Democratic Progressive Party (1986–1991)
- Education: Tunghai University (BA); National Chengchi University (MA)

Lin Cheng-chieh (Chinese: 林正杰; pinyin: Lín Zhèngjié; Pe̍h-ōe-jī: Lîm Chèng-kia̍t; 8 November 1952 – 3 June 2025) was a Taiwanese politician. A tangwai activist for Taiwan's democratization, he helped found the Democratic Progressive Party. After leaving the DPP in 1991, he began supporting Pan-Blue Coalition political endeavors.

== Early life and education ==
Lin's father Lin Kwun-rung was a Kuomintang spy. The government sent him to China in 1956, where he was jailed until 1980. Following his release, Lin Kwan-rung spent three years at his ancestral home in Fujian until, with the help of his wife, he returned to Taiwan in 1983. Lin Cheng-chieh studied political science at Tunghai University, and attended graduate school at National Chengchi University.

== Political career ==
Lin was known as one of "three musketeers" of the tangwai movement, alongside Chen Shui-bian and Frank Hsieh. He ran as a tangwai candidate and won a seat on the Taipei City Council in 1981. Lin won reelection in 1985. The next year, the defendants involved in the Kaohsiung Incident began serving their prison sentences. Lin was credited with leading a protest calling for democratization, an action that became a catalyst for the establishment of the Democratic Progressive Party, of which Lin was a founding member. His leadership of this protest earned Lin another nickname, the "street bully." Months after the protest, Lin was stripped of his office upon being imprisoned in September on charges of libel. Lin accused Hu Yi-shou of financial impropriety. Alongside libel charges, Hu filed a second lawsuit against Lin, claiming that Lin had violated election law in his 1985 campaign. In February 1987, Lin's sentence was extended by eight months. Within the DPP, he led the Progress faction, a collective opposed to Taiwan independence. Lin left the DPP in June 1991, shortly after Fei Hsi-ping and Ju Gau-jeng, leading the party to radicalize and openly support Taiwan independence. After leaving the DPP, Lin told Alan M. Wachman in July 1991 that "[I]t is not necessarily the case that those who identify themselves as Taiwanese support Taiwan independence... I know a lot of socialists who support reunification. But they speak Taiwanese. They are not willing to speak Mandarin." Lin, who had been elected to the Legislative Yuan in 1989 under the DPP banner, served most of his first term and all of his second term as an independent, stepping down in 1996. In September 1993 Lin founded the New Parliament Magazine, a newsletter-like publication with a Pan-Blue editorial line. In 1994, Lin began a hunger strike as part of a larger protest in support of retaining a statue of Guanyin on the grounds of Daan Forest Park. Despite having left the Democratic Progressive Party, Lin served as deputy mayor of Hsinchu under fellow DPP founder James Tsai. Lin later became the chairman of the Chinese Unity Promotion Party.

In August 2006, Lin slapped and kicked Chin Heng-wei, editor of the magazine Contemporary Monthly, during a joint appearance on Formosa TV. He was widely criticized by Pan-Blue and Pan-Green political leaders. The Million Voices Against Corruption, President Chen Must Go campaign, a movement he had supported, forbid Lin from participating in a sit-in protest against Chen Shui-bian. However, Lin was permitted to attend a protest outside the Presidential Office led by the group in September. The Taipei District Prosecutors' Office charged Lin with inflicting bodily harm on Chin Heng-wei in October 2006, and Lin was eventually sentenced to a 50-day prison term. In August 2007, Lin and others were indicted for their actions during the Presidential Office protest. Despite the indictment, Lin continued small protests against Chen by founding the Nine Nine Association. In December, he led a gathering of thirty people to protest the renaming of Chiang Kai-shek Memorial Hall. When Chen stepped down from the presidency in 2008, Lin petitioned Chen's successor, Ma Ying-jeou, to bring corruption charges against Chen.

In the 2012 legislative election cycle, Lin ran as an independent candidate in Taitung. During the 2016 presidential election, Lin supported Hung Hsiu-chu's campaign. After Terry Gou lost the 2019 Kuomintang presidential primary, Lin left the party.

== Personal life and death ==
Lin was married to musician T. C. Yang. He later married Lin Feng-ying. Lin Cheng-chieh died at the Taitung branch of the Mackay Memorial Hospital, on 3 June 2025, at the age of 72. His family disclosed that Lin had adenocarcinoma of the lung for eight years.
