= Sean Huang (disambiguation) =

Sean Huang is an actor.

Sean Huang may also refer to:

- Sean Huang (musician)
- Sean Huang, bronze medallist at Floorball at the 2023 SEA Games
