= Lin Zhijian =

Lin Zhijian is a Chinese-language name, may refer to:

- Lin Chih-chien (林智堅, born 1975), Taiwanese politician
- Zhi-Gin Lam (林志堅, born 1991), Hong Kong football player
