= 23rd Golden Melody Awards =

Taiwanese music awards ceremony in 2012

- Location: Taipei Arena, Taipei Taiwan
- Hosted by: Mickey Huang, Tien Hsin

Television/radio coverage
- Network: TTV

The 23rd Golden Melody Awards (Chinese: 第23屆金曲獎) were held on 13 June 2012 at Taipei Arena in Taipei, Taiwan. The awards ceremony gave musical awards to musicians and songs in languages such as Mandarin, Taiwanese, and Hakka.

== Winners ==
Below is a full list of winners and nominees
Note:Bold indicates winner of that category.

=== Song of the Year ===
- Perfect landing "put me into your (ten years behind the creation of the essence of film and television theme songs on the album)" ╱ barefoot is not hot enough
- **Noah's Ark "Second Life (no where-End Edition)" ╱ believe music**
- So grow up, "So grow up" ╱ Asian god of music
- Speaking of love "when it comes to love" ╱ Asian god of music
- In those years, "those years, we were chasing girls" ╱ Sony Music Taiwan

=== Best Mandarin Album ===
- **Second Life (no where-End Edition) ╱ believe music**
- Wonderful Life (paperback edition) ╱ RHINOTECH music
- MY LOVE ╱ RHINOTECH music
- Where God is not allowed to cry ╱ Asian music
- When it comes to love God ╱ Asian music
- People ╱ Kung Fu Entertainment

=== Best Taiwanese Album ===
- Island travel ╱ chaos sound production
- Musical culture forever ╱ artery
- Crescent moon ╱ universe Television
- Rolling Stone music seasons ╱
- **Warner Music will miss scared ╱**

=== Best Hakka Album ===
- Liang Liang ╱ who better to create different musical life
- Wo Long ╱ Mountain Dog Big Band
- **Lan took ╱ Rising Sun Culture**
- ButterfLife ╱ Wade Culture

=== Best Indigenous Album ===
- Beautiful day ╱ Harvest Publishing
- Ina childhood ╱ Amis ga Wataru Orchestra
- **My Carefree Life ╱ Wind Music**
- Listen to the sound ╱ Harley-woman musical
- BaLiwakes (Baal Vargas) - Nanwang sisters with the National Taiwan Symphony Orchestra ╱ angle head culture

=== Best Music Video ===
- Imperial "Takasago Army" ╱ red group play, Ltd. Chong (Director: Zhuang Zhiwen)
- **Lonely mad "So grow up" ╱ Yashen Music (Director: Bier Jia)**
- My Love "MY LOVE" ╱ RHINOTECH Music (Director: Bier Jia)
- Bird's Nest "What troubles you" ╱ Universal Music (Director: Zhuowei Chi)
- Old Love Song "Rangers Diary Episode home in Arctic Village" ╱ Rolling Stones Music (Director: Zhou Getai)

=== Best Composition ===
- **Mayday Masa╱ Noah's Ark "Second Life (no where-End Edition)" ╱ believe music**
- Jiaoan Pu ╱ you please give me some good rival "MY LOVE" ╱ RHINOTECH music
- Xie chords ╱ So grow up, "So grow up" ╱ Asian god of music
- Khalil ╱ lonely patient "? "╱ Universal Music
- Tanya ╱ Speaking of love "when it comes to love" ╱ Asian god of music

=== Best Lyrics ===
- Mayday Ashin ╱ Noah's Ark "Second Life (no where-End Edition)" ╱ believe music
- Li Gedi ╱ you please give me some good rival "MY LOVE" ╱ RHINOTECH music
- Osamu ╱ long shot, "so what" ╱ Asian god of music
- **Takeo ╱ Abba milkfish 'thoughts will be scared "╱ Warner Music**
- GE greatly ╱ comes love "when it comes to love" ╱ Asian god of music
- Jonathan Lee ╱ pregnant Pearl "primary" ╱ Universal Music

=== Best Music Arrangement ===
- **Mayday** **Masa** **╱ Noah's Ark "Second Life (no where-End Edition)" ╱ believe music**
- Fan Zhezhong ╱ you please give me some good rival "MY LOVE" ╱ RHINOTECH music
- Xu Qianxiu ╱ meteorite "is not allowed to cry occasions" ╱ Asian god of music
- Tanya, Doug Petty, Charlton Pettus, Brian Allen, Jamie Wollam ╱ Speaking of love "when it comes to love" ╱ Asian god of music
- Jay ╱ sailors afraid of the water, "exclamation point (Deluxe Edition)" ╱ JVR Music

=== Producer of the Year, Album ===
- **Mayday ╱ Second Life (no where-End Edition) ╱ believe music**
- Peggy Hsu ╱ ╱ bend fantasy boutiques music
- Chen Jian Qi ╱ ╱ Asian occasions are not allowed to cry God Music
- Tanya ╱ ╱ Asia God comes to love music
- Large Joanna Wang ╱ ╱ adventure Boniface Sony Music Taiwan

=== Producer of the Year, Single ===
- Lu Zhen Huang, Guo Wenzong ╱ want freedom "Wonderful Life (paperback edition)" ╱ RHINOTECH music
- Wang Zhiping ╱ you please give me some good rival "MY LOVE" ╱ RHINOTECH music
- He official ingots, Xie chords ╱ So grow up, "So grow up" ╱ Yashen music
- Edward Chan, Charles Lee, Khalil ╱ lonely patient "? "╱ Universal Music
- **Xue Zhongming ╱ those years "in those years, we were chasing girls" ╱ Sony Music Taiwan**

=== Best Mandarin Male Singer ===
- **Luan Xiang ╱ put me into your (ten years behind the creation of the essence of film and television theme songs on the album) ╱ barefoot is not hot**
- Yoga Lin ╱ Wonderful Life (paperback edition) ╱ RHINOTECH music
- Eason ╱? ╱ Universal Music
- Jay ╱ exclamation point (Deluxe Edition) ╱ JVR Music
- Hsiao Rhapsody ╱ ╱ Warner Music

=== Best Taiwanese Male Singer ===
- Michael Shih ╱ ╱ island travel chaos sound production
- **Barren bright ╱ ╱ artery musical culture forever**
- Chris Hung ╱ ╱ Walt beautiful love song music
- Yen Yung-neng ╱ ╱ Takao Run
- Hsiao Huang-chi thoughts will surprise ╱ ╱ Warner Music

=== Best Mandarin Female Singer ===
- A-Lin ╱ We Will Be Beter ╱ Avex we will be better
- Stefanie ╱ It's Time ╱ wonderful music
- Hebe Tien ╱ MY LOVE ╱ RHINOTECH music
- Waa Wei ╱ The occasion which is not allowed to cry ╱ Asian occasions are not allowed to cry God Music
- Mei ╱ Are You Looking At Me (You And Me Commemorate Edition) ╱ Gold Typhoon
- **Tanya Chua ╱ Speaking of Love ╱ Asia God comes to love music**

=== Best Taiwanese Female Singer ===
- Shirley Maya ╱ ╱ you can not live without music Walter
- **Xie Jin Yan crescent moon ╱ ╱ universe Television**
- Li Yasuo ╱ ╱ seasons Rolling Stones music
- Zhan Yawen ╱ ╱ Yawen Shan Bo Ying-tai music studio
- Jennifer Love Lee (Chia) ╱ ╱ beautiful woman who say infinite music

=== Best Hakka Singer ===
- Stuff (Tangyun Huan) ╱ happiness DNA ╱ Wo wide entertainment
- Shangguan Ganoderma ╱ ╱ who hit pretty good as life pretty different music studio
- **Luo Sirong took ╱ ╱ embrace cultural Rising Sun**

=== Best Aboriginal Singer ===
- Pull Wei Shi ╱ Lao beautiful day outside ╱ ╱ Harvest Publishing
- **Ilid Kaolo ╱ My Carefree Life ╱ Wind Music**
- Less Ni Yao ╱ Le minutes long points ╱ Harley listen to the sound of music - women
- By Bai Weiji ╱ interpretation of music released

=== Best Band ===
- **Mayday ╱ Second Life (no where-End Edition) ╱ believe music**
- Tizzy Bac telltale heart ╱ ╱ musical bent
- Pretenders pretenders ╱ ╱ Seed Music
- Mary See the Future ╱ Yes, I Am ╱ map International Multimedia
- Soda Green ╱ ╱ what you worry Universal Music

=== Best Group ===
- Kitahara Bobcats ╱ ╱ happy tribe sing new music
- Free play free play ╱ ╱ Universal Music Soundtrack
- **New Taiwan Taiwan Kang Kang band ╱ new band "eight" foot open open ╱ Rolling Stones music**
- Nanwang sisters ╱ BaLiwakes (Baal Vargas) - Nanwang sisters and National Taiwan Symphony Orchestra ╱ angle head culture

=== Best New Artist ===
- Wu Nanying ╱ Wu Nanying "I just Wu Nanying" ╱ nothing more than cultural
- Girl and Robot ╱ Miss November ╱ Yashen music
- A-fu ╱ That's How It Is ╱ Forward Music
- **Ilid Kaolo ╱ My Carefree Life ╱ Wind Music**
- Li Jia Wei ╱ Warner Music

=== Best Instrumental Album ===
- Tsunami TSUNAMI ╱ Samoa international supplier to the Japanese
- **Forgotten Time ╱ stone**
- Rolling Ashin soundtrack soundtrack ╱ monkeys led integrated marketing
- . Seediq Bale ╱ Forward Music
- Reflectors ╱ Li Xinyun music studio

=== Producer of the Year, Instrumental ===
- Chung, Baby ╱ ╱ stone Forgotten Time
- Wang Xiwen ╱ roll bar Oshin soundtrack soundtrack ╱ monkeys led integrated marketing
- Chung's, Ken Ohtake ╱ Ken Ohtake & Friends (Ken Ohtake and friends) I Must Have Been There (deja far) ╱ Trees Music
- **He Guojie ╱ ╱ Seediq Bale ‧ Forward Music**
- Li Xinyun ╱ ╱ Li Xinyun music studio reflectors

=== Best Instrumental Composition ===
- **Chung, Baby ╱ who stole the Time "Forgotten Time" ╱ stone**
- Wang Xiwen ╱ boy roll bar "roll bar Oshin soundtrack soundtrack" ╱ monkeys led integrated marketing
- He Guojie ╱ encounter Rainbow Bridge "Seediq ‧ Bale" ╱ Forward Music
- Hou Yongguang ╱ soul space "reflector" ╱ Li Xinyun music studio
- Hou Yongguang ╱ sad without injury traveler "reflector" ╱ Li Xinyun music studio

=== Best Album Packaging ===
- Xiaoqing Yang (Xiaoqing Yang studio) ╱ After 75 Years ╱ Seed Music
- Forest of B ╱ 4-6 pm ╱ Yashen music
- Jia Wei Lai flattered ╱ ╱ Decca Records
- Xiaoqing Yang (Xiaoqing Yang studio) ╱ BaLiwakes (Baal Vargas) Nanwang sisters with the *National Taiwan Symphony Orchestra ╱ angle head culture
- Wei seed ╱ Ken Ohtake & Friends (Ken Ohtake and friends) I Must Have Been There (deja far) ╱ Trees Music
- **Mori Chen Shou Chen (keep working iso) ╱ exclamation point (Limited USB Edition) ╱ JVR Music**
- Nie Yong really ╱ you look at me (Pre hide Edition) ╱ Gold Typhoon

==== Special Contributions Award ====
- **Wen Hsia**
