= James Tsai =

Taiwanese politician (born 1952)

Tsai Jen-chien
- 蔡仁堅
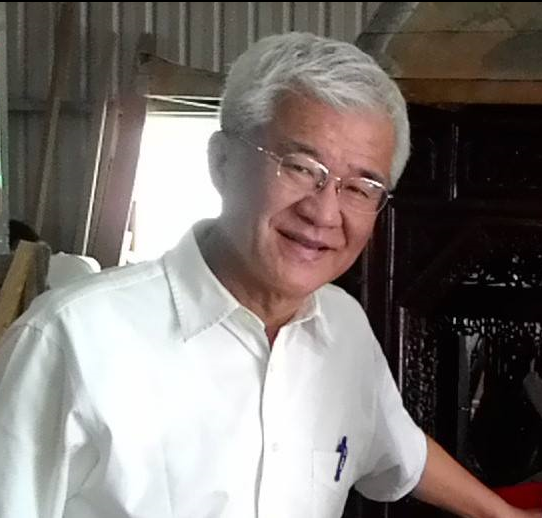

Mayor of Hsinchu
- In office 20 December 1997 – 20 December 2001
- Deputy: Yang Tzu-pao; Lin Cheng-chieh
- Preceded by: Tong Shen-nan
- Succeeded by: Lin Junq-tzer

Member of the National Assembly
- In office 1992–1997

Personal details
- Born: 27 October 1952 (age 73) Hsinchu, Taiwan
- Party: Independent
- Other political affiliations: Democratic Progressive Party (1986–2014)
- Education: Ming Chuan University (MB); Harvard University (MPA)

Tsai Jen-chien (Chinese: 蔡仁堅; born 27 October 1952), also known by his English name James Tsai, is a Taiwanese pharmacist and politician who served as mayor of Hsinchu from 1997 to 2001.

== Education ==
After graduating from Affiliated Senior High School of National Taiwan Normal University, Tsai graduated from Taipei Medical University with a Bachelor of Medicine (M.B.) in pharmacy. He then completed graduate studies in the United States at Harvard University, where he earned a Master of Public Administration (M.P.A.) degree from the Harvard Kennedy School.

== Political career ==
A cofounder of the Democratic Progressive Party, Tsai served on the National Assembly from 1992 to 1997, and was the DPP caucus leader throughout his term. The legislative body elected its first speaker and deputy speaker during its 1996 session. Tsai was nominated as the DPP candidate for the deputy speakership, and lost to Shieh Lung-sheng. Tsai was elected mayor of Hsinchu in the 1997 local elections. In October 2000, he became the first elected local government leader from Taiwan to visit China. The next year, Tsai lost his bid for reelection. He attempted to run for the position again in 2014, without the backing of the DPP, which expelled him for mounting an independent campaign.

2014 Hsinchu City Mayoralty Election Result
No.	Candidate	Party	Votes	Percentage
1	Liu Cheng-hsing (劉正幸)	Independent	1,914	0.96%
2	Hsu Ming-tsai	KMT	75,564	37.85%
3	James Tsai	Independent	40,480	20.28%
4	Lin Chih-chien	DPP	76,578	38.36%
5	Wu Shu-min (吳淑敏)	Independent	5101	2.56%

== Controversy ==
During his mayoral term, Tsai was one of many mayors accused of corruption, as he had charged United Microelectronics Corporation a "township chief tax" for community development funds.

Soon after leaving office, Tsai was caught in the Chu Mei-feng sex scandal, during which he was represented by attorney Hsu Wen-bin. Tsai and Chu had dated for four years, before the relationship ended in February 2001. Later that year, a sex tape of Chu and married businessman Tseng Chung-ming was released. Prosecutors believed that Tsai and spiritual advisor Kuo Yu-ling asked a detective agency about hidden cameras. Tsai was questioned by the Taipei District Prosecutors' Office in January 2002, and indicted on 7 February. However, Chu chose to drop the case against Tsai in June.
