= Haishan Fishing Port =

Fishing port in Xiangshan, Hsinchu City, Taiwan

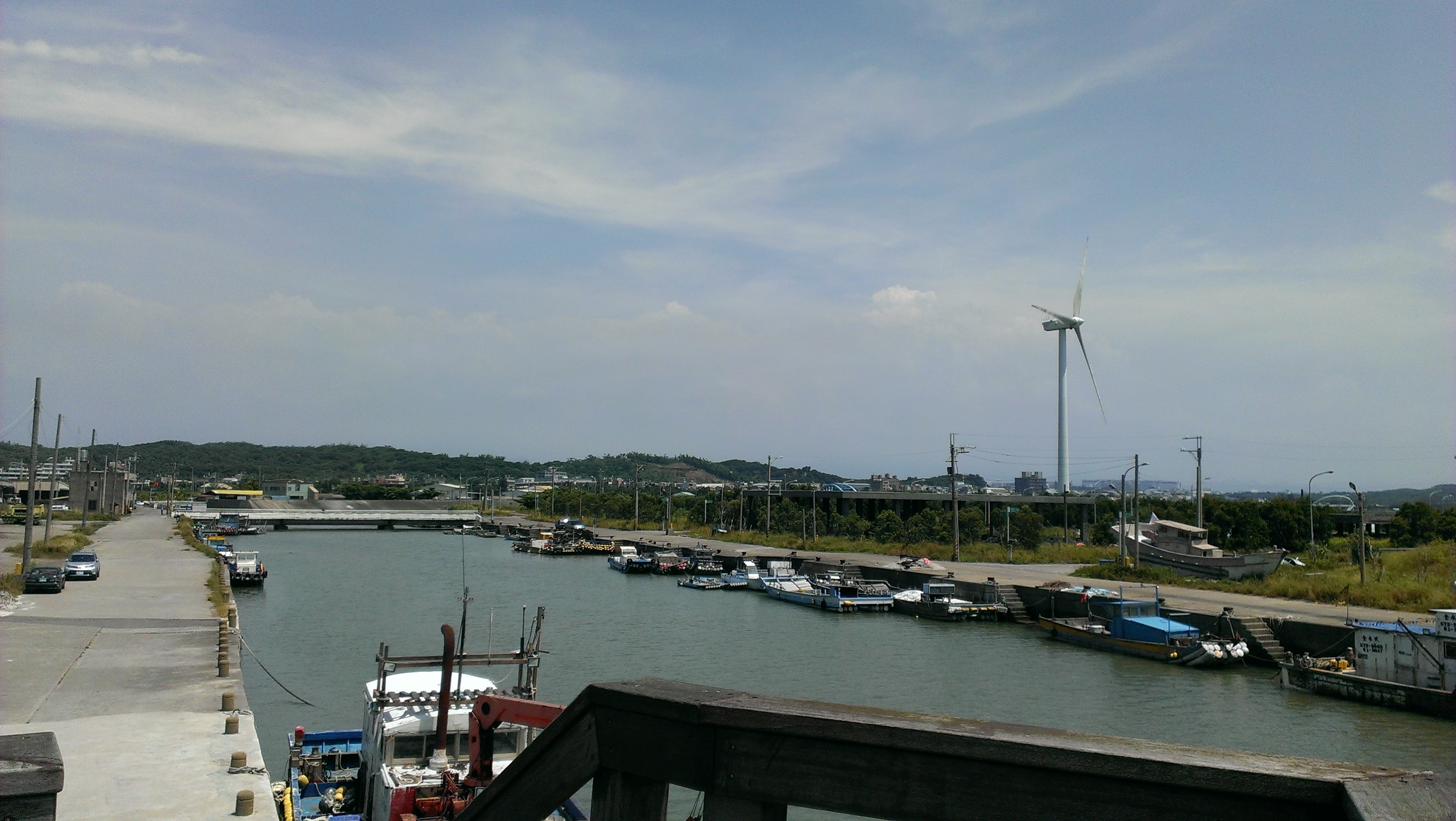
- Interactive map of Haishan Fishing Port
- Location within Taiwan
- Native name: 海山漁港

Location
- Location: Xiangshan, Hsinchu City, Taiwan
- Coordinates: 24°45′53.0″N 120°54′20.4″E

Details
- Type of Harbor: fishing port

The Haishan Fishing Port (traditional Chinese: 海山漁港; simplified Chinese: 海山渔港; pinyin: Hǎishān Yúgǎng) is a fish harbor in Xiangshan District, Hsinchu City, Taiwan.

== History ==
In 1988, the Hsinchu City Government built tide breaker to provide a place for fishing boats to park during monsoon periods.

== Economy ==
Fishermen at this harbor make a living from inshore fishing and shallow sea creatures. The harbor is also a center for fish and produce selling, such as dairy products, organic fruits and vegetables.

== Ecology ==
Most of the fish within the harbor area are blackfish, bream, cuttlefish and shark.

== Transportation ==
The harbor is accessible within walking distance west of Xiangshan Station of Taiwan Railway.

== See also ==
- Fisheries Agency
