= Xiangshan railway station =

Railway station located in Hsinchu, Taiwan

Xiangshan Station 香山車站
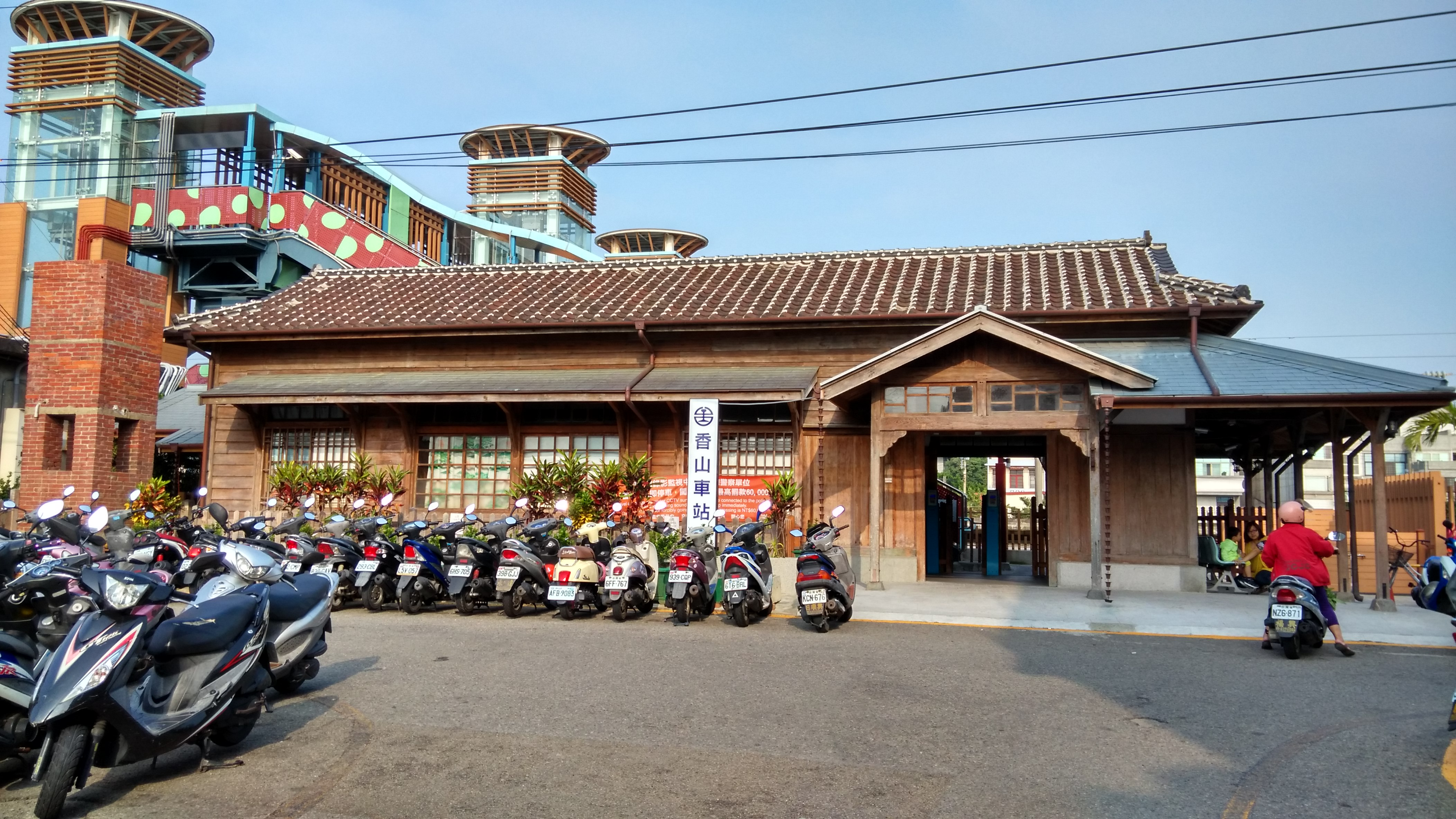
- Station entrance

Chinese name
- Traditional Chinese: 香山車站
Transcriptions
Standard Mandarin
- Hanyu Pinyin: Xiāngshān Chēzhàn
- Bopomofo: ㄒㄧㄤ ㄕㄢ ㄔㄜ ㄓㄢˋ

General information
- Location: Xiangshan, Hsinchu; Taiwan
- Coordinates: 24°45′47″N 120°54′50″E
- System: Taiwan Railway railway station
- Line: West Coast line
- Distance: 114.4 km to Keelung
- Platforms: 2 island platforms

Construction
- Structure type: At-grade

Other information
- Station code: 116

History
- Opened: 10 August 1902

Passengers
- 2017: 185,726 per year
- Rank: 129

Services
| Preceding station | Taiwan Railway | Following station |
|---|---|---|
| Sanxingqiao towards Keelung | Western Trunk line | Qiding towards Kaohsiung |
Location

Xiangshan railway station (Chinese: 香山車站; pinyin: Xiāngshān Chēzhàn) is a railway station located in Xiangshan District, Hsinchu City, Taiwan. It is located on the West Coast line and is operated by Taiwan Railway. The wooden station building is a city-designated historical monument.

== Around the station ==
- Haishan Fishing Port
