= Mom, Take Care of Yourself! =

Taiwanese song

- 媽媽請你也保重
- Hàn-jī: 媽媽請汝也保重
- Pe̍h-ōe-jī: Má-má chhiáⁿ Lí iā Pó-tiōng
- Literal meaning: Mom, Take Care of Yourself!
- Tâi-lô: Má-má tshiánn Lí iā Pó-tiōng
- Bbánpìng: Mǎmǎ cniǎ Lǐ yiâ Bǒdiông

"Mom, Take Care of Yourself!"

Song by Wen Hsia
- Released: May 18, 2003
- Length: 3:56
- Composer: Shinichi Nozaki
- Lyricist: Wen Hsia

"Mom, Take Care of Yourself!" (Mandarin Chinese: 媽媽請你也保重), or "Mama, Please Take Care" is a cover by Wen Hsia of the 1957 Japanese song "Though We Came to Tokyo" (Japanese: 俺らは東京へ來たけれど). The song was originally composed by Shinichi Nozaki (野崎真一) and sung by sung by Hideo Fujishima (藤島桓夫), with lyrics by Takashi Kojima (小島高志). Taiwanese lyrics were written by Wen Hsia in 1959, describing the sadness of a young man from a rural village who leaves his home to fight for his life in the city, and his mother's heart when he is in a foreign land.

During the White Terror and the period of martial law in Taiwan, this song, as well as "Wish You Come Back Soon" (望你早歸), "Mend the Broken Net" (補破網), Longing for the Spring Breeze (望春風), and “Hometown at Dusk” (黃昏的故鄉) were banned by the Government Information Office, because of their associations with the tangwai movement. The official government explanation was that in the military, missing one’s mother would damage morale.

== Censorship ==
Chen Cheng, President of the Taiwan Provincial Government and Commander-in-Chief of the National Police promulgated martial law in 1949 until 1987 when President Chiang Ching-kuo declared that martial law would be lifted and formally terminated. During the martial law period, the government restricted people's freedoms and basic human rights, including the rights to assembly, association, speech, and publication, as well as banned political parties and newspapers. "Mom, Take Care of Yourself!" was banned by the Police Headquarters on the grounds of "homesickness, disturbing military morale and undermining morale, soldier can't miss his mom".

Singer Wen Hsia was also known as the "King of Banned Songs", and during the 38 years of martial law in Taiwan, 99 songs were banned.

== Interpretation of lyrics ==
The lyrics describe the helplessness and vicissitudes of life of a traveler who works alone in the city, evoking the nostalgia for his mother and his hometown, and portraying the loneliness and anxiety of men and women in the rural areas of the province who have left their hometowns alone to work for a living.
