= Hsinchu Kuang-Fu Senior High School =

- 新竹市私立光復高級中學

Location
- No. 153, Section 2, Guangfu Road, East District; Hsinchu, 300; Taiwan; 24°47′54″N 120°59′37″E

Information
- Other name: KFSH
- School type: Private comprehensive high school
- Motto: 儉樸、奮鬥、創造 (Note: In local languages: Mandarin Pinyin: Jiǎnpǔ, fèndòu, chuàngzào) (Save, Struggle, Create)
- Founded: 1953
- School number: 181305
- Mascot: Mandrill
- Website: www.kfsh.hc.edu.tw

Hsinchu Kuang-Fu Senior High School, (Note: In local languages: Traditional Chinese script: 新竹市私立光復高級中學; Mandarin Pinyin: Xīnzhú Shì Sīlì Guāngfù Gāojí Zhōngxué) also shortened to Kuang-Fu High School, (Note: In local languages: Traditional Chinese script: 光復中學; Mandarin Pinyin: Guāngfù Zhōngxué) is a private comprehensive high school in Hsinchu, Taiwan. Founded in 1953, it is located in the city's East District, adjacent to National Tsing Hua University. It has a senior high school, a junior high school, a further education school, a vocational school, and a kindergarten.

Kuang-Fu High School garnered international attention in late 2016, when students held a Nazi-themed parade to celebrate the school's anniversary. The incident was condemned by the Taiwanese government, as well as the Israeli and German missions to Taiwan.

== History ==
=== Founding and expansion ===
The site of Kuang-Fu High School was originally a school for children of workers at an Imperial Japanese Navy fuel plant in Hsinchu. The plant and the school were closed after World War II.

Hsinchu County Kuang-Fu Tutorial High School was opened in 1953. Two years later, the school became Hsinchu County Kuang-Fu Senior High School. When Hsinchu was upgraded from a county to a city in 1982, the school changed its name accordingly. The school expanded in 1967, 1994, and 1999, with the additions of a cram school, a junior high school, and a kindergarten, respectively. A comprehensive education program was also piloted in 1999; Kuang-Fu transformed into a comprehensive high school in 2003 following the program's success.

=== 2011 assault case ===
In early 2011, a video circulated online of three Kuang-Fu High School students assaulting a junior high school student from another school who was kneeling down and uncombative. The assault occurred at approximately 4:50 pm on 17 March 2011; the perpetrators kicked, shoved, slapped and insulted the victim. The perpetrators were given detention and temporarily suspended by the school administration, but the victim's parents declined to pursue criminal charges after reaching a settlement for NT$3,600 (US$167 in 2024) with the perpetrators' parents on 23 March. Local police nonetheless launched an investigation and interviewed seven suspects, but ultimately no charges were laid.

A video of the assault was published online on 25 March 2011 and quickly went viral, allegedly prompting one of the perpetrators to threaten netizens with lawsuits and forge a settlement letter from the victim. The settlement letter, supposedly signed by the victim, offered the families of the perpetrators NT$100,000 (US$4,650 in 2024) in damages; it was quickly rejected by the local courts. Two of the perpetrators publicly apologized to the school's principal on 28 March.

Two students unrelated to the original incident were arrested on 30 March 2011 for falsely claiming in online forums that they were gang members acquainted with the perpetrators, and that the assault was in response to the victim's refusal to prostitute herself for a gang. One of the students, a high school senior, was charged with inciting others to commit crimes, and the other, a college freshman, was charged with intimidation.

=== 2016 Nazi-themed parade ===
In late 2016, Kuang-Fu High School made international headlines after its students held a Nazi-themed parade to celebrate the 63rd anniversary of the school's founding. A history teacher at the school, Liu Hsi-cheng, proposed to his homeroom students that they parade as historical figures for an anniversary event on 23 December 2016. Liu suggested famous figures from Arab history, but his students voted to "cosplay" as Nazis instead. Liu warned the students that their chosen theme would be "very controversial", but he ultimately decided to respect the students' decision. In preparation for the parade, Liu's students altered their black school uniforms to resemble those of the Schutzstaffel (SS), the paramilitary of the Nazi Party. They also constructed a life-sized tank out of cardboard. At the event, students marched around school grounds while carrying Nazi flags and standards; a few students were also photographed giving the Nazi salute.

The parade, which took place the day before the start of Hanukkah that year, was widely condemned both domestically and internationally. Israel's de facto embassy in Taiwan, the Israel Economic and Cultural Office in Taipei, issued the following statement:

It is deplorable and shocking that only seven decades after the world had witnessed the horrors of the Holocaust, a high school in Taiwan is supporting such an outrageous action as we witnessed yesterday at Hsinchu Kuang-Fu Senior High School. We strongly condemn this tasteless occurrence and call on the Taiwanese authorities, in all levels, to initiate educational programs which would introduce the meaning of the Holocaust and teach its history and universal meaning.

The office offered the school educational resources and were invited to speak to the students about the Holocaust. Germany's de facto embassy in Taiwan, German Institute Taipei, stated: "Sadly, the students clearly do not understand that the Nazi symbol stands for disregard for human rights and oppression." The Taiwan Presidential Office expressed its regret and disappointment, stating:

We feel it is extremely disrespectful to the Jewish people who had been victims of the oppression perpetrated during wars, but more importantly, it highlighted ignorance about history. The responsibility of an education facility is to teach students that peace and diversity did not come easily. The freedom of thinking should be based on justice and respect, rather than misconduct. Education authorities should require the school to shoulder responsibility by seriously reflecting on the incident, understand and improve education in related fields of study and apologize to the countries it offended.

Taiwan's Ministry of Education expressed its "astonishment and regret", and the then education minister, Pan Wen-chung, publicly apologized and urged other Taiwanese schools to educate their students about the Holocaust.

Kuang-Fu High School's principal at the time, Cheng Hsiao-ming, immediately resigned following reports of the parade. In his resignation letter dated 25 December 2016, he accepted responsibility for the incident and apologized to the public, as well as victims of the Holocaust. He also announced that Liu would be held accountable for the incident along with the school's administrators, but the students would not be punished.

== Basketball team ==
The Kuang-Fu High School basketball team was founded in 2015 and is a member of Taiwan's prestigious High School Basketball League (HBL). The team has been crowned HBL champions twice, in 2022 and 2023. Its logo depicts a mandrill.

== Notable alumni ==
- A-FÜ (Teng Fu-ju), Taiwanese singer
- Chen Chiao-en, Taiwanese actress, singer, and television host
