= Wen Hsia =

Taiwanese singer and actor (1928–2022)

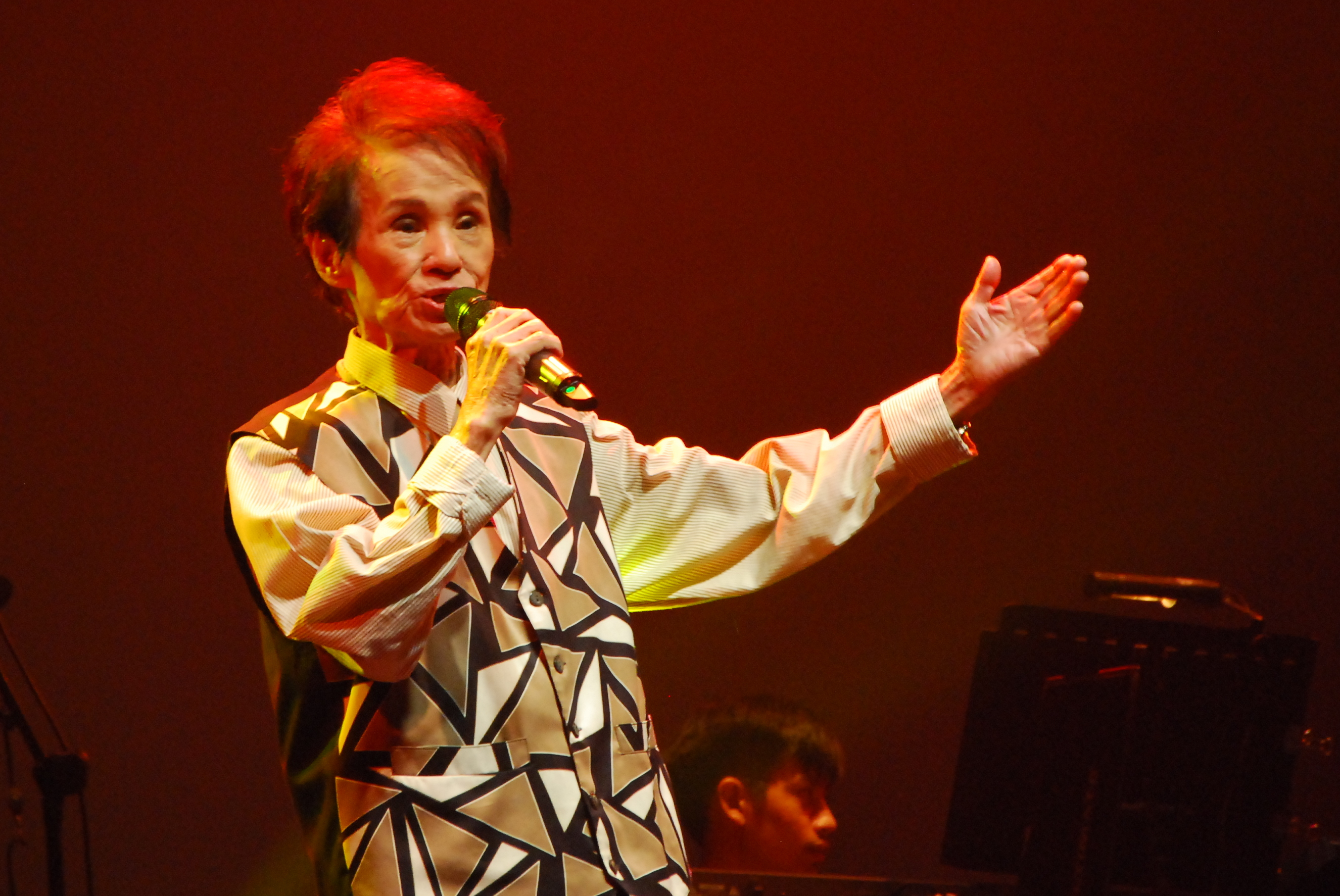
- Wen Hsia in 2006
- Born: 20 May 1928; Matō, Sobun, Tainan, Taiwan, Empire of Japan
- Died: 6 April 2022 (aged 93)

Wen Hsia (Chinese: 文夏; 20 May 1928 – 6 April 2022) was a Taiwanese singer and actor.

== Personal life ==
Wen Hsia was born Wang Jui-ho in 1928, in present-day Madou District, Tainan, and studied music in Japan, then returned to Taiwan to attend high school. He was married to Wen Hsiang, who was also a singer, and one of the four women in Wen Hsia and His Sisters. Wen Hsia died in his sleep on 6 April 2022, aged 93.

== Career ==
At the age of five, prior to pursuing musical training, Wang performed Christian hymns alongside his parents in their church choir. As a student at National Tainan Commercial Vocational Senior High School, Wang formed the Hawaiian Band, which played internationally famous songs and Hawaiian music. In time, the Hawaiian Band held weekly performances broadcast by the Broadcasting Corporation of China. Considering the Hawaiian Band's increasing popularity, Wang adopted a stage name so that listeners would not suspect he was a student. As a child, Wang was known as Little Wenhua, after his parents' Wen Hua Textiles company, and in kanji, wen hua (文化) and wen hsia (文夏) share the same pronunciation. Wang became known as Wen Hsia, acknowledging his childhood nickname, and his own Hawaiian Band, as 'Hawaii' in Mandarin also begins with hsia.

Wen Hsia wrote his first song, "Girl on the Waves" (漂浪之女), in his second year of high school, and asked writer, musician, local politician and neighbor Hsu Ping-ting to write the lyrics, which he later said "weren't song lyrics; they were poetry. They were absolutely beautiful." After the song was written, Wen Hsia invited four women as backup singers, and toured throughout Taiwan as Wen Hsia and His Sisters.

From the 1950s to the 1960s, Wen Hsia was known for his covers of Japanese melodies featuring Taiwanese Hokkien lyrics, a practice that began in the 1930s. These works were known as mixed-blood songs. "Mom, Take Care of Yourself!" is a mixed-blood cover with lyrics written by Wen Hsia, as is "Hometown at Dusk". When it was first released, "Hometown at Dusk" was credited to "Melancholy Man", as were approximately 300 other mixed-blood songs. Wen Hsia did not reveal the identity behind this second stage name until later in his life. Both Wen Hsia and Chi Lu-hsia have performed "Green Island Serenade". Together with Ang It-hong, the three are known for their work in the 1950s as "two kings and queen” of Taiwanese pop music.

Wen Hsia also sang in Japanese. Over the course of his career, Wen Hsia wrote more than 2,000 songs. During martial law in Taiwan, Hokkien pop was heavily censored and Wen Hsia became known as the "king of banned songs." Wen Hsia recorded over 1,200 songs, of which 99 were banned by Kuomintang authorities. His 1961 work, "Mama, I’m Brave" (媽媽我也很勇健) was banned for thirty years, setting a record for the longest period a Hokkien pop song was prohibited. Wen Hsia's songs became regarded as classics. At the 23rd Golden Melody Awards in 2012, Wen Hsia received the Golden Melody Lifetime Contribution Award.

As an actor, Wen Hsia starred in Joseph Kuo's remakes of the Japanese Wataridori film series, in which the protagonist was originally portrayed by Akira Kobayashi. He appeared in eleven Taiwanese Hokkien films from 1962 to 1972.
