= Hsu Ming-tsai =

Taiwanese politician

- 許明財
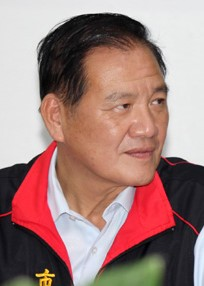

Mayor of Hsinchu City
- In office 20 December 2009 – 25 December 2014
- Deputy: You Jian-hua
- Preceded by: Lin Junq-tzer
- Succeeded by: Lin Chih-chien

Personal details
- Born: 13 June 1953 (age 73) Hsinchu City, Taiwan
- Party: Kuomintang
- Education: Chinese Culture University (BA); Dominican University (MPA); Chung Hua University (PhD)

Hsu Ming-tsai (traditional Chinese: 許明財; simplified Chinese: 许明财; pinyin: Xǔ Míngcái; born 13 June 1953) is a Taiwanese politician. He served as the mayor of Hsinchu City from 20 December 2009 until 25 December 2014.

== Education ==
Hsu graduated with his bachelor's degree in tourism management from Chinese Culture University. He then earned a master's degree in public administration from Dominican University in Illinois, United States, and his Ph.D. in technology management from Chung Hua University.

== Hsinchu City Mayoralty ==
=== Hsinchu City Mayoralty election ===
Hsu assumed the position of Mayor of Hsinchu City starting 20 December 2009 after winning the 2009 Republic of China local election on 5 December 2009 under the Kuomintang.

=== HKETCO Director visit to Hsinchu City ===
On 25 June 2013, Hsu received John Leung, the Director of the Hong Kong Economic, Trade and Cultural Office (HKETCO) in Taiwan with his colleagues. They had a meeting which were also attended by the Hsinchu Chamber of Commerce and Importers and Exporters Association of Hsinchu City.

=== 2014 Hsinchu City mayoralty election ===
In 2014, Hsu joined the 2014 Republic of China local election as a Kuomintang candidate for Mayor of Hsinchu City, going against his rival Lin Chih-chien from Democratic Progressive Party and independent candidate Tsai Jen-chien. His campaign slogan was Intelligence, happiness, health and security. His campaign promises were connecting Hsinchu city to Provincial Highway 61 and Jiadong Township in Pingtung County, calling for the relocation of CPC Corporation oil reserve building for its land to be used as the new city government center and city council building, relocating the urban center and turn the old town area into a historical and cultural tourist area, building an off-ramp from the Wuyang Expressway to Hsinchu City center, establishing a hospital for women and children and expanding the Hsinchu City branch of the National Taiwan University Hospital. Hsu however lost to DPP candidate Lin Chih-chien.

2014 Hsinchu City Mayoralty Election Result
No.	Candidate	Party	Votes	Percentage
1	Liu Cheng-hsing (劉正幸)	Independent	1,914	0.96%
2	Hsu Ming-tsai	KMT	75,564	37.85%
3	James Tsai	Independent	40,480	20.28%
4	Lin Chih-chien	DPP	76,578	38.36%
5	Wu Shu-min (吳淑敏)	Independent	5101	2.56%

=== 2018 Hsinchu City mayoralty election ===
2018 Kuomintang Hsinchu City mayoral primary results
Candidates	Place	UDN	Apollo Survey & Research	TVBS	Aggregated Result
Hsu Ming-tsai	Nominated	40.55%	42.89%	42.63%	42.02%
Lin Geng-ren	2nd	36.15%	34.63%	34.62%	35.13%
Li Guo-zhang	3rd	23.30%	22.48%	22.75%	22.84%

2018 Hsinchu City mayoral results
No.	Candidate	Party	Votes	Percentage
1	Hsieh Wen-chin (謝文進)	Independent	44,101	20.31%
2	Li Chi-qun (李驥羣)	Independent	705	0.32%
3	Huang Yuan-fu (黃源甫)	Independent	3,603	1.66%
4	Hsu Ming-tsai	Kuomintang	60,508	27.87%
5	Kuo Jung-jui (郭榮睿)	Independent	574	0.26%
6	Lin Chih-chien	Democratic Progressive Party	107,612	49.57%
Total voters			338,323	
Valid votes			217,103	
Invalid votes				
Voter turnout			64.17%	
