= Yuanpei University of Medical Technology =

University in Xiangshan, Hsinchu City, Taiwan

- 元培醫事科技大學
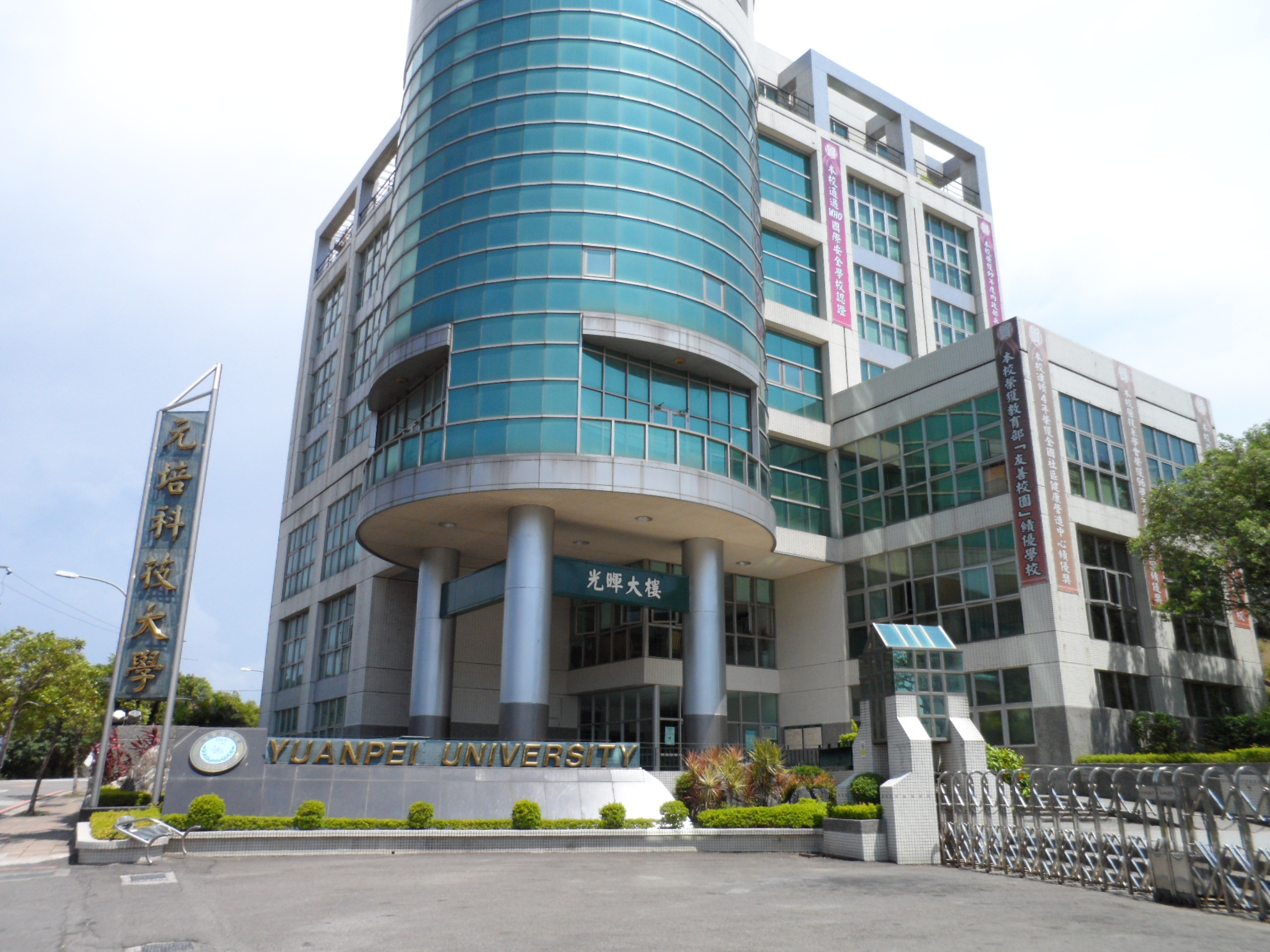
- Former names: Yuanpei Institute of Medical Technology; Yuanpei University of Science and Technology; Yuanpei University
- Type: Private
- Established: 8 November 1964
- Founders: Tsai Ping-kung
- President: Lin Chih-cheng
- Location: Xiangshan, Hsinchu City, Taiwan; 24.7824°N 120.9405°E
- Website: Official website
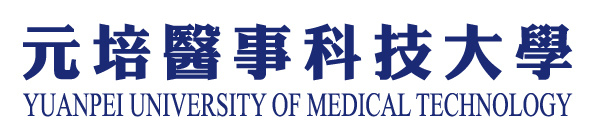

Yuanpei University of Medical Technology
- Traditional Chinese: 元培科技大學
Transcriptions
Standard Mandarin
- Hanyu Pinyin: Yuánpéi Kējì Dàxué
Southern Min
- Hokkien POJ: Goân-pôe Kho-ki Tāi-ha̍k

Yuanpei University of Medical Technology (YUMT; Chinese: 元培醫事科技大學; Pe̍h-ōe-jī: Goân-pôe I-sū Kho-ki Tāi-ha̍k) is a private university in Xiangshan District, Hsinchu City, Taiwan, named after Cai Yuanpei, a renowned educator and philosopher from China.

Yuanpei University of Medical Technology offers undergraduate and graduate programs in various fields of study, including medical technology, nursing, physical therapy, occupational therapy, nutrition, and biomedical informatics.

== History ==
The university was originally established on 8 November 1964 as Yuanpei Institute of Medical Technology after it was founded by Tsai Ping-kung. In 1999, it became Yuanpei University of Science and Technology. It was renamed to Yuanpei University in 2006 and again to Yuanpei University of Medical Technology in 2014.

== Faculties ==
- College of Medical Technology and Nursing
- College of Health Sciences
- College of Wellbeing and Industry

== See also ==
- List of universities in Taiwan
