= Sean Huang (musician) =

Taiwanese musician

Sean Huang 黃昺翔
- Born: December 12, 1989 (age 36); Tainan, Taiwan
- Genres: Mandopop, Taiwanese Hokkien pop
- Occupations: Singer-songwriter, music producer
- Formerly of: Chang and Lee

Sean Huang (Chinese: 黃昺翔; pinyin: Huáng Bǐngxiáng; born 12 December 1989) is a Taiwanese musician. He was previously a member of the band Chang and Lee.

== Life and career ==
Huang was born on 12 December 1989 in Tainan, Taiwan. He graduated from Tainan National University of the Arts with a bachelor's degree in applied music.

He released his first album 《黑》 in 2012. In 2019, he released the album What Are You Doing (《你在幹嘛》).

== Awards ==
During his time with the band Chang and Lee, Huang received several awards, including the Golden Melody Award for Best Vocal Group.

In 2020, Huang won the first prize in the Taiwanese Hokkien category of the Taiwan Music Composition and Songwriting Contest with his song "Call Me Daddy" (《叫爸爸》).

== Personal life ==
In November 2023, Huang was married to Singaporean artist Ruth Kueo.
