= Lin Chih-chien =

Politician from Taiwan (born 1975)

- 林智堅
- Official portrait, 2014

7th Mayor of Hsinchu
- In office 25 December 2014 – 8 July 2022
- Deputy: Shen Hui-hong
- Preceded by: Hsu Ming-tsai
- Succeeded by: Chen Chang-hsien (acting); Ann Kao

Hsinchu City Councillor
- In office 1 March 2010 – 25 December 2014
- Constituency: Hsinchi I

Personal details
- Born: 27 May 1975 (age 50) Xiangshan, Hsinchu County, Taiwan
- Party: Democratic Progressive Party
- Education: Chung Hua University (BA) (master's degree rescinded due to plagiarism); National Taiwan University (rescinded due to plagiarism)

Lin Chih-chien (Chinese: 林智堅; pinyin: Lín Zhìjiān; Wade–Giles: Lin^{2} Chih^{4}-chien^{1}; born 27 May 1975) is a Taiwanese politician. He was the mayor of Hsinchu City from 25 December 2014 to 8 July 2022.

== Early life and education ==
Lin earned his bachelor's degree in business administration followed by a master's degree in technology management from Chung Hua University's College of Management in 2008. In 2017, Lin obtained a second master's degree from National Taiwan University's Graduate Institute of National Development, where his thesis discussed the 2014 Hsinchu mayoral elections. Both master's degrees were rescinded by the respective institutions after investigations confirmed that Lin had plagiarized his theses for the two degrees.

== Political career ==
In 2014, Lin represented Democratic Progressive Party (DPP) as a candidate for the Hsinchu City mayoralty election. He was elected as the Mayor of Hsinchu City after narrowly defeating Kuomintang's (KMT) candidate Hsu Ming-tsai with a 1,014 vote majority on 29 November .

Lin was re-elected in 2018.

In December 2021, Lin proposed consolidating Hsinchu City and County to form a special municipality. As he was term limited (maximum of two terms for the same position) for the Hsinchu City mayoralty, he stated that he would not contest the mayoralty for this proposed entity during the 2022 local elections.

In June 2022, Lin accepted the DPP nomination for the Taoyuan mayoralty. On 12 August, Lin withdrew his nomination for the Taoyuan mayoralty after his master thesis was revoked by National Taiwan University.

== Electoral results ==
2014 Hsinchu City Mayoralty Election Result
No.	Candidate	Party	Votes	Percentage	Result
1	Liu Cheng-hsing (劉正幸)	Independent	1,914	0.96%	
2	Hsu Ming-tsai	Kuomintang	75,564	37.85%	
3	James Tsai	Independent	40,480	20.28%	
4	Lin Chih-chien	Democratic Progressive Party	76,578	38.36%	
5	Wu Shu-min (吳淑敏)	Independent	5101	2.56%	

2018 Hsinchu City Mayoralty Election Result
No.	Candidate	Party	Votes	Percentage	Result
1	Hsieh Wen-chin (謝文進)	Independent	44,101	20.31%	
2	Li Chi-qun (李驥羣)	Independent	705	0.32%	
3	Huang Yuan-fu (黃源甫)	Independent	3,603	1.66%	
4	Hsu Ming-tsai	Kuomintang	60,508	27.87%	
5	Kuo Jung-jui (郭榮睿)	Independent	574	0.26%	
6	Lin Chih-chien	Democratic Progressive Party	107,612	49.57%	
Total voters			338,323		
Valid votes			217,103		
Invalid votes					
Voter turnout			64.17%		

== Incident ==
The following month, Taipei City Councilor Wang Hung-wei claimed that Lin had plagiarized a research paper cowritten by Lee Yu-cheng and Wang Ming-lang while completing his master's degree at Chung Hua University's College of Management. Lin's adviser Ho Li-hsing and researcher Wang Ming-lang both signed written statements that asserted Lin had been on Wang Ming-lang's research team. Lin's second master's degree, obtained at National Taiwan University's Graduate Institute of National Development, was called into question by political commentator Huang Yang-ming. Huang suggested that Lin had plagiarized from Yu Cheng-huang, while Lin and Chen Ming-tong, Lin's adviser at NTU, stated that Yu had utilized research material collected by Lin.

National Taiwan University began an investigation into the allegations. The committee found that Lin plagiarized from Yu, and advised that Lin's master's degree be revoked National Taiwan University revoked his master's degree on 9 August. After the conclusion of investigations, Chung Hua University also revoked his master's degree on 24 August 2022.

Political offices
Preceded by Hsu Ming-tsai	Mayor of Hsinchu; 2014–2022	Succeeded by Chen Chang-hsien
