= Ilid Kaolo =

Taiwanese singer-songwriter of Amis descent

Ilid Kaolo (Chinese: 以莉·高露; pinyin: Yǐlì Gāolù, formerly Chinese: 劉靖怡; pinyin: Liú Jìngyí) is an indigenous Taiwanese singer-songwriter of Amis descent. She won the Best New Artist, Best Aboriginal Singer, and Best Indigenous Album at the 23rd Golden Melody Awards in Taiwan with her debut album, My Carefree Life (輕快的生活), in which Kaolo wrote every song on the album. She is also an organic rice farmer in eastern Taiwan with her record producer husband. She states that farming has inspired her musically.

She was born in Hualien County and moved to Taipei at the age of seven. She joined the Formosa Aboriginal Song and Dance Troupe in her twenties. Kaolo relocated to Taitung in 2006 to join in an agricultural collective run by the Hohak Band, and returned to Hualien in 2010. After signing with the Taiwanese indigenous music label Wild Fire Music, she adopted the stage name Hsiao-mei.

== See also ==
- Amis people
- Music of Taiwan
