= Chung Hua University =

University in Hsinchu, Taiwan

- 中華大學
- Motto: 勤樸誠正 (Pe̍h-ōe-jī: Khîn-phok Sêng-chèng)
- Motto in English: Diligence, Simplicity, Truthfulness, Justness
- Type: Private
- Established: 1990
- President: Cheng Tsarng-sheng
- Academic staff: 293
- Administrative staff: 166
- Students: 10,158
- Undergraduates: 8,578
- Postgraduates: 1,580
- Location: Xiangshan, Hsinchu City, Taiwan; 24°45′30″N 120°57′10″E
- Campus: Suburban
- Website: www1.chu.edu.tw

Chung Hua University
- Traditional Chinese: 中華大學
Transcriptions
Standard Mandarin
- Hanyu Pinyin: Zhōnghuá Dàxúe
- Wade–Giles: Chung¹-hua² Ta⁴-hsüeh²
- Tongyong Pinyin: Jhonghuá Dàsyúe
Southern Min
- Hokkien POJ: Tiong-hôa Tāi-ha̍k

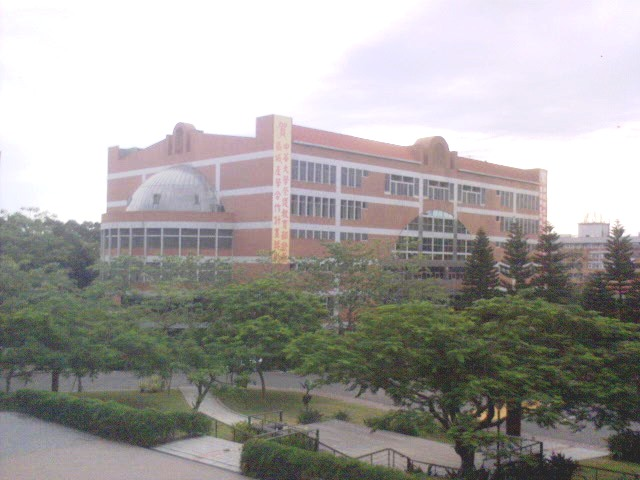

Chung Hua University (CHU; Chinese: 中華大學; Pe̍h-ōe-jī: Tiong-hôa Tāi-ha̍k) is a private university in Xiangshan District, Hsinchu, Taiwan. Founded in 1990 as the Chung Hua Polytechnic Institute, it became a university in 1997.

== History ==
The university was founded as "Chung Hua Polytechnic Institute" in 1990 by three local Hsinchu entrepreneurs, Ron-Chang Wang, Zau-Juang Tsai and Lin Junq-tzer. It was upgraded to university status and renamed as "Chung Hua University" in 1997. There are six colleges with 25 departments offering undergraduate courses as well as 16 master programs and 3 Ph.D. programs. CHU is accredited by AACSB.

== Organization ==
- College of Engineering
  - Department of Electronics Engineering
  - Department of Civil Engineering and Engineering Informatics
  - Department of Mechanical Engineering
  - Department of Applied Mathematics
  - Department of Communications Engineering
  - Department of Microelectronics Engineering
  - Degree Program of Photonics and Materials Science
  - Institute of Engineering and Science
  - Institute of Environmental Resource and Energy in Science and Technology
  - Institute of Mechanical and Aerospace Engineering
- College of Management
  - Department of Industrial Engineering and System Management
  - Department and Institute of Technology Management
  - Department and Institute of Business Administration
  - Department of Financial Management
  - Department of Transportation Technology and Logistics Management
  - Department of International Business
- College of Architecture and Planning
  - Department of Architecture and Urban Planning
  - Department of Landscape Architecture
  - Department of Construction Engineering & Project Management
  - Institute of Construction Management
- College of Humanities and Social Science
  - Department of Foreign Languages and Literature
  - Department and Institute of Public Administration
  - Centre of General Education
  - Centre of Teacher Education
- College of Computer Science and Information
  - Department of Computer Science and Information Engineering
  - Department of Information Management
  - Department of Bioinfomatics
  - Degree Program of Computer Science & Information
- College of Tourism
  - Department of Hotel & Restaurant Management
  - Department of Leisure and Recreational Management
  - Degree Program of Tourism and MICE Management

== Notable alumni ==
- Hsu Ming-tsai, Mayor of Hsinchu City (2009–2014)
- Hsu Yao-chang, Magistrate of Miaoli County
- Lin Chih-chien, Mayor of Hsinchu City
- Lu Chia-chen, member of Legislative Yuan (2008-2016)
- Chang Ching-chung, legislator
- Yen Kuan-heng, legislator

== See also ==
- List of universities in Taiwan
