= Fei Hsi-ping =

Fei Hsi-ping MLY
- 費希平
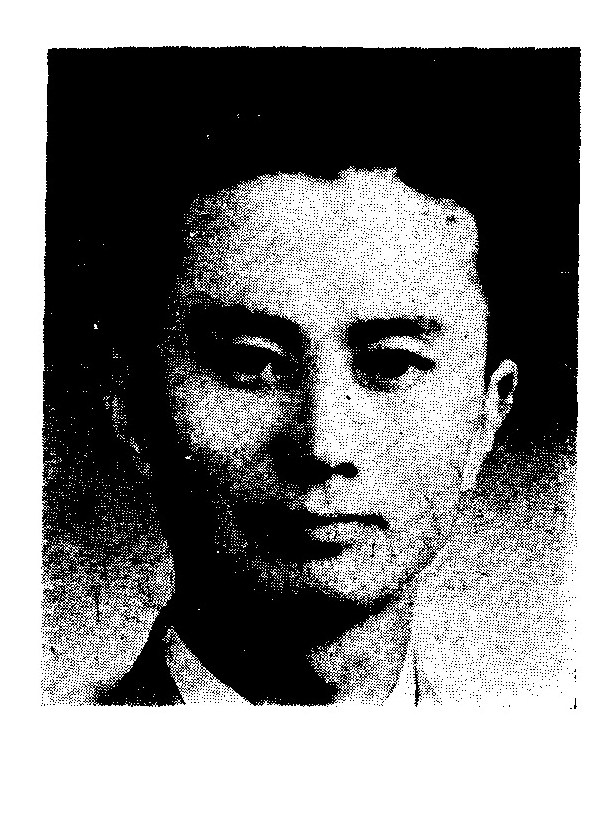

Member of the Legislative Yuan
- In office 18 May 1948 – 1990
- Constituency: Liaoning

Personal details
- Born: 1916 Liaoning, Republic of China
- Died: 21 February 2003 (aged 86) Los Angeles, California, United States
- Party: Independent (1960–1986; after 1988)
- Other political affiliations: Kuomintang (until 1960); Democratic Progressive Party (1986–1988)
- Education: Peking University
- Occupation: politician

Fei Hsi-ping (Chinese: 費希平; 1916–2003) was a Chinese-born politician who served in the Legislative Yuan from 1948 to 1990.

== Political career ==
Born in Liaoning in 1916, Fei attended Peking University. He was elected to the Legislative Yuan as a representative of his home province in 1948. Fei became a close friend and defender of democracy activist Lei Chen during Taiwan's years as an authoritarian, single-party state. Fei's association with Lei cost the former his Kuomintang membership, which was revoked in 1960. Fei began actively campaigning for the opposition after the Kaohsiung Incident in 1979, and, over time began drifting nearer to the tangwai movement. In 1981, Fei proposed the State Security Bill written to lift martial law in Taiwan. Despite supporting Taiwan's right to self determination in 1982, two years later Fei proposed that Taipei and Beijing form one political entity called the "Federation of Great China" in an effort to give the Republic of China a voice in the United Nations. He played a large role in the founding of the Democratic Progressive Party, and although he lost its first chairmanship election to Chiang Peng-chien, Fei was elected to the party's inaugural Central Standing Committee. Fei's State Security Bill was reconsidered in 1987, and when it was replaced by another proposal, the National Security Law, instead, some DPP members protested, with Fei himself leading objections to the protest. Martial law was lifted by order of Chiang Ching-kuo on 15 July 1987.

Throughout his political career, Fei remained opposed to Taiwan independence. Fei was often the mediator between the DPP and KMT, and continually issued calls for the parties to work together. The DPP continued to push for independence and legislative reform, and over these disagreements, Fei left the party in 1988, resigning his legislative seat in 1990. He later moved to the United States, and died of heart failure in Los Angeles on 21 February 2003, at the age of 86.
