= Chang and Lee =

Taiwanese band

- Origin: Taiwan
- Genres: Rock, Folk
- Years active: 2010–present
- Label: Indie
- Members: Zion (錫安); Yang Yizhen (楊一璿); Guo Dashu (郭達書); Ko Keke (柯顆顆)
- Past members: Sean Huang (阿翔); Bailu (百罡); Pony (小馬)

Chinese name
- Traditional Chinese: 張三李四
Transcriptions
Standard Mandarin
- Hanyu Pinyin: Zhāng Sān Lǐ Sì

Chang and Lee (Chinese: 張三李四) is a Taiwanese band formed in 2010. Their style is generally rock and folk, but they combine elements from other genres such as hip hop, country, electronics, and jazz.

Chang and Lee draw the inspiration for their work from the stories between urban and rural environments, from the local culture, relationships, and social issues.

== History ==
Their eponymous album Chang and Lee was released in December 2015.

They collaborated with Taipei mayor Ko Wen-je for the theme song for the two towers biking challenge.

On July 31, 2016, Axian, Bailu, and Pony left the band. Zion recruited Yang Yizhen, Guo Dashu, and Ko Keke to continue the band.

In 2017 they toured in 12 Asian cities in the countries of Japan, Thailand, Malaysia, the Philippines.

In 2017 they also performed at Pianos Livehouse in New York City, 288 Livehouse in Shanghai, and Music Matters Festival in Singapore.

They produced their second eponymous album in Nashville, and then released it in December 2017.

On April 8, 2018, they held their concert "Charge La" at Legacy Taipei.

== Awards ==
They won the first prize for the Taiwanese Language in the Taiwan Music Composition and Songwriting Contest in 2014

In 2016, the band's eponymous album was nominated for five awards (Best Vocal Group, Best Newcomer, Best Taiwanese Album, Best Lyrics, and Best Album Design) at the 27th Golden Melody Awards. They won Best Vocal Group. They won the best group award at the 17th Chinese Music Media Awards. During the award speech, the members of the band said that "the songs created by music are all providing a voice for the unsung heroes and minorities in this society."

In March 2017, their music video for the song Dismantle (拆), a collaboration by directors Zhang Xian, Peng Junyi, and Zhu Qiguang, was nominated at the NYC Independent Film Festival, Bare Bones International Film Festival, and the 28th Golden Melody Awards, where they won the Best Music Video Award.

On May 7, 2018, they were nominated for Top Ten Albums at the 11th Singapore Freshmusic Awards.

In 2018, they were nominated at the 29th Golden Melody Awards for Best Vocal Group, and Best Album Design.

== Name ==
The name Change and Lee is a Chinese proverb with a similar meaning to Tom, Dick and Harry.
