= Xiangshan District, Hsinchu =

District in Hsinchu City, Taiwan

Xiangshan 香山區
- District
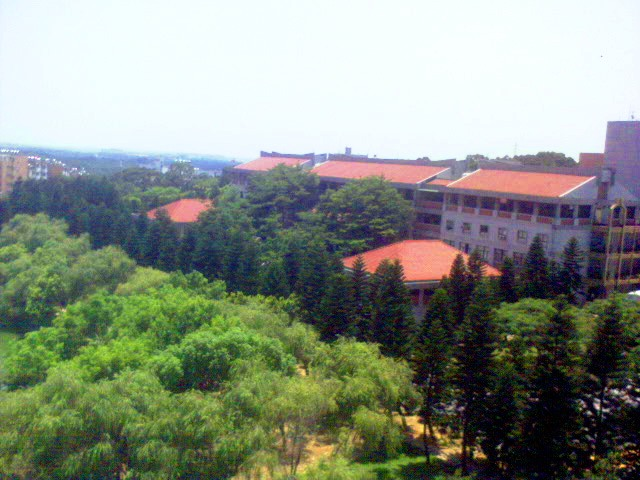

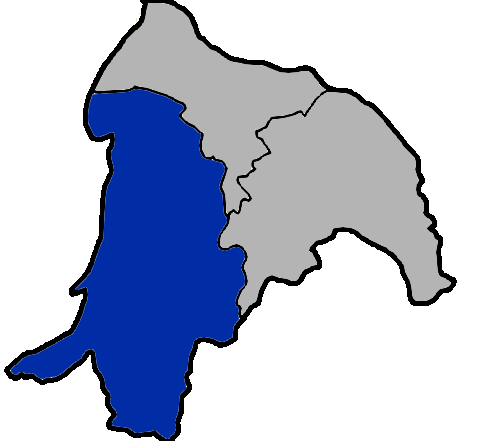
- Coordinates: 24.774578°N 120.926487°E
- Location: Hsinchu City, Taiwan

Government
  - Type: District Government

Area
  - Total: 54.85 km^{2} (21.18 sq mi)

Population (September 2023)
  - Total: 78,882
- Website: dep-s-district.hccg.gov.tw/en

Xiangshan District, Hsinchu
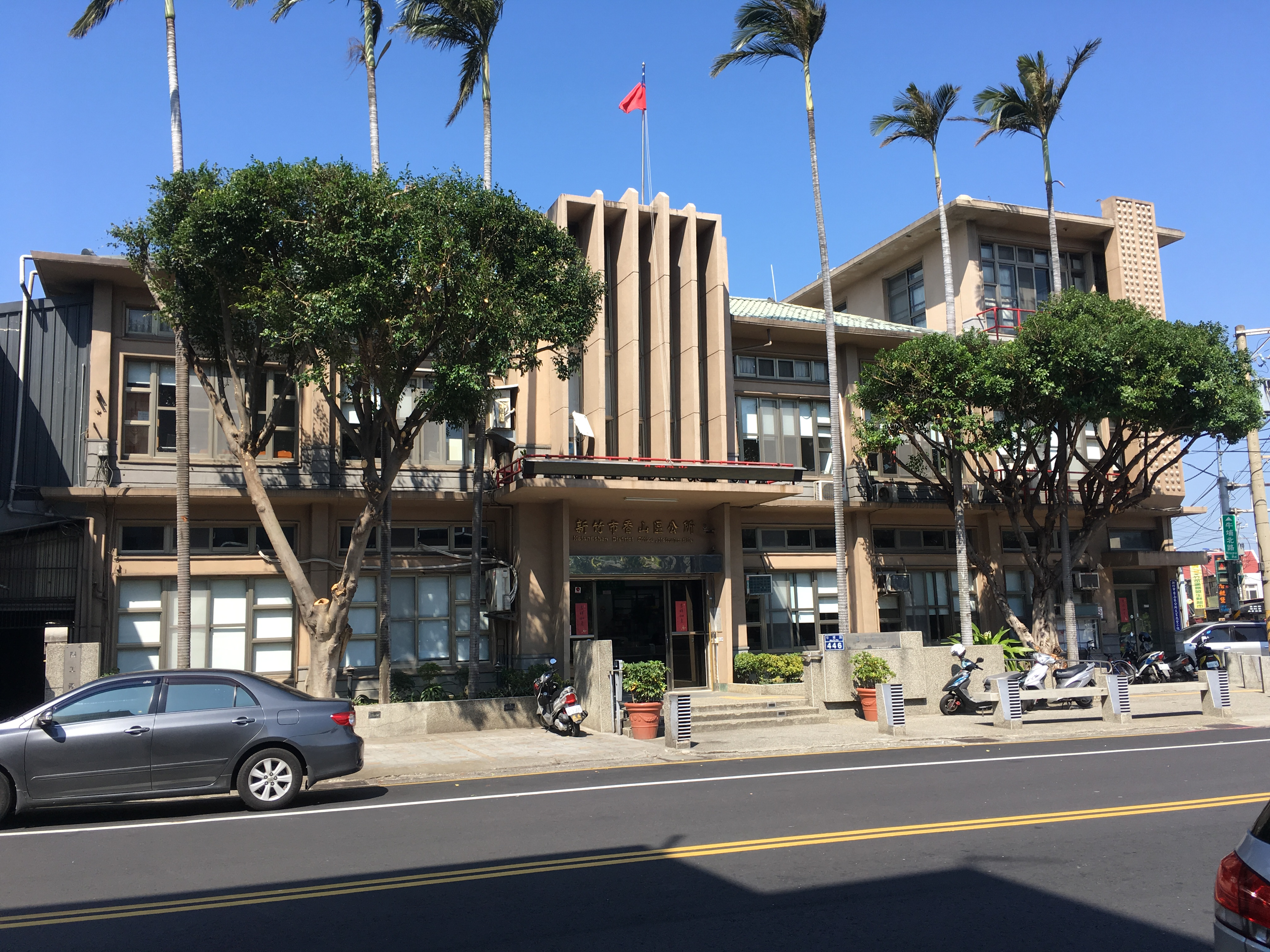
- Xiangshan District office
- Traditional Chinese: 香山區
- Simplified Chinese: 香山区
Transcriptions
Standard Mandarin
- Hanyu Pinyin: Xiāngshān Qū
- Wade–Giles: Hsiang-shan Ch‘ü

Xiangshan or Siangshan District is a district in southwest Hsinchu City, Taiwan. It is the largest of the three districts in Hsinchu City.

== History ==
Xiangshan was originally a township of Hsinchu County. On 1 July 1982, the area was incorporated into the newly formed Hsinchu City as a district.

== Geography ==
- Area: 54.85 km^{2} (21.18 sq mi)
- Population: 78,882 (September 2023)

== Administrative divisions ==
The district consists of Gangnan, Hushan, Hulin, Jinshui, Shuxia, Puqian, Zhongpu, Niupu, Dingpu, Tungxiang, Xiangcun, Xiangshan, Dazhuang, Meishan, Zhaoshan, Haishan, Jiadong, Dahu, Nanai, Zhongai, Neihu, Yanshui, Nangang and Dingfu Villages.

== Economy ==
It is most well known locally for the Hsiangshan Industrial Park and for having the major portion of Hsinchu City's "17 km (11 mi) Scenic Coastline" boardwalk.

== Education ==
=== Universities ===
- Chung Hua University
- Hsuan Chuang University
- Yuanpei University of Medical Technology

=== Schools ===
- Hsinchu International School

== Tourist attractions ==
- Haishan Fishing Port
- Hsiangshan Wetland Natural Park
- Jincheng Lake Bird Watching Zone
- Seafront Scenic Area at Kangnan

== Transportation ==
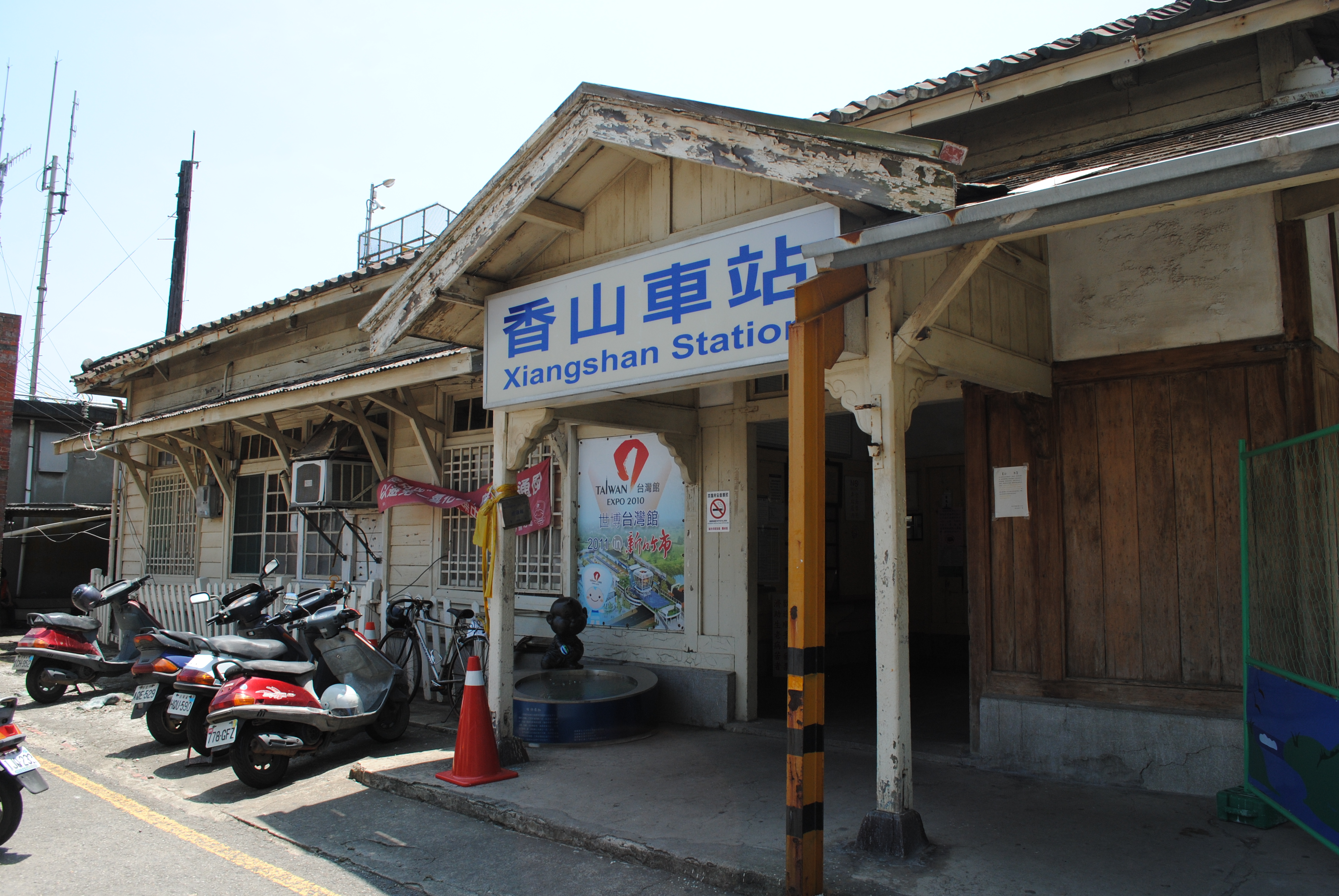
Xiangshan Station

- TR Xiangshan Station
- Local buses connect Xiangshan district to other parts of Hsinchu city, Inter-city buses also provide transport to Taipei, Taichung and Banqiao.

== Notable natives ==
- Lin Chih-chien, Mayor of Hsinchu City
