= Foreign relations of Taiwan =

Diplomatic relations between world states and the ROC Republic of China (ROC, Taiwan Area) People's Republic of China (PRC, Mainland China) Countries that have formal relations with the PRC only, having no relations at all with the ROC Countries that have formal relations with the PRC only, but have informal relations or mutual de facto embassies with the ROC's Ministry of Foreign Affairs Countries that have formal relations with the ROC only, having no formal relations with the PRC

Foreign relations of Taiwan, officially the Republic of China (ROC), are accomplished by efforts of the Ministry of Foreign Affairs, a cabinet-level ministry of the central government. As of January 2024, the ROC has formal diplomatic relations with 11 of the 193 United Nations member states and with the Holy See, which governs the Vatican City State. In addition to these relations, the ROC also maintains unofficial relations with 59 UN member states, one self-declared state (Somaliland), three territories (Guam, Hong Kong, and Macau; although, relations with the latter two have been suspended since 2021), and the European Union via its representative offices and consulates. As of 2025, the Government of the Republic of China ranked 33rd on the Diplomacy Index with 110 offices.

Historically, the ROC has required its diplomatic allies to recognize it as the sole legitimate government of "China", competing for exclusive use of the name "China" with the PRC. During the early 1970s, the ROC was replaced by the PRC as the recognized government of "China" in the UN following Resolution 2758, which also led to the ROC's loss of its key position as a permanent member on the United Nations Security Council (UNSC) to the PRC in 1971.

As international recognition of the ROC continues to dwindle concurrently with the PRC's rise as a great power, ROC foreign policy has changed into a more realistic position of actively seeking dual recognition with the PRC. For consistency with the one China policy, many international organizations that the ROC participates in use alternative names, including "Chinese Taipei" at FIFA and the International Olympic Committee (IOC), among others.

== Historical context ==
The ROC government participated in the 1943 Moscow Conference, the Dumbarton Oaks Conference, and the United Nations Conference on International Organization and was a charter member of the United Nations after participating in the alliance that won World War II. In 1949, the Nationalists lost the Chinese Civil War in mainland China and retreated to Taiwan, Penghu, Kinmen, and Matsu, forming a rump state. Despite the major loss of territory, the ROC continued to be recognized as the legitimate government of China by the UN and by many non-Communist states.

American foreign policy 1950–1971 called for full recognition and support of the government of China in Taiwan. As the Korean War (1950–1953) broke out, Taiwan was not allowed to send military support to South Korea. However, the Truman Administration resumed economic and military aid to the ROC on Taiwan and neutralized the Taiwan Strait by sending the United States Seventh Fleet to stop a Chinese Communist Party (CCP) invasion and a potential ROC counter-invasion of the mainland. In December 1954 a US-Taiwan military alliance was signed as part of the American Cold War strategy in the Far East, in the determination not to allow Chiang Kai-shek's forces on Taiwan to attack China, thereby setting off another even larger war between the United States and China.

The American military presence in Taiwan consisted of the Military Assistance Advisory Group (MAAG) and the United States Taiwan Defense Command (USTDC). Other notable units included the 327th Air Division. Until the US formally recognized the People's Republic of China in 1979, Washington provided the ROC with financial grants based on the Foreign Assistance Act, Mutual Security Act, and Act for International Development enacted by the US Congress. A separate Sino-American Mutual Defense Treaty was signed between the two governments of US and ROC in 1954 and lasted until 1979.

The US State Department's official position in 1959 was:

That the provisional capital of the Republic of China has been at Taipei, Taiwan (Formosa) since December 1949; that the Government of the Republic of China exercises authority over the island; that the sovereignty of Formosa has not been transferred to China; and that Formosa is not a part of China as a country, at least not as yet, and not until and unless appropriate treaties are hereafter entered into. Formosa may be said to be a territory or an area occupied and administered by the Government of the Republic of China, but is not officially recognized as being a part of the Republic of China.

In the past decades, the US had maintained a position to not support Taiwanese independence, and instead to have a One China policy that is guided by the Taiwan Relations Act, the three U.S.-China Joint Communiques, and the Six Assurances, and to expect cross-Strait differences to be handled peacefully, and oppose any unilateral changes to the status quo from either side.

=== 1971 expulsion from the UN ===
In 1971, the UN expelled the ROC and transferred China's seat to the People's Republic of China (PRC). In addition to the ad tempus recognition of the ROC by a majority of countries before UN Resolution 2758, the ROC lost its membership in all intergovernmental organisations related to the UN. As the UN and related organizations like the International Court of Justice are the most common venues for effective execution of international law and serve as the international community for sovereign states, a majority of the countries aligned with the West in the Cold War terminated diplomatic relations with the ROC and opened diplomatic relations with the PRC.

The United Nations Charter's Articles 23 and 110, in its Chapter II, explicitly refer to the ROC, but the seat of "China" is currently occupied by the PRC. The ROC continues to maintain substantial relations, including with most of the non-governmental organisations at the United Nations, in addition with the concern from UNESCO. The Vienna Convention on Diplomatic Relations was signed and ratified by the ROC on 18 April 1961 and 19 December 1969, including Optional Protocol concerning the Compulsory Settlement of Disputes. It is entitled by the founding of the United Nations as the cornerstone of modern-day diplomacy since the Vienna Congress, Article 35 of 1969 Vienna Convention on the Law of Treaties also applies to the ROC since 1971. Due to the ROC's insecurity and intolerance in the 1970s and 1980s after it was expelled by the UN as well as American influence, the ROC gradually democratized and adopted universal suffrage, ending under the one-party leadership of President Chiang Ching-kuo by lifting 38 years of martial law on the Communist rebellion on mainland China and establishing the new self-identity of Republic of China (system) on Taiwan in the international community, enacting Two Chinas states in the world. UN Resolution 2758 is non-binding on the international law regarding the international status of the Republic of China on Taiwan, and the ROC continues to seek opportunities to join UN Specialized agencies to become a Permanent Observer under the auspices of UN Resolution 396, which duly recommended the questions of debate on Chinese representation in the United Nations.

=== Elections ===
The first direct presidential election was held in 1996, and the incumbent President Lee Teng-hui was elected. As of 4 May 2015, ROC nationals are eligible for preferential visa treatment from 142 countries and areas. In the context of superpower and influential diplomacy, the ROC's traditional and stable allies include United States of America, Canada, Japan, Australia, and New Zealand. The ROC's cultural diplomacy includes the establishment of the Taiwan Resource Center for Chinese Studies in 2012 in major universities around the world.

=== Development assistance ===
Since 1950 Taiwan has given high priority to international aid, making its representatives welcome even in states without formal diplomatic relations. The policies provide generous aid without strict accountability conditions, especially in developing nations in Africa, Latin America, and the South Pacific. Building a reputation as a responsible and generous donor has earned it prestige, especially in contrast to the role of foreign aid in China's policies, such as the Belt and Road Initiative.

The ROC is one of the main supporters of official development assistance, with the International Cooperation and Development Fund managing ROC's Foreign Assistance and International Cooperation projects. As of 2010, along with other US security allies including Australia, New Zealand, Japan, and South Korea in the Asia-Pacific region with Taiwan Relations Act, officials of the ROC have gained quasi-official level visits to the United States both in the governmental and political level, including the Taiwanese–US cooperative military guidance in the annual Han Kuang joint-force exercises.

=== Think tanks ===
Taiwan's political system has evolved in terms of increasing political liberalization. By the 1990s, Taiwan had a democratic system with multiparty competition, factionalism, a vigorous civil society, and many interest groups. Think tanks emerged because of the high prestige of expertise and the heavy demand for unofficial diplomacy necessitated by the loss of formal diplomatic recognition. Think tanks have played a major role in planning and operationalizing relations with countries around the world.

European universities, research centers, and think tanks have developed a new academic field of Taiwan studies, especially in Europe, because of the unique status of Taiwan in the world's diplomatic system. The scholars involved have a deep commitment to Taiwan studies and have developed a Europe-wide network of scholars.

== Policies ==
=== Economics ===
The ROC's GDP was ahead of several G20 economies before 2012.

=== UN specialized agencies ===
As a non-member state of the United Nations, by participating as members in one or more United Nations Specialized Agencies and operating in a parallel political system with the CCP as in the case of Germany and Korea, the ROC may be granted a Permanent Observer status in organisations such as the IMF and World Bank.

Involvement and participation in the Asia Pacific Innovation Conference allows interaction with the Director of Economics and Statistics Division of WIPO, who directly reports to the Director-General.

=== International isolation ===
Due to "the absence of a cross-strait understanding" (1992 consensus), the ROC has encountered international isolation due to political and economic pressure from the PRC since the 1970s, and it has continued under the pro-Taiwan independence administration of the Democratic Progressive Party. Taiwan is not allowed to attend the World Health Assembly, Interpol, International Civil Aviation Organization, or the United Nations' Kimberley Process Certification Scheme. Other forms of international isolation include measures against the activities of the Chinese Taipei Olympic Committee, Golden Horse Film Festival and Awards (boycotted), and a ban on Taiwan journalists to acquire passes to United Nations and as well as UNFCCC meetings.

Analysts argue that PRC's coercive strategy might have proven counterproductive as it has further united US allies (including Australia and the UK) in their response, which in turn makes it more challenging for Beijing to achieve its intended geo-strategic objectives.

The ROC's (multi-sector) civil society currently participates in 11 projects of the United Nations Sustainable Development Goals. ROC ranks 31st of 176 countries and territories in the 2016 Transparency International's Corruption Perception Index.

== International disputes ==
The vote in the UN General Assembly on Resolution 2758 (1971) recognizing the People's Republic of China as "the only legitimate representative of China". Green = In favour, Red = Against, Blue = Abstention, Yellow = Non-voting, Grey = Non-UN-members or dependencies.

In the 1970s many countries switched diplomatic recognition from the ROC to the PRC, including the United States, Japan and Canada. In October 1971, Resolution 2758 was passed by the UN General Assembly, expelling "the representatives of Chiang Kai-shek" and transferring China's seat on the Security Council to the PRC. The resolution declared that "the representatives of the Government of the PRC are the only lawful representatives of China to the United Nations." However, the eo ipso nature of Taiwan and weapons of mass destruction remained a contentious issue.

Many attempts by the ROC to rejoin the UN have not made it past the committee, due to PRC opposition and threats of veto. President Chen Shui-bian argued that Resolution 2758, replacing the ROC with the PRC in 1971, addressed only the question of who should have China's seat in the UN rather than whether an additional seat for the Taiwan Area could be created to represent the 23 million people residing in the Taiwanese mainland and other islands.

Since the 1970s, the PRC and ROC have competed for diplomatic recognition from nations across the world, often by offering financial aid to poorer countries as an inducement. As a precondition for diplomatic relations, the PRC requires that the other country renounce any recognition of the ROC. Since the introduction of the "pragmatic diplomacy" (務實外交; Wùshí wàijiāo) policy in 1991, the ROC has not insisted on consideration as the sole representative of China, and does not require nations that recognize it to end their relations with the PRC. For example, when Saint Lucia chose to recognize the ROC in 2007, Foreign Minister Rufus Bousquet said the decision "should not be construed as a severance of our relationship with the PRC". However, the PRC responds to foreign recognitions of the ROC by suspending relations with the other country.

On less official terms, the ROC is involved in South China Sea disputes over control of the Spratly Islands with China, Malaysia, the Philippines, Vietnam, and Brunei; and over the Paracel Islands, occupied by China, but claimed by Vietnam and by the ROC. The ROC government also claims the Senkaku Islands.

On October 14, 2024, China launched extensive military exercises near Taiwan in response to President Lai Ching-te's recent speech. Taiwan strongly criticized the move, and the U.S. raised concerns over rising tensions, with the drills marking part of China's broader pressure strategy.

== Types of relations ==
=== Full diplomatic relations ===
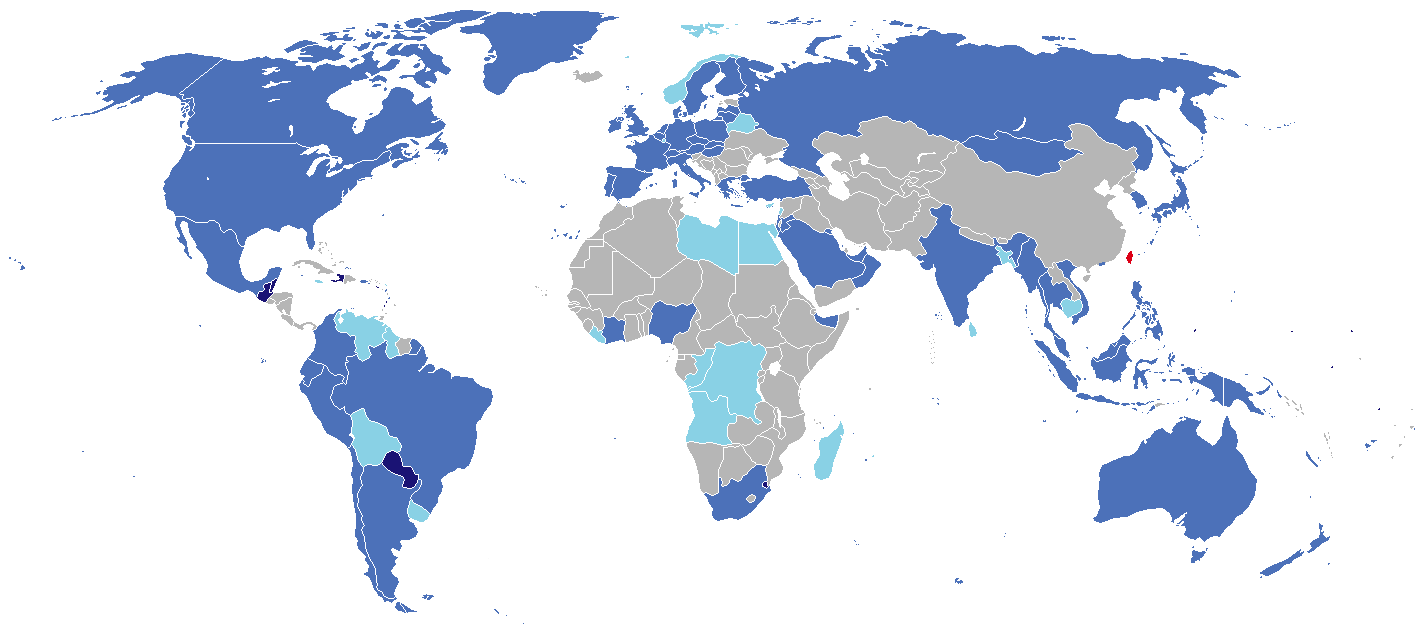
Republic of China area of actual control Countries with Republic of China embassies Countries and regions with representative offices of the Republic of China Countries and regions with representative offices abolished

The Republic of China (Taiwan) currently has full diplomatic relations with 12 countries, including 11 United Nations members and the Holy See (Vatican City), a United Nations General Assembly observer.

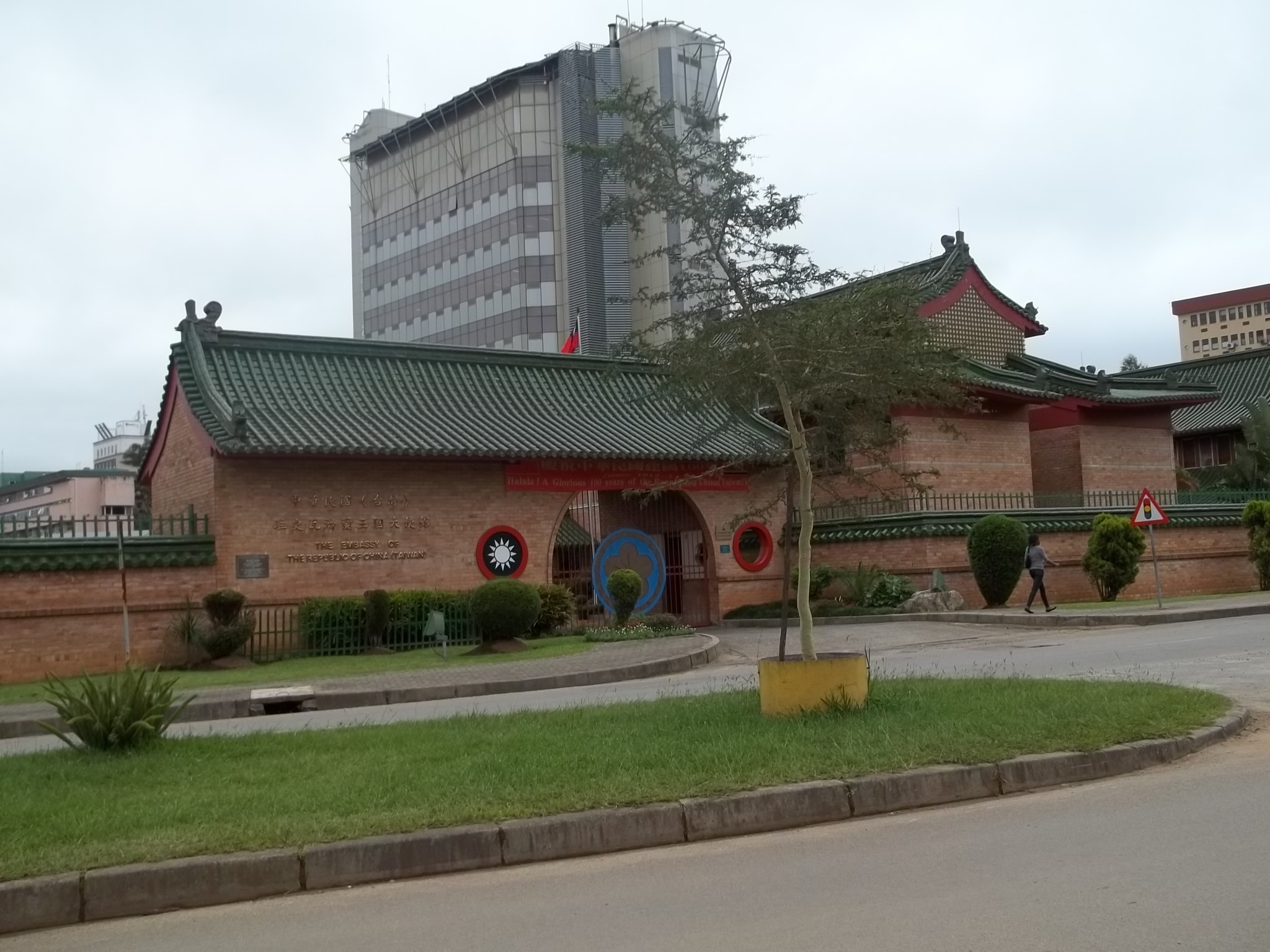
The ROC embassy in Mbabane, Eswatini

Countries with full diplomatic relations with the Republic of China (Taiwan)
State	UN region	UN subregion	Relations established
Belize	Americas	Central America	1989
Eswatini	Africa	Southern Africa	1968
Guatemala	Americas	Central America	1933
Haiti	Americas	Caribbean	1956
Holy See (Vatican City)	Europe	Southern Europe	1942
Marshall Islands	Oceania	Micronesia	1998
Palau	Oceania	Micronesia	1999
Paraguay	Americas	South America	1957
Saint Kitts and Nevis	Americas	Caribbean	1983
Saint Lucia	Americas	Caribbean	1984–1997, 2007
Saint Vincent and the Grenadines	Americas	Caribbean	1981
Tuvalu	Oceania	Polynesia	1979

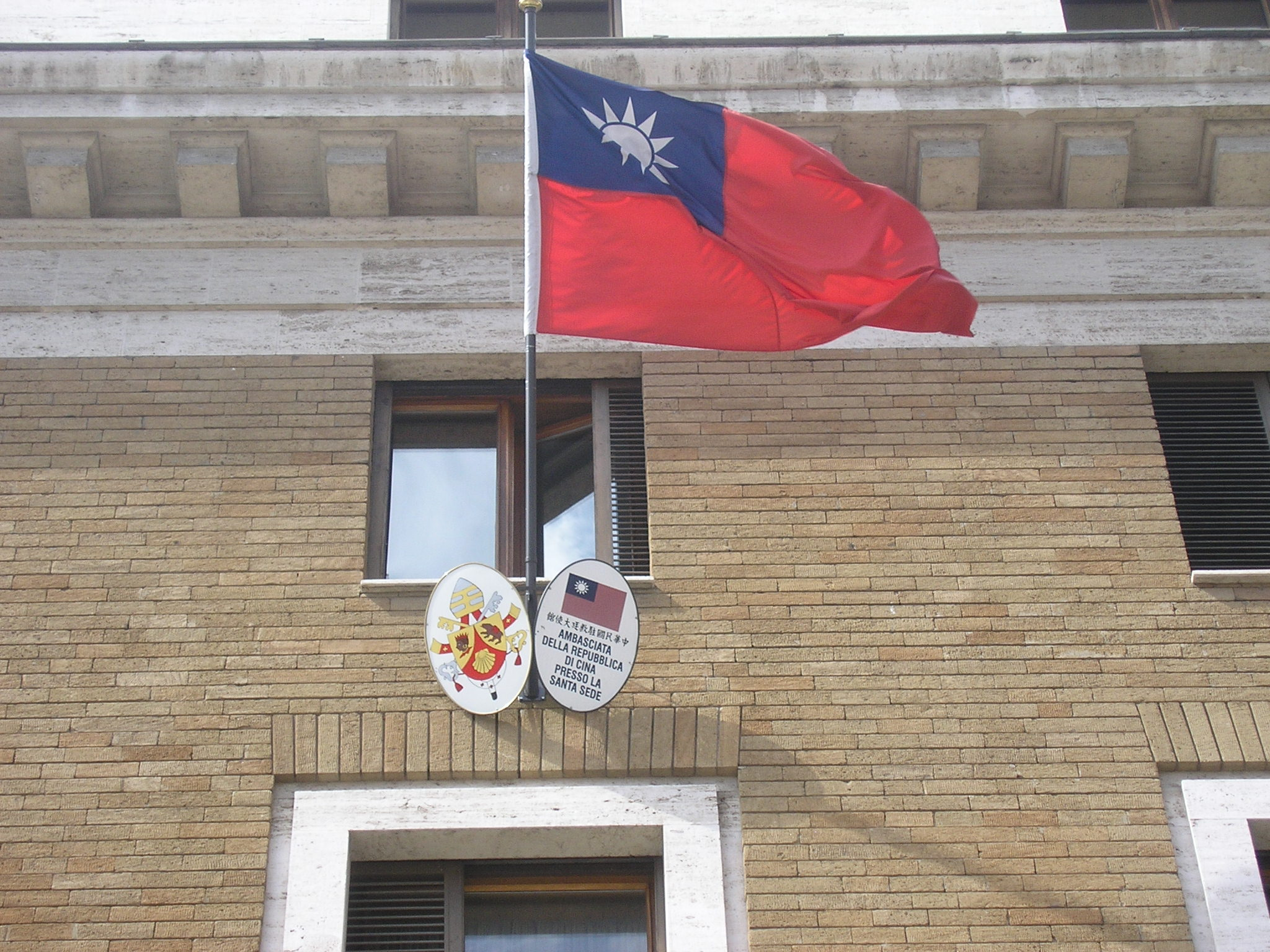
Due to the limited size of Vatican City, all embassies accredited to the Holy See are located in Rome, outside the borders of Vatican City. Hence, the ROC's embassy to the Holy See is located in Italy, a country that does not officially recognize, but still maintains close unofficial links with, the ROC.

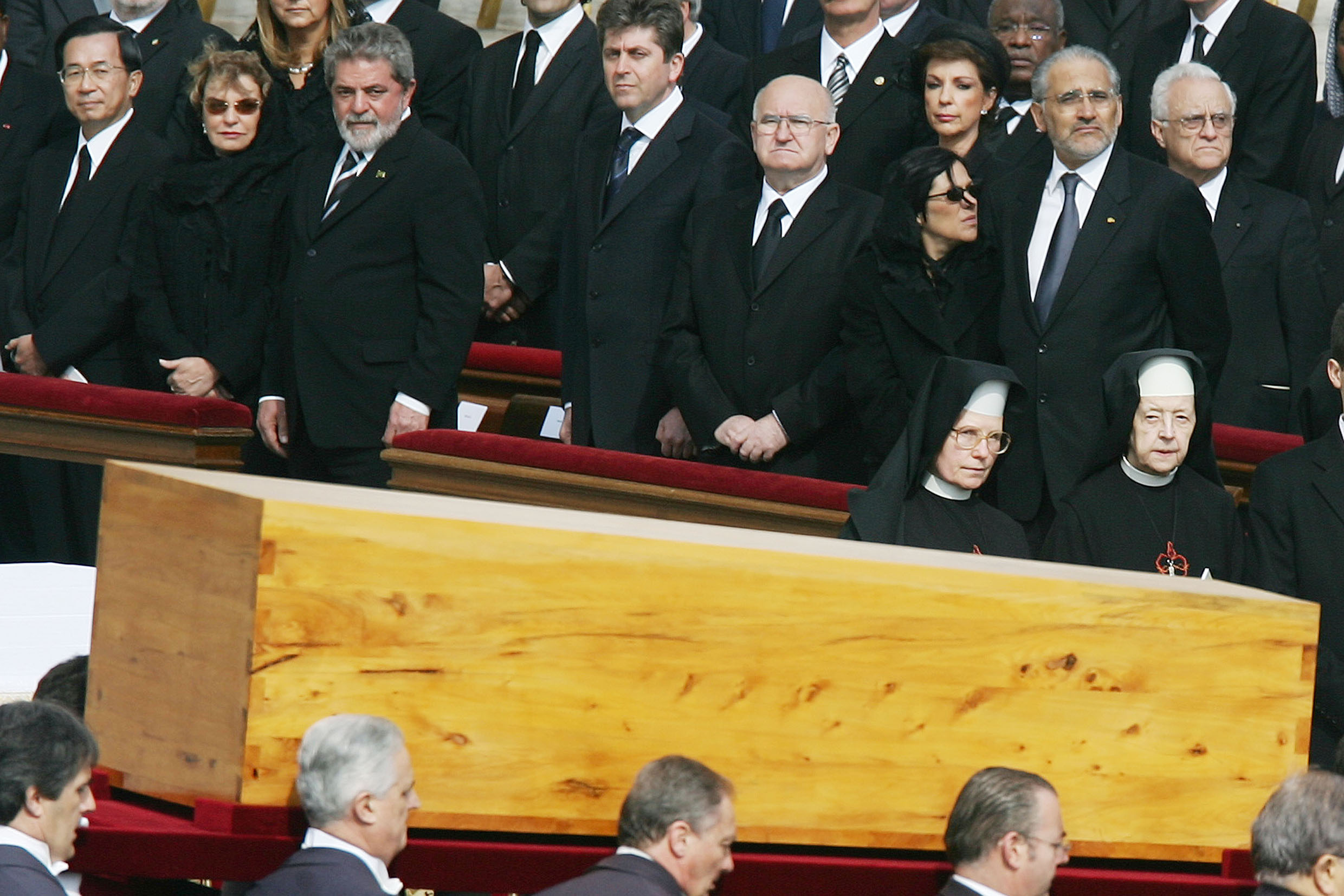
President Chen Shui-bian (far left) attended the funeral of Pope John Paul II, and as the Holy See's recognised head of state of China, was seated in the first row in alphabetical order beside the first lady and president of Brazil.

=== Non-diplomatic representation ===
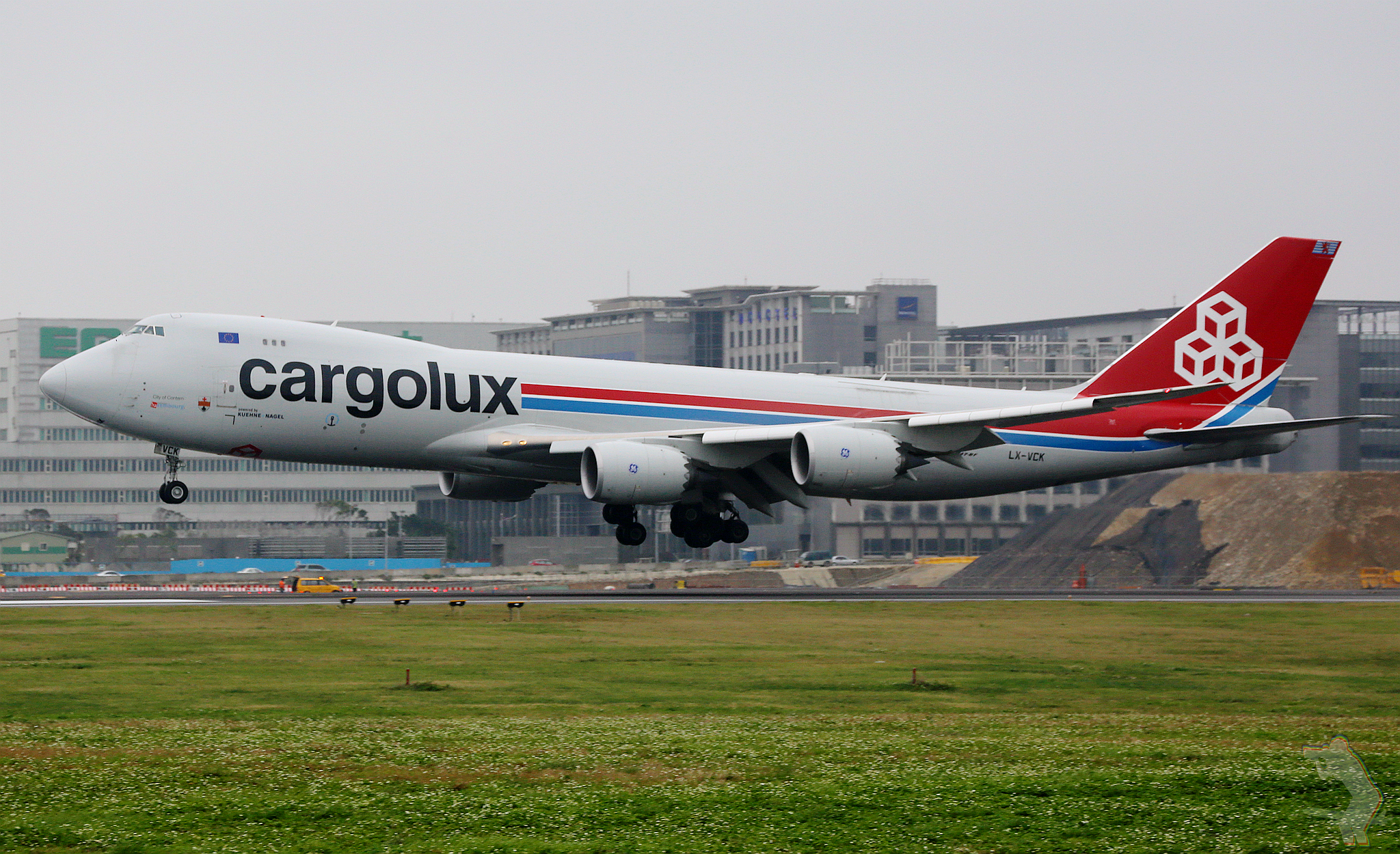
Luxembourg aircraft in Taiwan

A certain number of countries have official diplomatic relations with the PRC but also maintain some form of unofficial diplomatic relations with Taiwan. This number includes 59 sovereign states, 3 dependent or quasi-dependent territories, and the European Union.

Unofficial diplomatic relations typically involve an "Economic, Trade and Cultural Office" in Taiwan for the partner country, as well as a corresponding "Taipei/Taiwan/ROC Representative Office" representing Taiwan within the partner country. These unofficial offices generally function as embassies despite not being officially named as such. For example, the American Institute in Taiwan functions as the United States' de facto embassy, with the chairman and staff acting as unofficial government consulate officers who nevertheless perform duties that official embassies would undertake.

Various countries host Taiwanese representative offices within themselves but do not have representative offices in Taiwan. One country, Luxembourg, has a representative office in Taiwan but does not host a Taiwanese representative office within itself; Taiwan's interests in Luxembourg are served by the Taipei Representative Office in the EU and Belgium. Taiwan also regards the European Union, with which it also has unofficial relations via the Taipei Representative Office in the EU and Belgium, as a state entity in the context of international relations; the EU is a supranational union with a high level of integration between its member states, though each member state retains its national sovereignty.

Taiwan has unofficial diplomatic relations with Hong Kong and Macau, both of which are Special Administrative Regions of the PRC, though Taiwan does not have such relations with Mainland China (the PRC). Technically, Hong Kong and Macau are integral territories of the PRC, governed under the "One Country, Two Systems" framework. This means that Taiwan effectively has unofficial relations with parts of the PRC but not with the national government of the PRC itself. Taiwan maintains hostile relations with the PRC through the Mainland Affairs Council, whose counterpart is the Taiwan Affairs Office; neither office is considered to be an embassy by either Taiwan or the PRC, and both offices are operated within the home country rather than within the host country.

Taiwan has strong unofficial relations with Somaliland, which is a self-declared state in the Horn of Africa that is claimed as the territory of neighbouring Somalia, in a state of affairs that displays strong parallels to Taiwan's own sovereignty dispute with China.

Taiwan maintains a "Taiwan Economic and Cultural Office" in Guam, which is an unincorporated organized territory of the United States located in Oceania.

In 2021, Lithuania announced that it would open an unofficial representative office in Taiwan, and Taiwan likewise announced that it would open an unofficial representative office in Lithuania. The Lithuania office was due to open by fall (autumn) of 2021 in the Northern Hemisphere, which is essentially September to November inclusive. Relations between Lithuania and the PRC have simultaneously soured.

A certain number of countries have indirect unofficial diplomatic relations with Taiwan via third-party proxy countries. For example, the Taipei Liaison Office in the Republic of South Africa serves the interests of Taiwan throughout a great number of countries in Africa that otherwise do not have any channels of communication with Taiwan.

Africa (3 states and 1 de facto state)

- Ivory Coast
- Nigeria
- South Africa
- Somaliland (de facto state)

Asia (20 states and 2 territories)

- Bahrain
- Brunei
- China (no direct relations with Mainland China)
  - Hong Kong (SAR of the PRC)
  - Macau (SAR of the PRC)
- India
- Indonesia
- Israel
- Japan
- Jordan
- Kuwait
- Malaysia
- Mongolia
- Myanmar
- Oman
- Philippines
- Saudi Arabia
- Singapore
- South Korea
- Thailand
- Turkey
- United Arab Emirates
- Vietnam

Europe (23 states and 1 supranational union)

- European Union (supranational union)
  - Austria
  - Belgium
  - Czech Republic
  - Denmark
  - Finland
  - France
  - Germany
  - Greece
  - Hungary
  - Ireland
  - Italy
  - Latvia
  - Lithuania (Taiwanese office opened in November 2021, first one in the world to adopt the name "Taiwanese").
  - Luxembourg (has an office in Taipei, Taipei does not have an office in Luxembourg; representation through Belgium and the EU)
  - Netherlands
  - Poland
  - Portugal
  - Slovakia (has an Economic and Cultural Office in Taipei, Taiwan has Representative Office in Bratislava)
  - Spain
  - Sweden
- Russia
- Switzerland
- United Kingdom

North America (3 states)

- Canada
- Mexico
- United States

Oceania (4 states)

- Australia
- Fiji
- New Zealand
- Papua New Guinea

South America (6 states)

- Argentina
- Brazil
- Chile
- Colombia
- Ecuador
- Peru

=== No representation ===
The following states recognize Beijing and have no representation in Taiwan (including any non-political, non-diplomatic, non-intergovernmental representation):

Africa (50 states)

- Algeria
- Angola
- Benin
- Botswana
- Burkina Faso
- Burundi
- Cameroon
- Cape Verde
- Central African Republic
- Chad
- Comoros
- Congo, Democratic Republic of the
- Congo, Republic of the
- Djibouti
- Egypt
- Equatorial Guinea
- Eritrea
- Ethiopia
- Gabon
- Gambia
- Ghana
- Guinea
- Guinea-Bissau
- Kenya
- Lesotho
- Liberia
- Libya
- Madagascar
- Malawi
- Mali
- Mauritania
- Mauritius
- Morocco
- Mozambique
- Namibia
- Niger
- Rwanda
- São Tomé and Príncipe
- Senegal
- Seychelles
- Sierra Leone
- Somalia
- South Sudan
- Sudan
- Tanzania
- Togo
- Tunisia
- Uganda
- Zambia
- Zimbabwe

Asia (24 states)

- Afghanistan
- Armenia
- Azerbaijan
- Bangladesh
- Cambodia
- Georgia
- Iran
- Iraq
- Kazakhstan
- Kyrgyzstan
- Laos
- Lebanon
- Maldives
- Nepal
- North Korea
- Pakistan
- Qatar
- Sri Lanka
- Syria
- Tajikistan
- Timor-Leste
- Turkmenistan
- Uzbekistan
- Yemen

Europe (22 states)

- Albania
- Andorra
- Belarus
- Bosnia and Herzegovina
- Bulgaria
- Croatia
- Cyprus
- Estonia
- Iceland
- Liechtenstein
- Malta
- Moldova
- Monaco
- Montenegro
- North Macedonia
- Norway
- Romania
- San Marino
- Serbia
- Slovenia
- Ukraine

North America (13 states)

- Antigua and Barbuda
- Bahamas
- Barbados
- Costa Rica
- Cuba
- Dominica
- Dominican Republic
- El Salvador
- Grenada
- Honduras
- Jamaica
- Nicaragua
- Panama
- Trinidad and Tobago

Oceania (9 states)

- Cook Islands (state in free association with New Zealand)
- Kiribati
- Micronesia
- Nauru
- Niue (state in free association with New Zealand)
- Samoa
- Solomon Islands
- Tonga
- Vanuatu

South America (5 states)

- Bolivia
- Guyana
- Suriname
- Uruguay
- Venezuela

=== Relations with neither the ROC nor the PRC ===
A certain number of countries and a sovereign entity do not possess full diplomatic relations with either the ROC or the PRC. This includes one member state of the United Nations, seven de facto states, and one non-territorial sovereign entity (Sovereign Military Order of Malta).

Out of the seven de facto states that do not possess full diplomatic relations with Taiwan, one of them, Somaliland, has strong unofficial relations with Taiwan, while another, Kosovo, has been unilaterally recognized by Taiwan but does not recognize Taiwan in return. The other five de facto states have not been recognized by Taiwan diplomatically.

The Sovereign Military Order of Malta is a non-territorial sovereign entity; it claims and controls no territory, it does not consider itself to be a state, and yet it considers itself to be sovereign. The Order of Malta maintains full diplomatic relations with 110 sovereign states (including the Holy See), official relations with five other sovereign states, and ambassador-level relations with the European Union. The Order of Malta does not maintain full diplomatic relations with either Taiwan or the PRC. Even though the Order of Malta does not maintain full diplomatic relations with Taiwan, it has been involved in supporting Taiwan's participation in the UN-affiliated World Health Assembly during the COVID-19 pandemic.

Bhutan is the only member state of the United Nations that does not have full diplomatic relations with either the ROC or the PRC, though Bhutan recognizes PRC's sovereignty over Taiwan. The ROC has unilaterally recognized Bhutan as a sovereign state.

States without relations with the People's Republic of China or the Republic of China
State or sovereign entity	Recognized by the ROC	Unofficial relations	Notes
Abkhazia	No	No	Currently recognized by 4 UN member states and two non-UN-member states. Claimed by Georgia.
Bhutan	Yes	No	A United Nations member state. The ROC recognizes Bhutan as a sovereign state. Bhutan though recognizes PRC's sovereignty over Taiwan.
Kosovo	Yes	No	Currently recognized by 110 UN member states and three non-UN-member states. Claimed by Serbia.
Northern Cyprus	No	No	Recognized only by Turkey. Claimed by the Republic of Cyprus.
Pridnestrovian Moldavian Republic (Transnistria)	No	No	Claimed by Moldova.
Sahrawi Arab Democratic Republic (Western Sahara)	No	No	Currently recognised by 46 UN member states and one non-UN-member state. Also known as Western Sahara. Claimed by Morocco.
Somaliland	Yes	Yes	Taiwan and Somaliland mutually established representative offices on 1 July 2020. Claimed by Somalia.
South Ossetia (Alania)	No	No	Currently recognised by 4 UN member states and three non-UN-member states. Claimed by Georgia.
Sovereign Military Order of Malta	Yes	No	Non-territorial sovereign entity. No position on Taiwanese sovereignty. Engages neutrally with Taiwan.
Tibet (defunct)	No	No	Former de facto independent state claimed by the ROC. Annexed by the PRC in 1951.

=== Relations switched from the ROC to the PRC ===
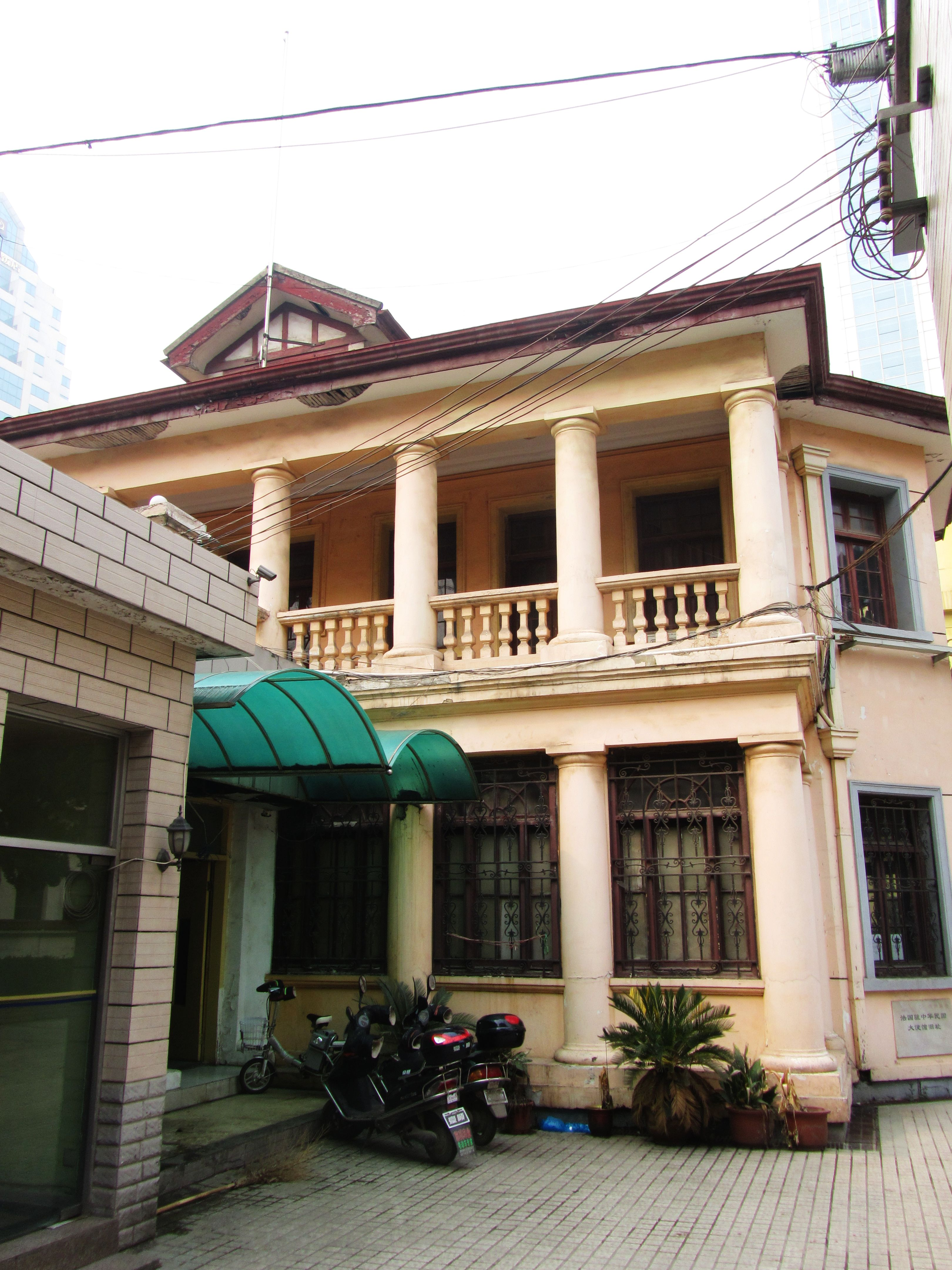
Former French Embassy to the ROC in Nanjing

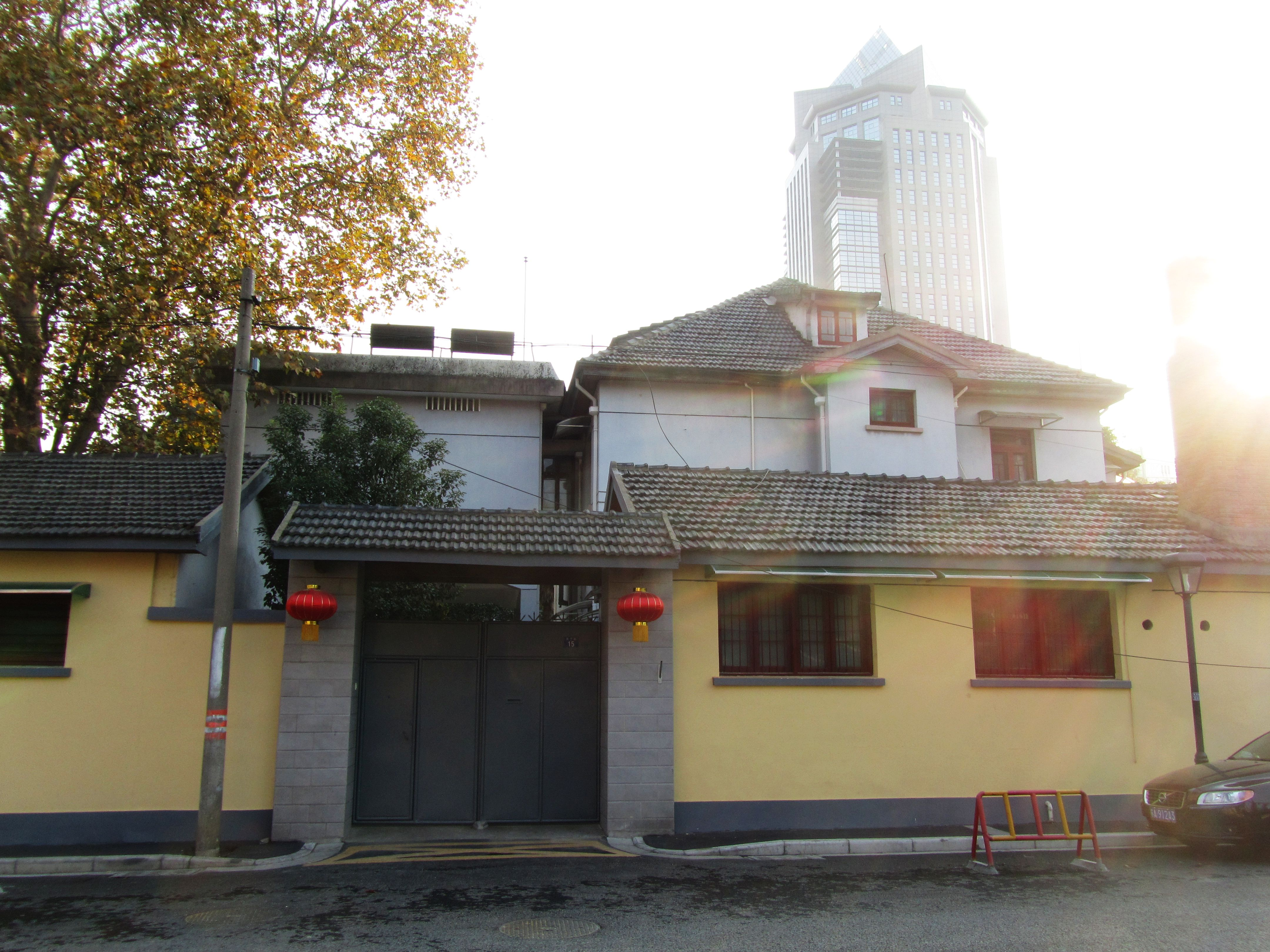
Former Mexican Embassy to the ROC in Nanjing

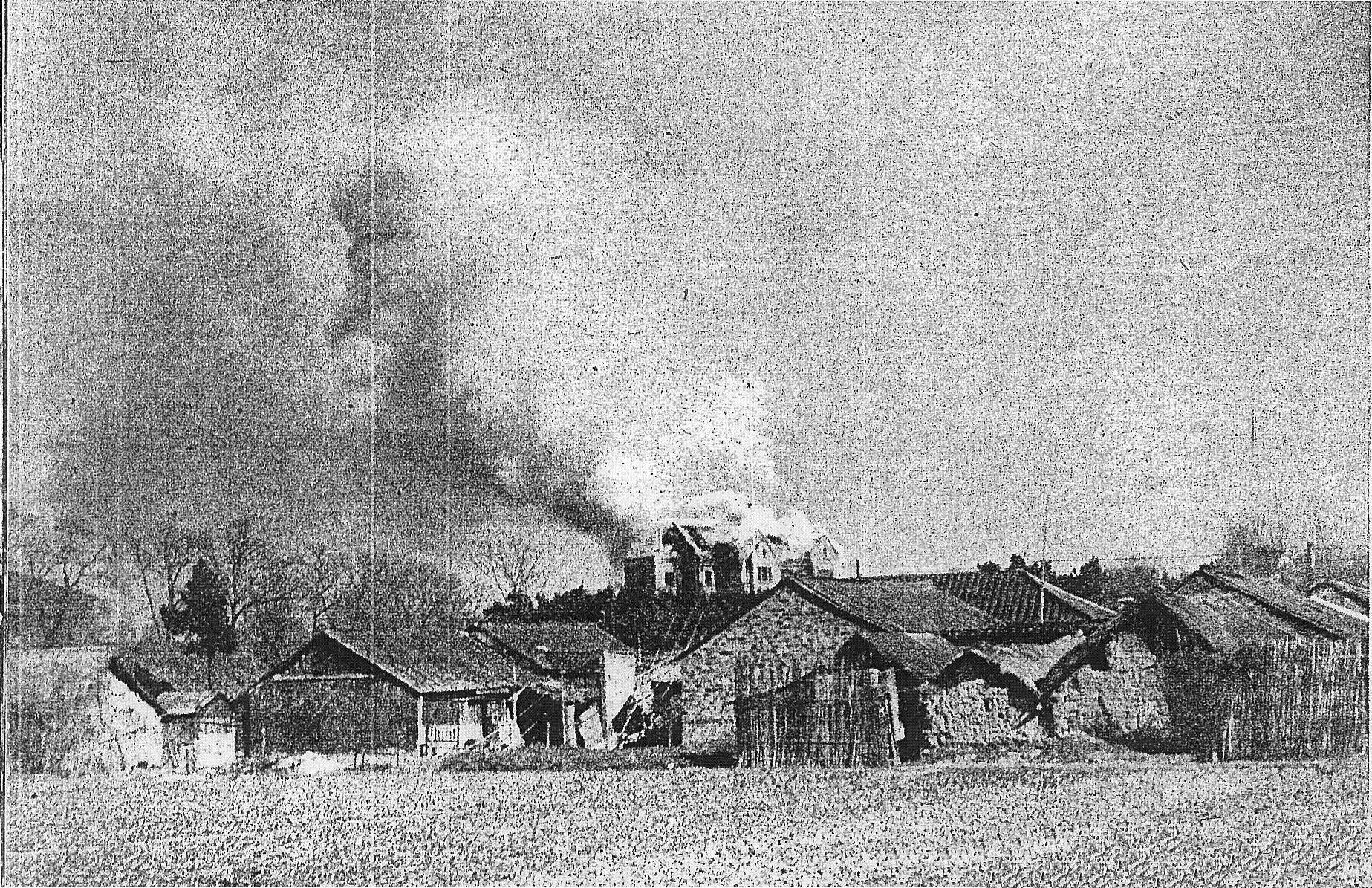
Former Soviet Union Embassy to the ROC in Nanjing

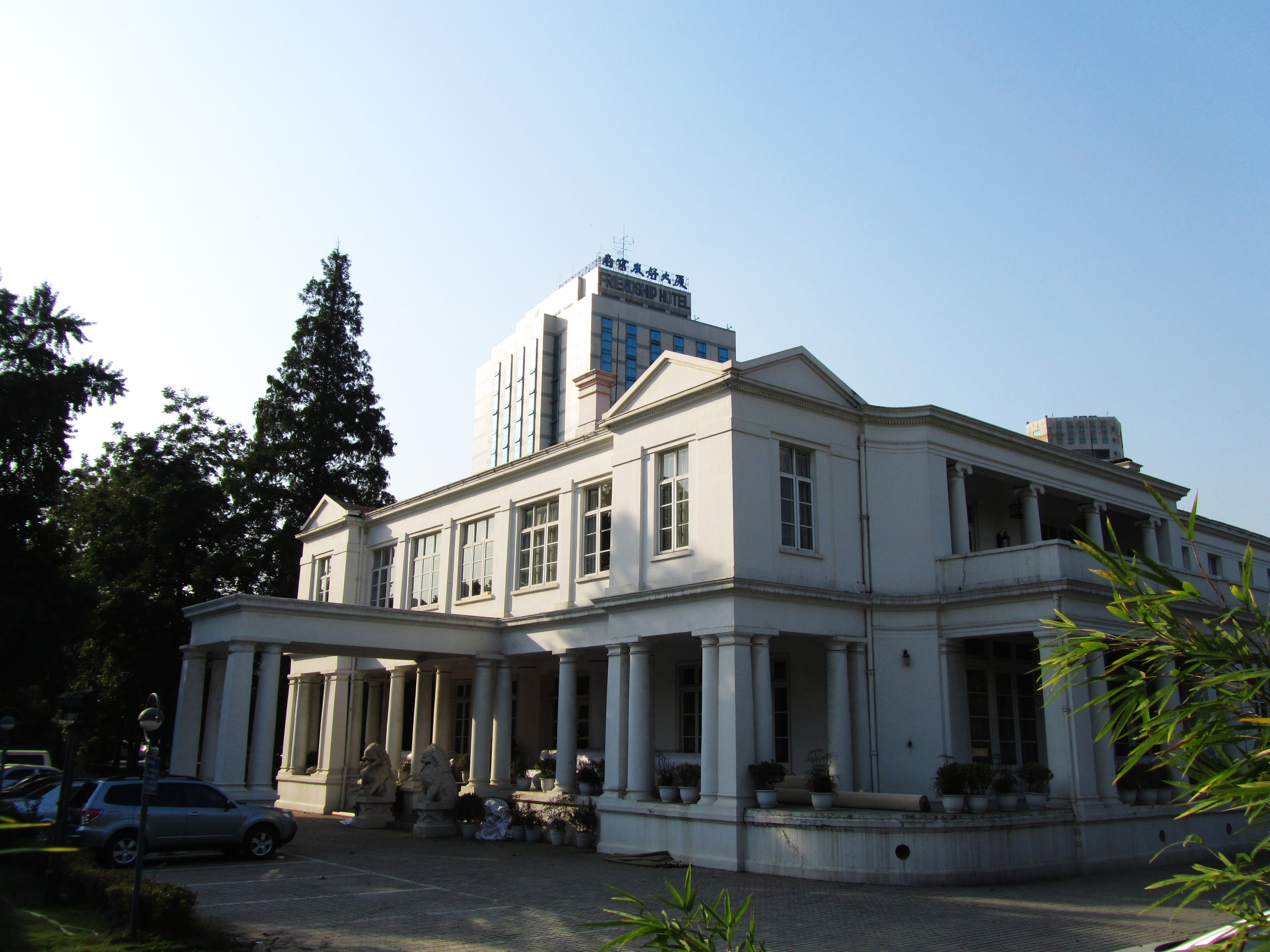
Former United Kingdom Embassy to the ROC in Nanjing

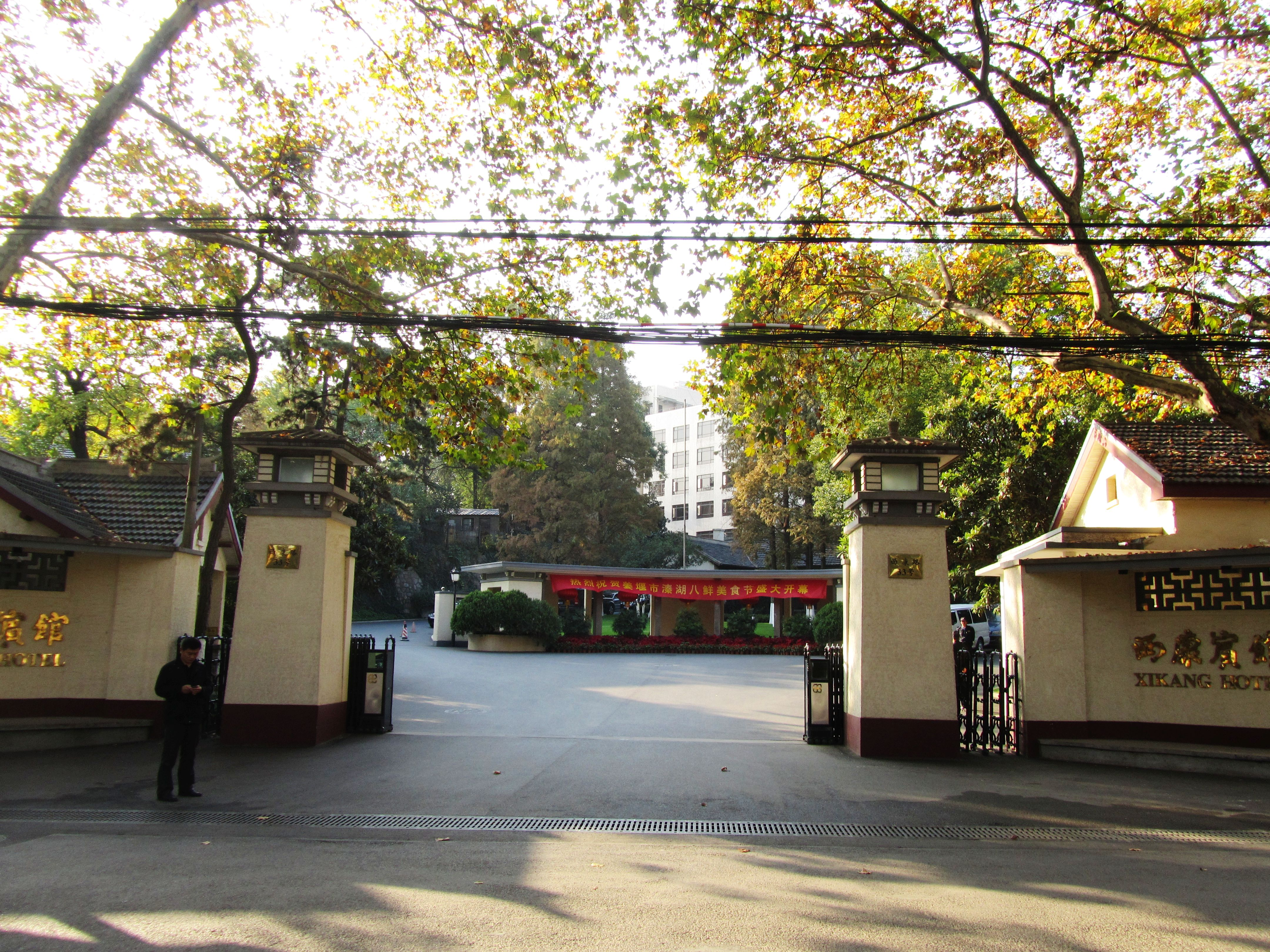
Former United States Embassy to the ROC in Nanjing

Taiwanese academics stated that if any one state switches its diplomatic relations to the PRC, it would create a domino effect, encouraging other states to do so as well. The Holy See (Vatican), the only European state that has diplomatic relations with Taiwan, made efforts in 2007 to create formal ties with the PRC. High-ranking bishops in the Catholic Church have implied that such a diplomatic move was possible, predicated on the PRC's granting more freedom of religion and interfering less in the hierarchy of the Catholic Church in China.

States formerly recognizing the Republic of China and now recognizing the People's Republic of China
	Period of diplomatic relation	
State	From	To
Afghanistan	1944	1950
Argentina	1945	1972
Australia	1941	1972
Austria	1928	1971
Barbados	1967	1977
Bahamas	1989	1997
Belgium	1928	1971
Bolivia	1919	1985
Botswana	1966	1974
Brazil	1928	1974
Bulgaria	1947	1949
Burkina Faso (formerly Upper Volta)	1961	1973
Burkina Faso (formerly Upper Volta)	1994	2018
Burma	1948	1950
Cambodia	1953	1958
Cambodia	1970	1975
Cameroon	1960	1971
Canada	1912	1970
Central African Republic	1962	1964
Central African Republic	1968	1976
Central African Republic	1991	1998
Ceylon (now Sri Lanka)	1948	1950
Chad	1962	1972
Chad	1997	2006
Chile	1915	1971
Colombia	1941	1980
Congo-Brazzaville	1960	1964
Costa Rica	1941	2007
Cuba	1913	1960
Cyprus	1960	1972
Czechoslovakia	1930	1949 (Note: Unofficial relations between the ROC continued on between the newly-formed Czechia and Slovakia in 1993.)
Dahomey (now Benin)	1960	1965
Dahomey (now Benin)	1966	1973
Denmark	1928	1950
Dominica	1983	2004
Dominican Republic	1941	2018
Ecuador	1946	1971
Egypt	1942	1956
El Salvador	1941	2018
Estonia	1937	1940
Finland	1919	1950
France	1928	1964
Gabon	1960	1974
Gambia	1968	1974
Gambia	1995	2013
Germany (West Germany)	1955	1972
Greece	1929	1972
Grenada	1989	2005
Guinea-Bissau	1990	1998
Honduras	1941	2023
India	1947	1949
Iran	1920	1971
Iraq	1942	1958
Italy	1928	1970
Ivory Coast	1963	1983
Jamaica	1962	1972
Japan	1930	1937
Japan	1952	1972
Jordan	1957	1977
Kiribati	2003	2019
Korea, Republic of (South Korea)	1949	1992
Kuwait	1963	1971
Laos	1958	1962
Latvia	1936	1940
Latvia	1992	1994
Lebanon	1954	1971
Lesotho	1966	1983
Lesotho	1990	1994
Liberia	1957	1977
Liberia	1989	1993
Liberia	1997	2003
Libya	1959	1978
Lithuania	1921	1940
Luxembourg	1949	1972
Madagascar	1960	1972
Malawi	1966	2008
Malaysia	1964	1974
Maldives	1966	1972
Malta	1967	1972
Mauritania	1960	1965
Mexico	1928	1971
Nauru	1980	2002
Nauru	2005	2024
Netherlands	1928	1950
New Zealand	1912	1972
Nicaragua	1930	1985
Nicaragua	1990	2021
Niger	1963	1974
Niger	1992	1996
North Macedonia	1999	2001
Norway	1928	1950
Pakistan	1947	1950
Panama	1912	2017
Papua New Guinea	5 August 1999	21 August 1999 (Note: Recognition lasted sixteen days. Began 5 August, agreement withdrawn 21 August.)
Peru	1913	1971
Philippines	1947	1975
Poland	1929	1949
Portugal	1928	1975
Romania	1939	1949
Rwanda	1962	1972
São Tomé and Príncipe	1997	2016
Saudi Arabia	1946	1990
Senegal	1960	1964
Senegal	1969	1972
Senegal	1996	2005
Sierra Leone	1963	1971
Solomon Islands	1983	2019
South Africa	1912	1998
South Vietnam (now defunct)	1955	1975 (Note: Diplomatic relationship between South Vietnam and Taiwan ceased upon the collapse of the South Vietnamese government in 1975.)
Soviet Union (now defunct)	1929	1949
Spain	1928	1973
Sweden	1928	1950
Switzerland	1913	1950
Thailand	1946	1975
Togo	1960	1972
Tonga	1972	1998
Turkey	1934	1971
United Kingdom	1928	1950
United States	1928	1979
Uruguay	1957	1988
Vanuatu	3 November 2004	10 November 2004 (Note: Recognition lasted seven days. Began on 03 November, agreement withdrawn on 10 November.)
Venezuela	1941	1974
Western Samoa	1972	1975
Yugoslavia (now defunct)	1945	1955
Zaire	1960	1973

=== States that have never had diplomatic relations with the ROC but have relations with the PRC ===
States only ever recognizing the People's Republic of China as the Chinese state
State	Year recognized the PRC
Albania	1949
Algeria	1962
Andorra	1994
Angola	1982
Antigua and Barbuda	1983
Armenia	1992
Azerbaijan	1992
Bahrain	1989
Bangladesh	1975
Belarus	1992
Bosnia and Herzegovina	1995
Brunei	1991
Burundi	1963
Cabo Verde	1976
Comoros	1975
Cook Islands	1997
Croatia	1992
Djibouti	1979
East Germany (now defunct)	1949
Equatorial Guinea	1970
Eritrea	1993
Ethiopia	1970
Fiji	1975
Georgia	1992
Ghana	1957
Guyana	1972
Hungary	1949
Iceland	1971
Indonesia	1950
Ireland	1979
Israel	1950
Kazakhstan	1992
Kenya	1963
Kyrgyzstan	1992
Liechtenstein	1950
Mali	1960
Mauritius	1972
Micronesia	1989
Moldova	1992
Mongolia	1949
Monaco	1995
Montenegro	2006
Morocco	1958
Mozambique	1975
Namibia	1990
Nepal	1955
Nigeria	1971
Niue	2007
North Korea	1949
Oman	1978
Qatar	1988
San Marino	1971
Seychelles	1976
Singapore	1990
Slovenia	1992
Somalia	1960
Sudan	1958
South Sudan	2011
South Yemen (now defunct)	1968
Suriname	1976
Syria	1956
Tajikistan	1992
Tanzania	1961 (Tanganyika); 1963 (Zanzibar)
Timor-Leste	2002
Trinidad and Tobago	1974
Tunisia	1964
Turkmenistan	1992
Uganda	1962
United Arab Emirates	1984
Ukraine	1992
Uzbekistan	1992
Vietnam	1950
Yemen	1956
Zambia	1964
Zimbabwe	1980

=== Bribery allegations ===
Taiwan has been accused on multiple occasions of bribing foreign politicians to commence or maintain diplomatic relations. The ex-president of Guatemala admitted in a U.S. court taking $2.5m from Taiwan in exchange for continuing to recognize it diplomatically. Regarding Taiwanese "dollar diplomacy" in Vanuatu a 2004 observer said: "the methods Taiwan uses, bribing countries and politicians, are unjust, violate international law and disturb the global community. Bribery diplomacy won't last." Prior to Nauru choosing to recognize the government of the People's Republic of China, Taiwan had provided Nauruan government ministers with a monthly stipend of $5,000 in exchange for continuation of the Pacific island country's diplomatic relations with Taipei. Nauruan politicians, including President Marcus Stephen received secret funds. Other MPs received $2,500 a month in what was described as project funding that requires minimal accounting.

== History ==
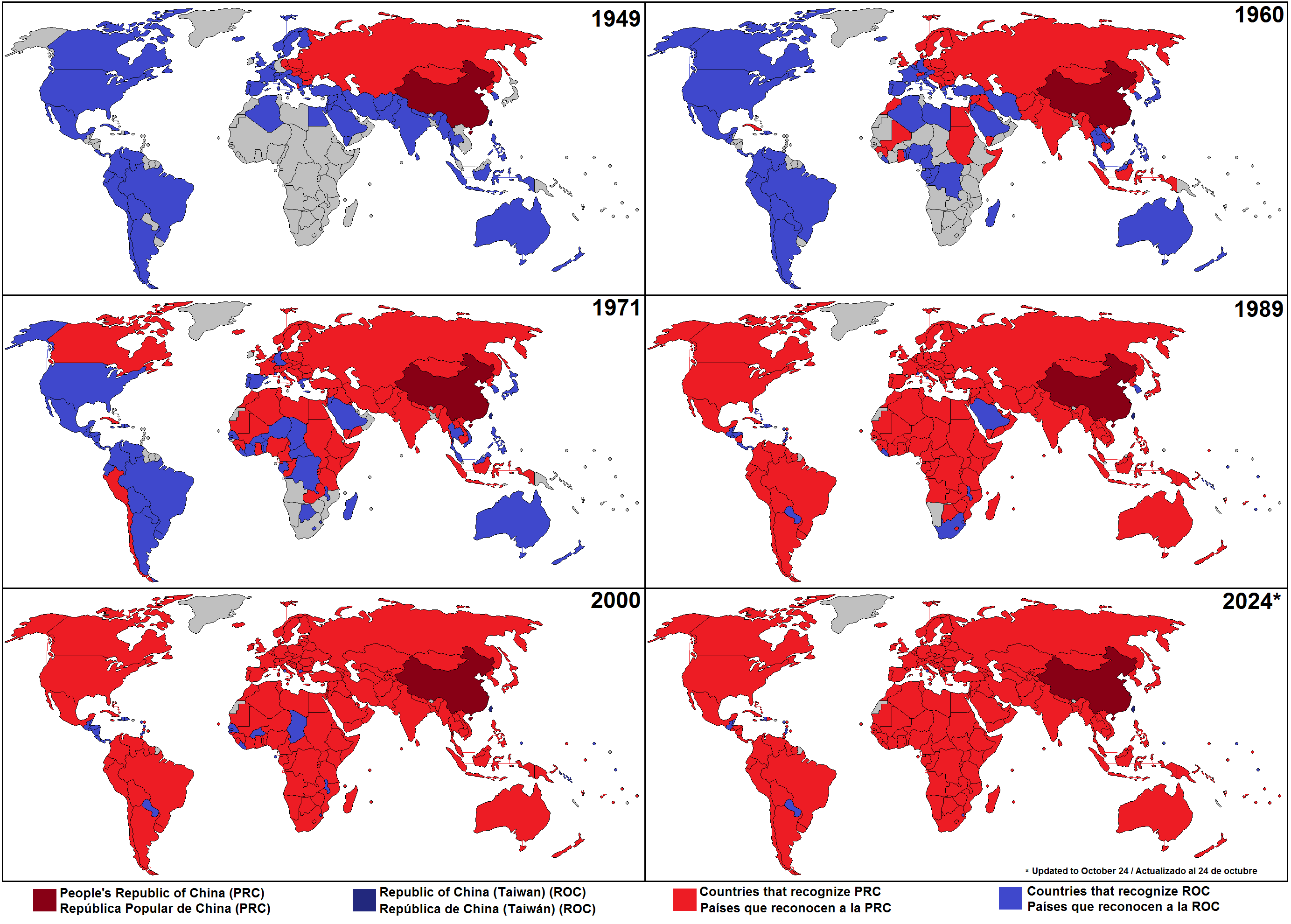
A series of maps that illustrate the struggle between the People's Republic of China and Republic of China for international recognition

Taiwan was annexed by Japan in 1895 after the First Sino-Japanese War. In the Northern Expedition, the Nationalists defeated the warlords of the Beiyang clique and established a unified government for China in Nanjing. The United States recognised Republic of China (ROC) on 25 July 1928, the first government to do so. The Japanese occupied parts of China during World War II. After Japan's defeat in 1945, Taiwan was placed under the temporary administration of the ROC to handle the surrender of Japanese administration. The Chinese Civil War broke out again between the Nationalists and the CCP. The CCP gained control of the mainland in 1949 and proclaimed the People's Republic of China (PRC), while the Nationalists fled to Taiwan, taking the ROC government with them. In 1952, Japan renounced Taiwan in the Treaty of San Francisco without specifying to whom Taiwan is ceded.

In 2016, A. P. Winston, the author of Chinese Finance under the Republic, said, "chief sources of information on those matters of discussion which have been subjects of diplomacy" were official publications from the United Kingdom. Winston explained that only a few official reports from the Chinese government aside from the maritime customs sector had appeared at that point, and that the government of the ROC was "too poor, perhaps still too secretive, to make regular and full publication of statistics."

During the Cold War the ROC generally maintained an anti-communist stance, however during the late 1960s and early 1970s the government of Chiang Kai-shek undertook secret negotiations with Moscow. Even going so far as having the foreign minister suggest that the ROC would have their own "Warsaw talk" with the Soviets. Throughout the Cold War Wang Sheng was a driving force in diplomacy between the ROC and the anti-communist world.

After retreating there in 1949 Chiang Kai-shek never again left Taiwan, this required leaders who wanted to meet with Chiang to travel to Taiwan. The first head of state during the KMT era to make a state visit abroad was Yen Chia-kan in 1977 when he visited Saudi Arabia.

In September 2016, the Ministry of Foreign Affairs planned to disband fewer than ten of its embassies to allocate for a "New Southbound Policy".

Since 1990, the ROC has witnessed a net of 16 countries switch recognition to the PRC.

In January 2021, the European Parliament passed two Taiwan related resolutions. The first resolution contained statements of support for Taiwan's democracy. The second encouraged member states to work to "revisit their engagement policies with Taiwan" as well as to work together with international partners to "protect democratic Taiwan from foreign threats."

Number of countries recognizing ROC and PRC
Year	Recognition of ROC	Recognition of PRC
1969	71	48
1971	68	53
1973	31	89
1978	21	112
1986	23	134
1990	28	139
2012	23	172
2013	22	172
2016	21	174
2017	20	175
2018	17	178
2019	15	180
2021	14	181
2023	13	182
2024	12	183 (Note: Out of the 193 UN member states, two UN observer states, and two states in free association with New Zealand (the Cook Islands and Niue), 181 UN member states, the Cook Islands and Niue recognize the People's Republic of China as the sole legitimate government of China. The 12 states who recognize the Republic of China include 11 UN member states and the Holy See (Vatican City). Bhutan is the only sovereign state within the United Nations System which has not established diplomatic relations with either the PRC or the ROC.)

== Bilateral relations ==
=== Africa ===
Liberia recognised the ROC in 1989, and switched back to the PRC in October 2003.

==== Burkina Faso ====
Burkina Faso–Taiwan relations refer to the historical relationship between the Republic of China (Taiwan) and Burkina Faso. Taiwan had an embassy in Ouagadougou, and Burkina Faso had an embassy in Taipei. In May 2018, Burkina Faso switched to recognize the People's Republic of China, thus ending diplomatic ties with Taiwan. The last ambassador of Burkina Faso to Taiwan, appointed in August 2017, was Aminata Sana Congo.

==== Chad ====
Chad–Taiwan relations are relations between Chad and the Republic of China (ROC).

==== Eswatini ====
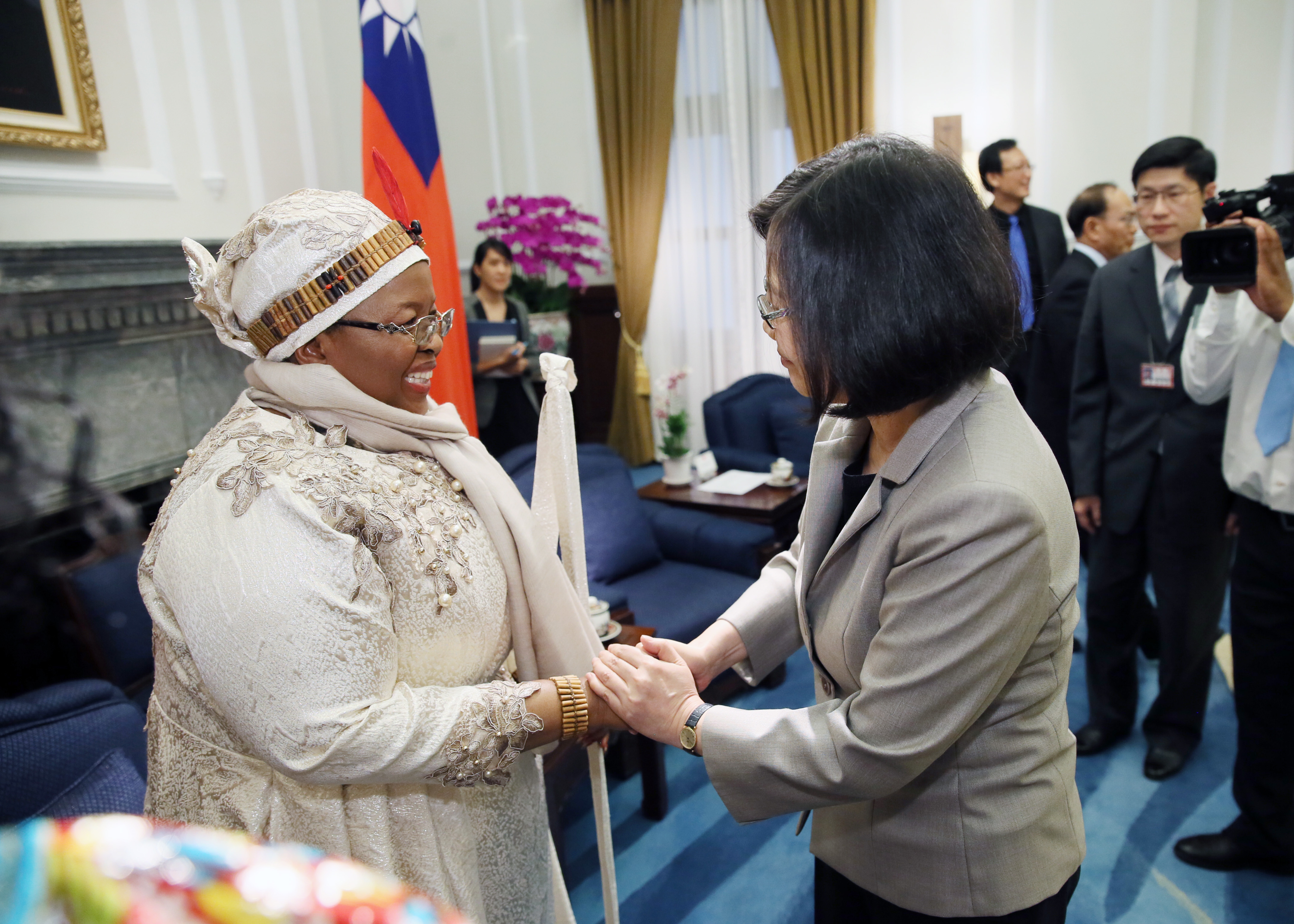
Eswatini Queen Mother Ntombi Tfwala and President Tsai Ing-wen in Taiwan

After Burkina Faso cut relations with Taiwan in 2018, Eswatini remained Taiwan's sole ally in Africa. Taiwan has an embassy in Mbabane, Eswatini. On 7 June 2016, the National Police Agency and Royal Eswatini Police Service signed a joint, cross-border, crime fighting pact, which included exchanges, probes, personnel visits, professional skills enhancement, law enforcement and technical assistance. King Mswati III has visited Taiwan seventeen times as of June 2018, and has promised to continue recognising Taiwan instead of the PRC. As of June 2018, the Taiwanese Ambassador is Thomas Chen (陳經銓).

==== Gambia ====
The Gambia recognised the ROC from 1968 until 1974, and then again from 1995 until 14 November 2013, when President Yahya Jammeh's office announced it had cut diplomatic ties with immediate effect. During this era Taiwan gave hundreds of millions of dollars in aid and loans to The Gambia, much of which was diverted by President Yahya Jammeh and those close to him. The PRC recognised The Gambia on 17 March 2016. Upon Gambian recognition the PRC immediately began to furnish them with aid. The repeated switch off between PRC and ROC recognition is seen as an example of checkbook diplomacy.

==== Libya ====
Libya–Taiwan relations refers to bilateral relations between Taiwan and Libya. Relations began in 1959 and continued on and off until the First Libyan Civil War.

==== Malawi ====
Malawi–Taiwan relations refer to foreign relations between Malawi and Taiwan. Diplomatic relations existed from 1966 to 2008. There are no current official diplomatic relations between the two countries.

==== São Tomé and Príncipe ====
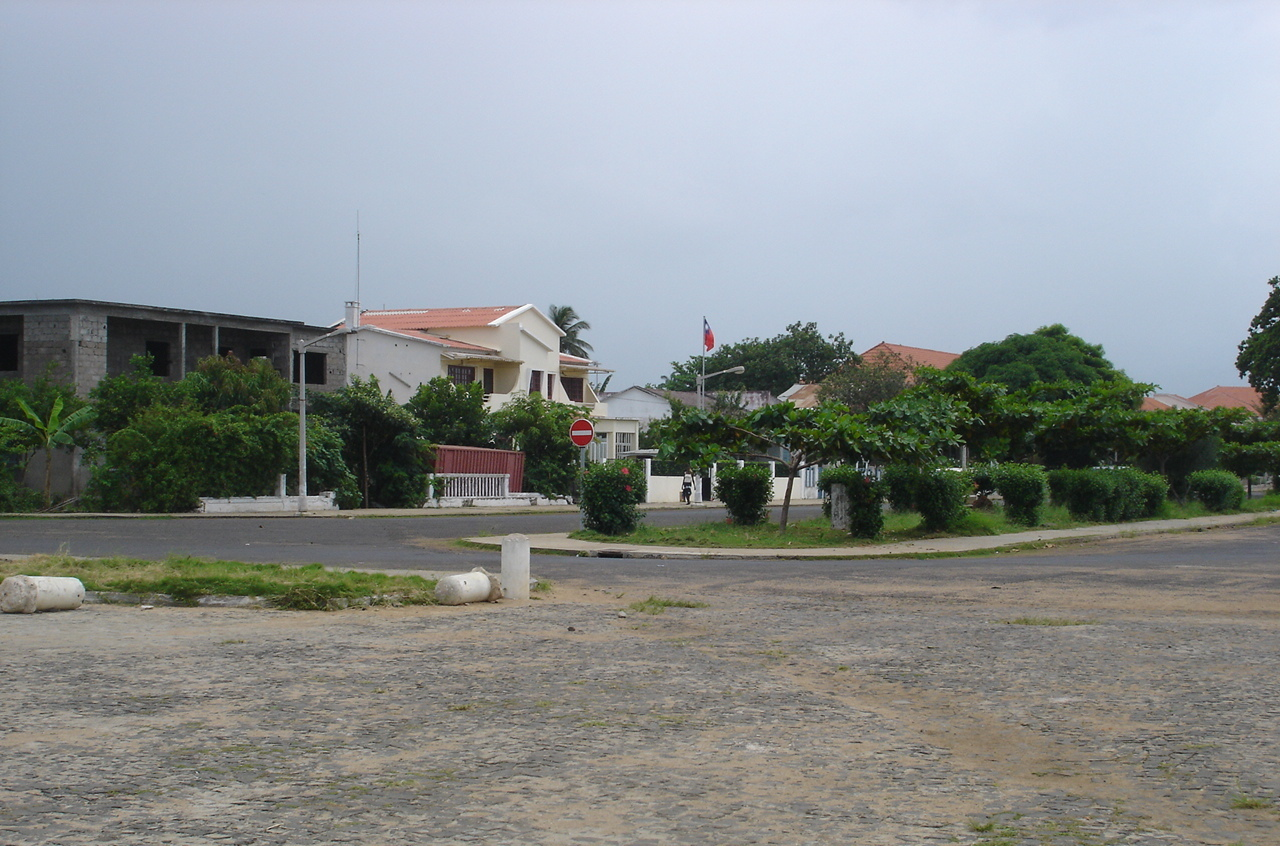
The Embassy of the Republic of China in São Tomé and Príncipe in 2007

São Tomé and Príncipe–Taiwan relations are relations between São Tomé and Príncipe and Taiwan (officially the Republic of China or ROC). Official bilateral relations began in 1997 and ended in 2016 after São Tomé and Principe requested monetary aid, around US$200 million, and Taiwan rejected it; this move is thought to have been influenced by China.

==== South Africa ====
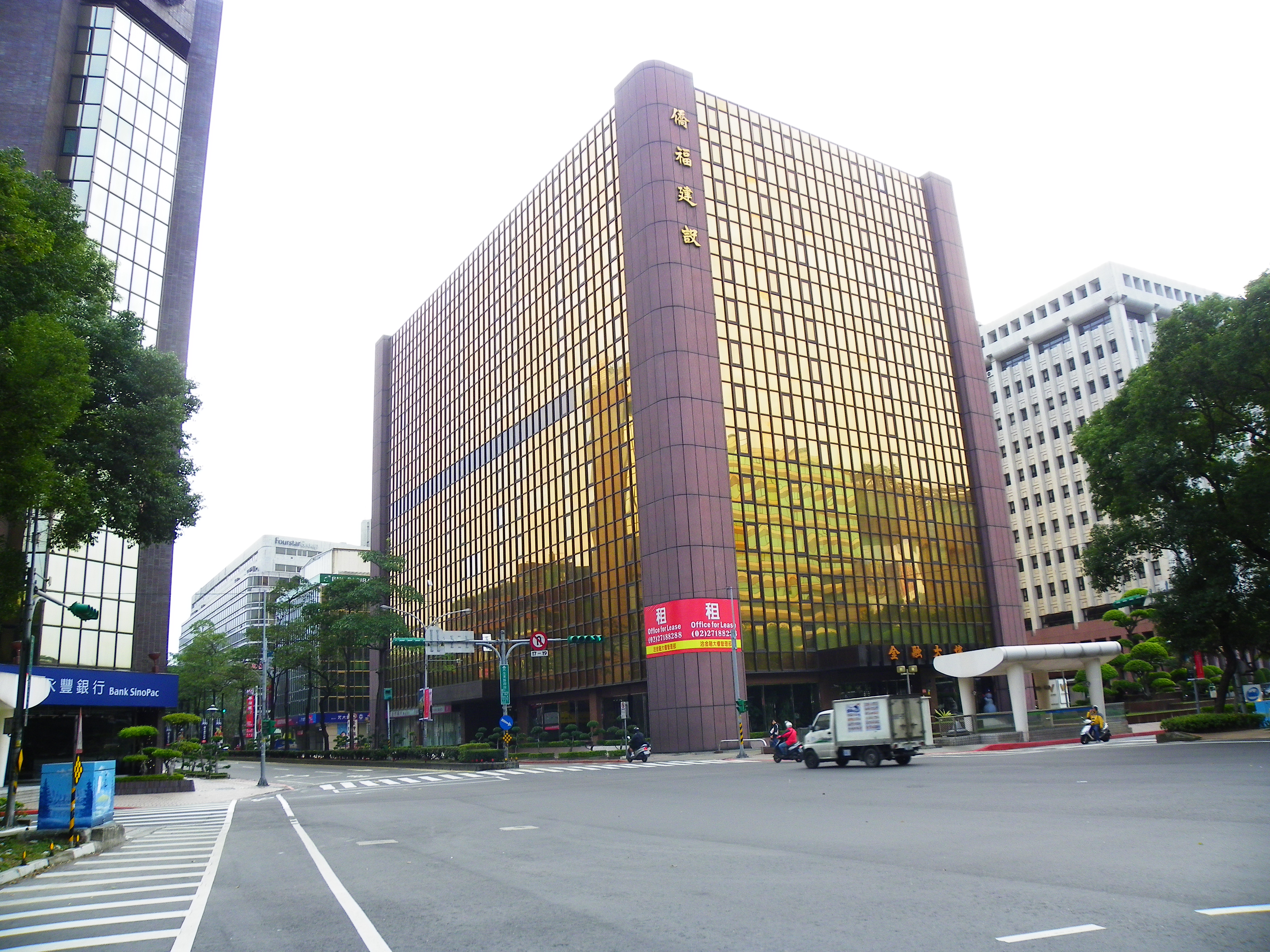
Chaofu Finance Building, where the Liaison Office of the Republic of South Africa is located, in Taipei, Taiwan.

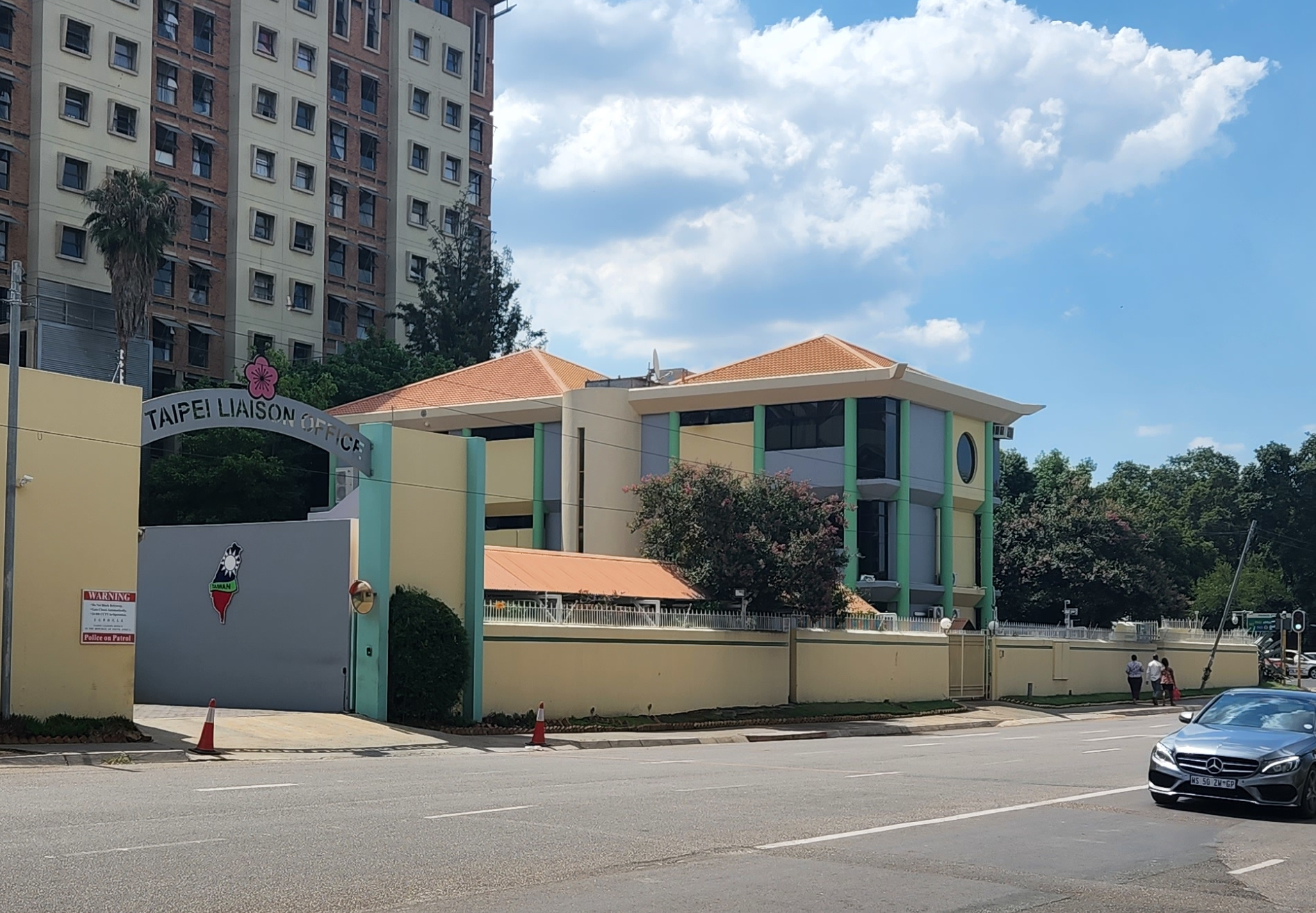
The Taipei Liaison Office in Pretoria, South Africa.

South Africa–Taiwan relations (before 1998, Republic of China–South Africa relations) refers to the current and historical relationship between the Republic of China (Taiwan) and the Republic of South Africa. The Republic of China and South Africa established diplomatic ties in 1949.

Relations between the two countries were strong during the apartheid-era in South Africa, but officially ended in January 1998, when South African President Nelson Mandela recognized the People's Republic of China, pursuant to the one China principle, and Taiwan as a part of China. Despite the ending of diplomatic relations, ROC and South Africa continue to maintain trade relations. South Africa was the last major power and G20 nation to have relations with the ROC.

In the absence of formal diplomatic relations, the two countries now have "Liaison Offices", which serve as de facto embassies. South Africa is now represented in Taipei by the Liaison Office of the Republic of South Africa. Similarly, Taiwan is represented by the Taipei Liaison Office in the Republic of South Africa in Pretoria. There is also a Taipei Liaison Office in Cape Town.

Diplomatic relations between South Africa and Taiwan have soured in recent years, with South Africa demanding that Taiwan relocate its Pretoria (administrative capital) Liaison Office to Johannesburg (not a capital city), and downgrade it to a simple trade office. In kind, Taiwan has placed semiconductor export restrictions on South Africa, citing national security concerns over South Africa's close allegiance with China.

==== Somaliland ====
Somaliland–Taiwan relations refers to the relationship between the Republic of Somaliland and the Republic of China (Taiwan). The ROC was one of the 35 countries to recognize the original independence of the short lived State of Somaliland in 1960.

The two countries in 2020 established embassy-like representative offices in each other's capital city. Somaliland claims that Republic of China (Taiwan) recognises their independence. The Republic of China (Taiwan) for its part officially refers to Somaliland as a country, but has not released a formal declaration of recognition of Somaliland's independence.

=== Asia ===
==== Bangladesh ====
Bangladesh has had limited bilateral exchanges with the ROC since it declared independence in 1971. Bangladesh is the ROC's second largest South Asian trading partner in spite of a global slump. Bangladesh mainly exports garments, knitwear, jutes, leathers and handicrafts to the ROC and imports an assortment of textiles, machines, electronics, steels, and plastic.

==== China ====
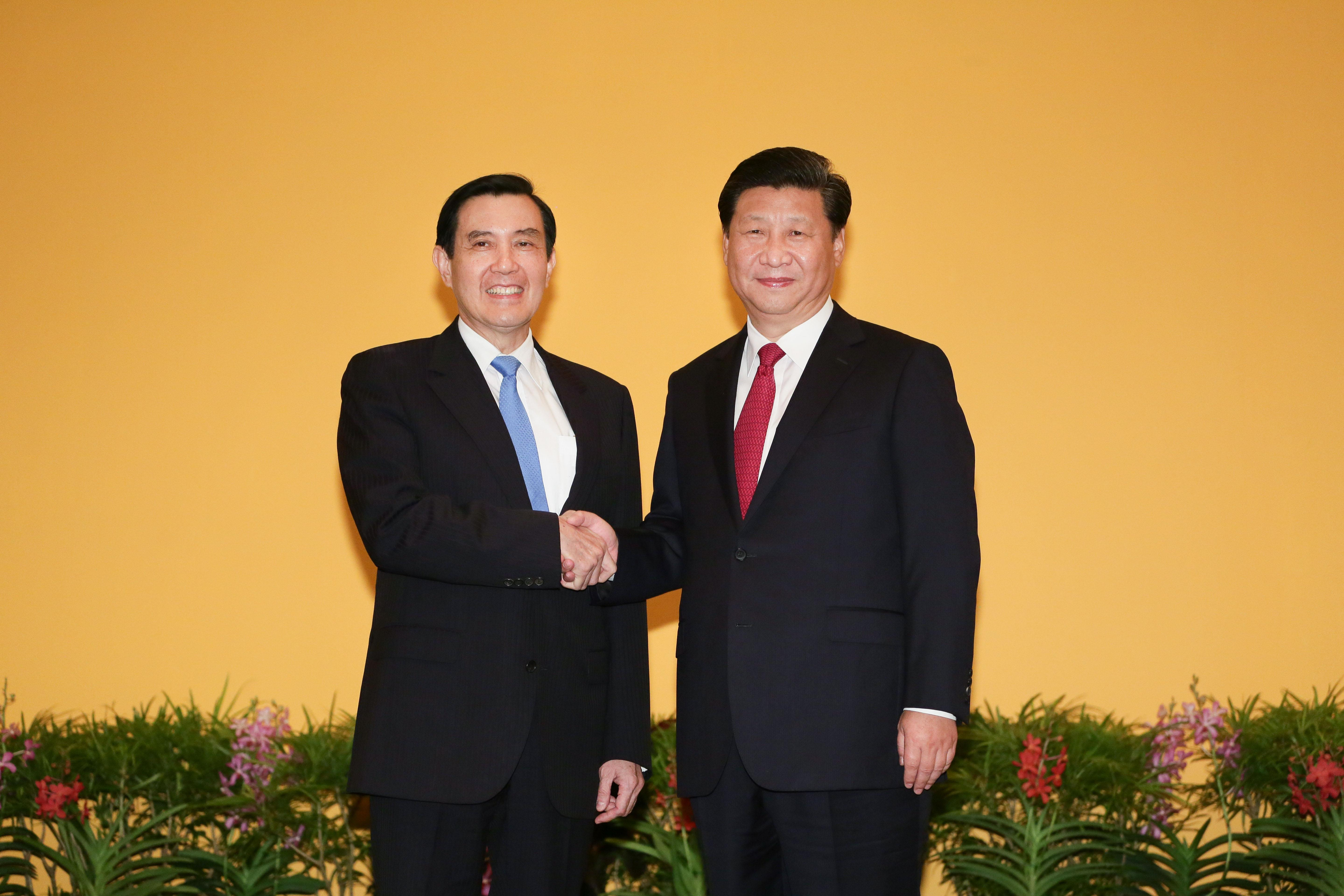
Ma–Xi meeting in 2015

The Double Tenth Agreement signed on 10 October 1945 is the only legal document between the two parties. The following Political Consultative Conference (Republic of China), was engulfed by Cold War history and the American foreign policy of containment in East Asia after the Korean War. Before the Korean War broke out, the US was preparing for a coup d'état in mid-1950 to replace Chiang Kai-shek with Hu Shih and Sun Li-jen and neutralize the ROC's legal status under UN Trusteeship to block any legal claim of the PRC on Taiwan, as proposed by United States Department of State official Dean Rusk. The Formosa Resolution of 1955 was passed unanimously by the United States Congress. Resolving the cross-strait relationship required both sides to rethink definitions of basic concepts such as sovereignty, "one China" and unification.

The two polities of accession resulted in the PRC's Campaign to Suppress Counterrevolutionaries, the lifting of its martial law on PRC territory, and more recently the enactment of the PRC's Anti-Secession Law towards the ROC. The two sides have no cross-strait military confidence-building measures (CBM) "to improve military-to-military relations in ways that reduce fears of attack and the potential for military miscalculation". Nuclear tensions have risen since the PRC promulgated the Anti-Secession Law.

The government position that both Taiwan and mainland China are parts of the same state is not universally accepted among the people of Taiwan. In particular, the pro-independence Pan-Green Coalition considers Taiwan and China to be different countries. By contrast, the pro-unification Pan-Blue Coalition take the view that both Taiwan and mainland China are parts of the ROC. Former president Lee Tung-hui described these relations as "Special state-to-state relations". The Chen administrations described Taiwan and China by saying "...with Taiwan and China on each side of the Taiwan Strait, each side is a country.". Former President Ma Ying-jeou returned to the government position of the early 1990s, calling relations with Beijing special relations between two areas within one state. That state, according to Taiwan is the ROC, and due to constitutional reasons, neither Taipei nor Beijing recognises each other as a legitimate government.

The term preferred by Taiwanese and Chinese governments is "cross-strait relations", referring to the geographical separator, the Taiwan Strait. The constitutional position of Taipei is that the territory of the ROC is divided into the "Mainland Area" and the "Free Area" (also known as "Taiwan Area"). Administratively, cross-strait relations are not conducted by the Ministry of Foreign Affairs of Taiwan, but by the Mainland Affairs Council, an instrument of the Executive Yuan. The relations with Hong Kong and Macau are also conducted by the Mainland Affairs Council, although not all regulations applicable to mainland China automatically apply to those territories.

Taiwanese and Chinese governments do not directly interact. Talks are conducted by China's Association for Relations Across the Taiwan Straits (ARATS) and Taiwan's Straits Exchange Foundation (SEF), privately constituted bodies that are controlled and directly answerable to the executive branches of their respective governments.

Until the late 1990s, Hong Kong and Macau were British and Portuguese colonies respectively. They provided neutral detour points for people and goods crossing the strait. They and Singapore served as venues for talks between the two sides at that time. One modus vivendi outcome of such talks was the 1992 Consensus, arising from a 1992 meeting in Hong Kong. Under this consensus, the two sides agree that both Taiwan and mainland China are under the same single sovereignty of China, but the two sides agree to disagree on which side is the legitimate representative of that sovereignty. Setting aside that disagreement, the two sides agreed to co-operate on practical matters, such as recognising certifications authenticated by the other side.

Relations between Taipei and Beijing warmed during the Ma government with the promotion of cross-strait links and increased economic and social interchanges between the two sides, but the 2014 local elections cooled them again. A high-level meeting was held on 11 February 2014 in Nanjing that marked the first time China recognised Taiwan's top government officials on matters across the Taiwan Strait. The thawed tensions were not welcomed by the Pan-Green Coalition for the Taiwan independence movement after the 2000 presidential election and to the ex injuria jus non oritur basis of the Anti-Secession Law. A meeting was held on 7 November 2015 between presidents Xi and Ma to affirm the 1992 Consensus before the ROC 2016 general election and in the midst of US Navy tests of area sea claims. Following the election, Beijing cut off contact with the main Taiwan liaison body because of President Tsai Ing-wen's refusal to endorse the concept of a single Chinese nation.

===== Hong Kong =====
Relations between the government of Hong Kong SAR of the People's Republic of China (PRC) and the Taiwan Area of the Republic of China (ROC) encompass both when Hong Kong was under British rule or when the Republic of China controlled mainland China and afterwards the ROC fled to Taiwan. This is also a part of the Cross-strait relations.

===== Macau =====
Macau–Taiwan relations is part of cross-strait relations and is under the jurisdiction of the Mainland Affairs Council of the Republic of China, and the Macau Office of the Mainland Affairs Council operates in Macau in the name of the Taipei Economic and Trade Representative Office to handle bilateral affairs between the Macau Special Administrative Region and the Taiwan region. In contrast, the Macau SAR Government set up the Macau Economic and Cultural Office in Taipei, the seat of the Taiwan authorities, which was suspended on 19 June 2021 due to poor cross-strait relations.

The offices of the Taiwan authorities in the Hong Kong Special Administrative Region and the Macao Special Administrative Region are the only two administrative organs in the mainland, Hong Kong, and Macau regions.

==== India ====
Leadership meetings between ROC and India were carried out in the early 1940s before Indian independence from Great Britain. The ROC is included in India's Look East policy. Bilateral relations between India and the ROC improved starting from the 1990s, despite the absence of official diplomatic relations. India recognises only the PRC. However, economic and commercial links as well as people-to-people contacts have expanded. Like the PRC, the ROC disputes the Chinese border with India over Arunachal Pradesh. The ROC Constitution declares this area a part of South Tibet, and disputes the validity of the McMahon Line.

==== Iran ====
On 1 June 1920, a friendship agreement was signed between the ROC and Iran. Ratifications were exchanged on 6 February 1922, with effect on the same day. These relations came to an end in 1971 as Iran recognised Beijing. The two countries have an unofficial relationship in commerce and Taiwan imports a significant amount of its oil from Iran. An Iranian newspaper wrote on its front-page in December 2022 that Taiwan has a "legal right" to independence.

==== Israel ====
Due to the One China policy, Israel and Taiwan do not have formal diplomatic relations but each has a representative office in the other country and in practice the two countries have friendly relations. There is considerable contact in the areas of science and technology, including military technology.

As relations between Israel and the PRC have worsened due to the Gaza war, ties between Israel and Taiwan continue to warm and are driven by assertions that the two are both isolated democracies. Members of the Legislative Yuan set up the Taiwan-Israel Congressional Association on 23 February 2024 to promote people-to-people exchanges; cooperation in agriculture, technology and education; and bilateral visits.

==== Japan ====
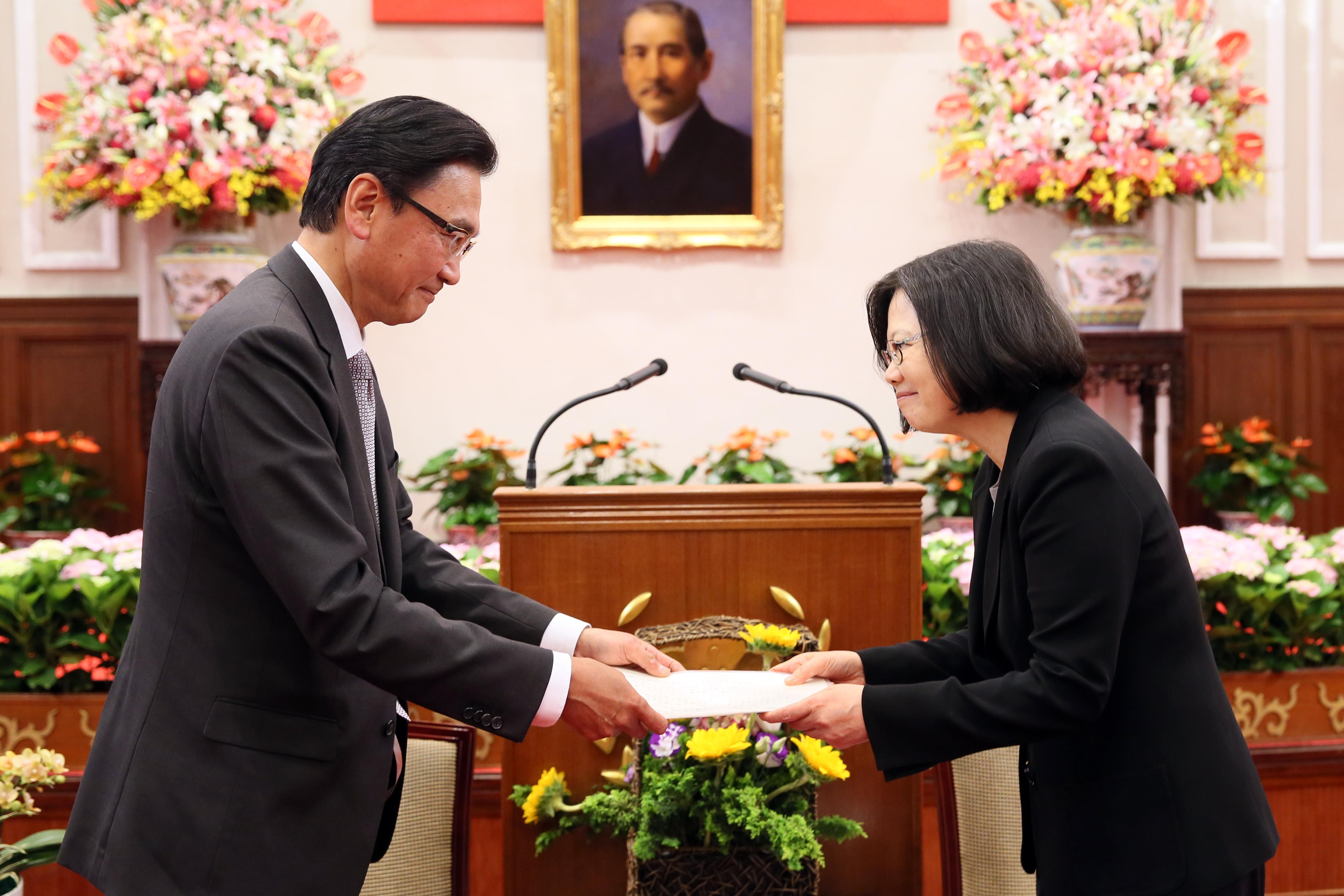
Member of the House of Representative of Japan Keiji Furuya and President Tsai Ing-wen in Taiwan on 20 May 2016

Japan–Taiwan relations are guided by the 1972 Japan–China Joint Communiqué. Japan has maintained non-governmental, working-level relations with Taiwan ever since.

==== Malaysia ====
Malaysia operates a trade centre office in Taipei, and the ROC has an economic and cultural office in Kuala Lumpur.

==== Mongolia ====
Until 1945, Nationalist China claimed sovereignty over Mongolia, but under Soviet pressure and as part of the Sino-Soviet Treaty of Friendship and Alliance of August 1945, it recognised Mongolian independence. In 1953, due to the deterioration of diplomatic relations with the Soviet Union, it revoked this recognition and resumed considering it a part of China.

On 3 October 2002, the Ministry of Foreign Affairs recognised Mongolia as an independent country, although no legislative actions were taken to address concerns over its constitutional claims to Mongolia. A Taipei Economic and Cultural Representative Office was opened in Ulaanbaatar, and Taipei excluded Mongolia from the definition of the "mainland area" for administrative purposes. In 2006, old laws regulating the formation of banners and monasteries in Outer Mongolia were repealed. Offices established to support Taipei's claims over Outer Mongolia, such as the Mongolian and Tibetan Affairs Commission, are dormant. However, the official borders of the ROC have not been changed. The official status of recognition is currently ambiguous, though in practice Mongolia is treated as an ordinary foreign power.

==== Myanmar ====
Myanmar–Taiwan relations refers to the international relations between Myanmar and the Republic of China. There are no official relations between the two countries, as Myanmar only recognizes the People's Republic of China (PRC) and considers Taiwan to be an integral part of the PRC.

==== North Korea ====
On April 13, 1919; the Republic of China recognized the Provisional Government of the Republic of Korea. The Nationalist government of China participated in the Cairo Conference which resulted in the Cairo Declaration with the aim of freeing Korea and Taiwan from Japanese colonial rule.

After the communist takeover of China in 1949 and the establishment of the Democratic People's Republic of Korea in 1948, formal relations between the two are non-existent, however, unofficial relations are significant. North Korea adheres to the one-China principle and considers Taiwan to be an inalienable part of the People's Republic of China.

==== Pakistan ====
Pakistan–Taiwan relations mainly involves commerce and trade. The relationship between Pakistan and Taiwan is primarily characterized by economic importance rather than political significance, given Pakistan's close alliance with the People's Republic of China. The Pakistani government adheres to a "One-China" policy.

==== Philippines ====
The Philippines recognises the One China Policy, but has relations with the ROC through the Manila Economic and Cultural Office in Taipei and the Taipei Economic and Cultural Office in Manila. Both offices were established in 1975 and were organized as non-profit corporations. The Philippines is the focal country for the ROC's 2016–2020 Southbound Policy, where the ROC plans to push for greater ties. The push was initially welcomed by the Aquino Administration, however, the Duterte Administration was elected in May 2016, complicating the issue as President Duterte was seen as 'pro-China', and thus would prefer better ties with the mainland over Taiwan. Political analysts during a forum in Manila said that ties between the Philippines and the ROC would have been the best coalition in the Far East, if the South China Sea territorial disputes between the two nations did not exist. The Philippines supports the ROC's membership in UNESCO.

==== Saudi Arabia ====
Saudi Arabia and the Republic of China (Taiwan) have had a long relationship with diplomatic, military, and commercial elements. Relations formally existed until 1990 after which Saudi Arabia recognized the People's Republic of China (PRC).

==== Singapore ====
Singapore maintained unofficial relations with both the ROC and the PRC until 1992. It was decided in the Second Ministerial Meeting of APEC as chaired by Singapore in 1990 for the inclusion of the ROC commencing with the Third Ministerial Meeting in Seoul. After the establishment of diplomatic ties between Singapore and PRC on 3 October 1992, Singapore maintained close economic and military ties with Taiwan as part of its attempt to position itself as a neutral party. A diplomatic row broke out between China and Singapore when Lee Hsien Loong visited Taiwan one month before he was sworn in as the Prime Minister of Singapore. Singapore's Ministry of Defence moved to correct an erroneous report in the Liberty Times on a joint military exercise between the Singapore and Taiwan in March 2005. Singapore is the only foreign country to maintain military training camps in Taiwan, and continues to regularly send infantry, artillery, and armoured personnel there for training. The PRC has offered to support relocating some or all of these facilities to Hainan. On the issue of United Nations participation for Taiwan, George Yeo and Mark Chen, the two countries' Foreign Ministers at the time, engaged in a heated exchange of views in 2004 between Beijing's insistence that FTA can only be concluded among sovereign states complicates matters for Taiwan. Accordingly, Singapore and Taiwan signed the "Agreement between Singapore and the Separate Customs Territory of Taiwan, Penghu, Kinmen and Matsu on Economic Partnership (ASTEP)" in November 2013.

==== South Korea ====
The ROC recognised the establishment of the First Republic of Korea in 1948.

On 4 January 1949, the ROC set up an embassy in Myeongdong in Seoul. On 23 August 1992 the ROK severed diplomatic relations with the ROC and then established diplomatic relations with the PRC as part of its Nordpolitik, the last Asian country to switch. In 1991 in the last months of the Cold War, Beijing and Seoul have established ROK and PRC liaisons prior to this and later turned embassies.

==== Thailand ====
Taiwan (formally the Republic of China) and Thailand (formally the Kingdom of Thailand) used to have diplomatic relations from 1946 until 1 July 1975 when Thailand recognized and established diplomatic relations with the People's Republic of China. Despite the shift in recognition, Thailand maintains informal relations with Taiwan.

==== Turkey ====
Taiwan–Turkey relations are the foreign relations between Taiwan and Turkey. Since 1971, Turkey maintains non-governmental, working-level relations with Taiwan.

==== United Arab Emirates ====
Taiwan–United Arab Emirates relations
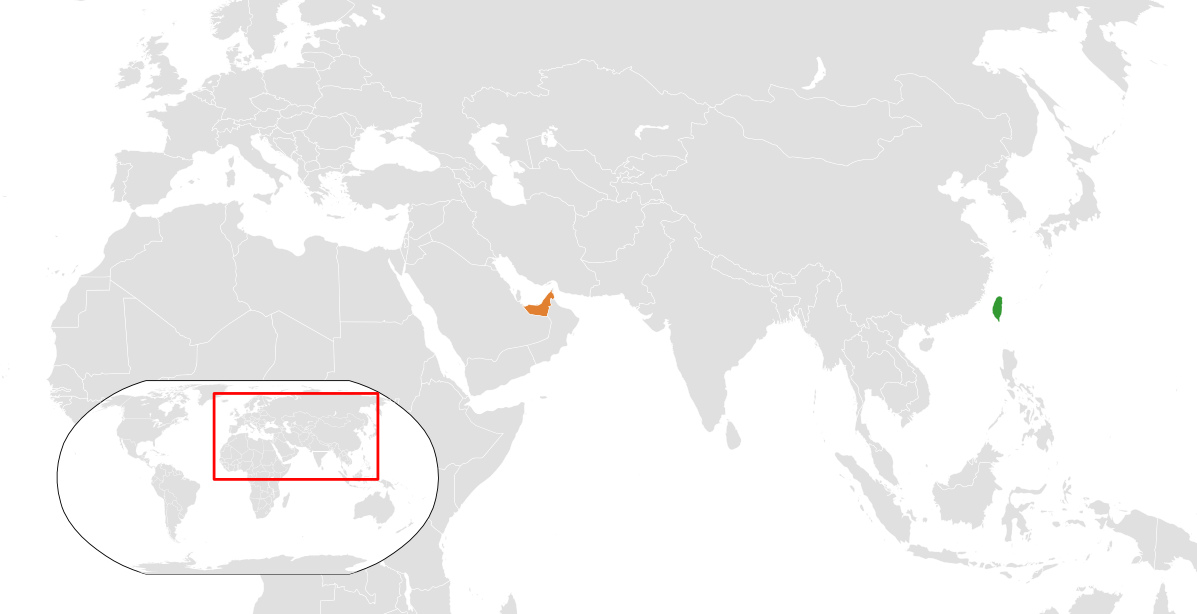

- Taiwan: United Arab Emirates

Taiwan–United Arab Emirates relations are relations between the United Arab Emirates (UAE) and Taiwan (formally known as the Republic of China)

==== Vietnam ====
Taiwan–Vietnam relations are conducted on an unofficial level, as Hanoi adheres to a one-China policy and officially recognises the PRC only. However, this has not stopped bilateral visits and significant flows of migrants and investment capital between the ROC and Vietnam. The ROC is an important foreign direct investment partner to Vietnam.

Other than the PRC itself, Vietnam is the only communist country that maintains an unofficial relationship with the ROC.

=== Europe ===
==== Belgium ====
In 2020, Belgium's Chamber of Representatives passed a resolution of support for Taiwan. In 2021, the Flemish Parliament did the same passing a resolution in support of Taiwan with 117 votes in favor, no votes in opposition, and four abstentions. Flemish wind power companies Jan De Nul and DEME are involved in offshore wind farm development in Taiwan.

==== Czechia ====
Relations between Czechia and Taiwan are significant. Jaroslav Kubera, President of the Senate of the Czech Republic, planned a visit to Taipei prior to his death, prompting threats of retaliation from China's Ministry of Foreign Affairs. Kubera's successor, Miloš Vystrčil, however, led a delegation to Taiwan that arrived in Taipei on August 31, 2020.

==== Denmark ====
On 9 January 1950, Denmark became one of the first European countries to recognize the PRC. While Denmark has continued to maintain unofficial relations with the ROC ever since, they have primarily been related to trade, culture, science and economic affairs.

==== Estonia ====
Estonia and Taiwan maintain informal relations, with cultural and economic exchanges despite lacking formal diplomatic ties. Taiwan is represented in Estonia through the Taipei Mission in Latvia. In recent years, Estonia has shown increasing support for Taiwan, notably through reciprocal diplomatic delegations and openness towards a possible Taiwanese representative office in Tallinn. Both nations have cooperated in areas like trade and crisis management, with notable contributions such as Taiwan's donations to Estonia during the COVID-19 pandemic and the Ukrainian refugee crisis.

==== Finland ====
Finland–Taiwan relations are informal and largely economic, because the two countries do not have official diplomatic ties. On 13 January 1950, Finland acknowledged the People's Republic of China government in Beijing as the legitimate government of China, and diplomatic relations were established in October the same year. When referring to the country, the government of Finland tends to use the designation Taiwan instead of the official Republic of China.

A Taiwanese representative office was opened in Helsinki in 1990 and a corresponding Finnish office in Taipei a year later. These offices function as de facto embassies, as the countries have no formal diplomatic relations.

The Taipei Representative Office in Finland keeps relations with Finnish parliamentarians from various political parties. In May 2020, Taiwan donated 200,000 surgical masks to the Northern Finnish healthcare district, and they were received by Mikko Kärnä, who was the chair of the informal Taiwan friendship club of the Finnish parliament.

In 2005, under the term of Taipei representative in Finland Janet Chang, the Arrangement on Air Services between Taiwan and Finland was signed, indicating the potential for direct flights to operate between Taiwan and Finland in the future. Finland has also engaged in the Global Cooperation and Training Framework (GCTF) in Taiwan, which was initially initiated by Taiwan and the United States in 2015. Specifically, in 2024, the Finland Trade Centre in Taiwan co-hosted a GCTF event focused on strengthening civilian training to address resilience and emergency response in the face of climate change and other global challenges.

In 2025 heavy metal musician and politician Freddy Lim was appointed as the Taiwanese representative in Finland.

==== France ====
French and Chinese forces engaged in battles around Taiwan in the late 19th century. In the early 20th century, the French Third Republic established diplomatic relations with the Republic of China (ROC). In 1964, France became the first major Western power to establish ambassadorial level diplomatic relations with the People's Republic of China (PRC) instead but continued to sell major weapon platforms to the ROC following its retreat to Taiwan. This was stepped back in 1994 when France upgraded its relations with the PRC and recognized Taiwan as Chinese territory. Relations have improved significantly since then. Military relations have been impacted by scandals like the Taiwan frigate scandal and Taiwan Mirage affair.

==== Germany ====
In January 2021 the German government appealed to the Taiwanese government to help persuade Taiwanese semiconductor companies to ramp up production as a global semiconductor shortage was hampering the German economy's recovery from the COVID-19 pandemic. A lack of semiconductors had caused vehicle production lines to be idled leading German Economy Minister Peter Altmaier to personally reach out to Taiwan's economics affairs minister Wang Mei-hua in an attempt to get Taiwanese semiconductor companies to increase their manufacturing capacity.

==== Holy See (Vatican City) ====
Diplomatic relations between the Holy See (Vatican City) and the Republic of China were established on 23 October 1942 and, with the presentation by Archbishop Antonio Riberi of his letter of credence to the President in 1946, the Holy See's Apostolic Delegation in China gained diplomatic status.

The Holy See attempted to switch recognition to the CCP/PRC after the end of the civil war but were rebuffed and so ended up recognizing the KMT/ROC on Taiwan. The Holy See and the Republic of China have recognized each other ever since. The Holy See maintains negotiations with the PRC for recognition; however, the Holy See has given the ROC assurances that any negotiations with the PRC will not come at the expense of their relations with the ROC.

==== Italy ====
Until 1970, Taiwan, as the Republic of China, was represented by an embassy in Rome and a consulate-general in Milan. This was separate from the Embassy of the Republic of China to the Holy See, which, while located in Italian territory, remains accredited to Vatican City. This led to confusion in 1989 following the Tiananmen Square protests in Beijing, when Italians protested outside the embassy, believing it to be that of the People's Republic of China.

In 2014, Taiwan decided not to participate in Expo 2015 in Milan after the Government of Italy proposed that it be represented as a corporate entity rather than as a country.

In 2020, Taiwan donated equipment and supplies to Italy as part of its medical diplomacy in response to the COVID-19 pandemic. Equipment donated included 15 respirators donated to WHO hospitals in the hard-hit Lombardy region in April 2020.

==== Kosovo ====
Kosovo–Taiwan relations are foreign relations between the Republic of Kosovo and the Republic of China. Kosovo declared its independence on 17 February 2008. Taiwan officially recognized Kosovo in February 2008 but Kosovo did not reciprocate recognition. The Taipei Representative Office in Hungary represents the interests of Taiwan in Kosovo in the absence of formal diplomatic relations.

==== Latvia ====
Today bilateral relations between Latvia and Taiwan are positive, with established economic ties, a visa-free travel regime in place between the two nations and the support of some Latvian parliamentarians towards the participation of the ROC in organizations such as the World Health Organization.

==== Lithuania ====
In November 2021, Taiwan opened its representative office in Vilnius under the name of "Taiwanese" (the first under this name in the world), with the Lithuanian office in Taipei to open in Spring 2022. Subsequently, China has imposed numerous unofficial economic sanctions on Lithuania, recalled its ambassador in Vilnius, Shen Zhifei, and demanded Lithuania recall its ambassador in Beijing, Diana Mickevičienė.

==== Netherlands ====
Netherlands–Taiwan relations go back to the 1600s when the Dutch East India Company set up a colony on Taiwan. In the modern era they are defined by the high degree of foreign direct investment which flows between the two countries and long lasting economic partnerships between Dutch and Taiwanese firms.

In 2019 the Netherlands' House of Representatives passed a motion supporting Taiwan's participation in international organizations.

==== Norway ====
Norway–Taiwan relations refer to the bilateral relations between Norway and Taiwan.

==== Poland ====
Poland–Taiwan relations refers to the bilateral relations between the Republic of Poland and the Republic of China (Taiwan).

Under the circumstance of the One China policy, Poland, like a majority of the nations in the world, does not have official diplomatic ties with the Republic of China on Taiwan, and only recognizes the People's Republic of China as the sole representative of China, however they do not take a position or recognize Taiwan as part of that China. Nonetheless, relationships between two countries have expanded dramatically, and since Poland transformed into a market economy after 1990, Taiwan has been one of largest Asian investors to Poland.

Despite this, they have their representative offices in respective countries. Poland has a representative office in Taipei while Taiwan has a representative office in Warsaw.

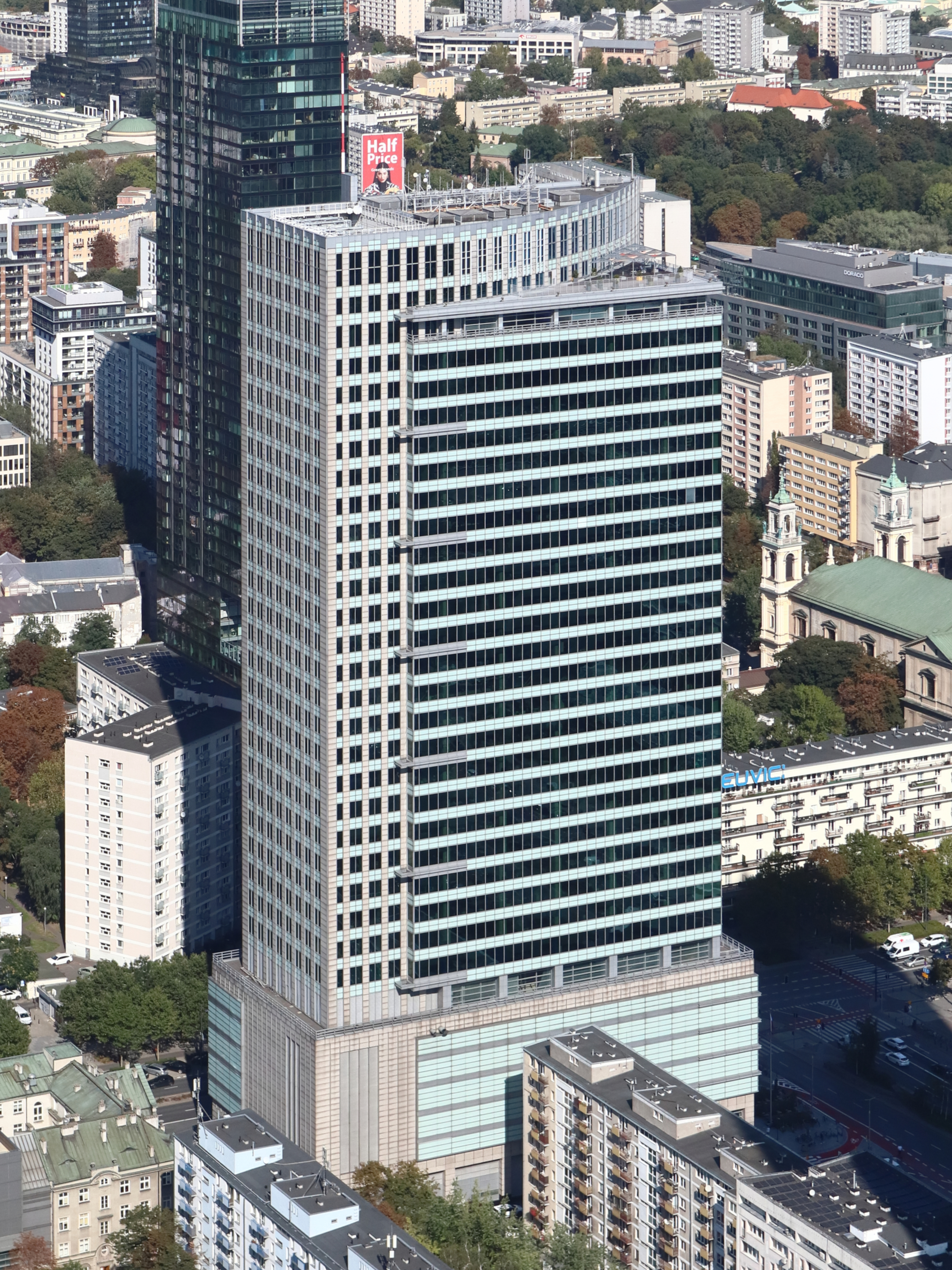
Seat of the Taipei Representative Office in Poland

==== Russia ====
In the Chinese Civil War, the Soviet Union had a tumultuous yet strategic relationship with the Kuomintang-led Nationalist China until 1949. In the Second Taiwan Strait Crisis of 1958, Soviet leader Nikita Khrushchev recommended the internationalization of the Taiwan Question and appealed to the United Nations and other multilateral organizations to intervene. The Communist Party of the Soviet Union called for the Ten Nations Summit in New Delhi to discuss the issue on 27 September 1958 as one of the precursors of the later Sino-Soviet split. Since the formation of the Russian Federation, Taiwan has exported many ferric materials to Russia in 2004–2005. In 2005, the total amount of the trade between the two economies was $2,188,944,473. Russia has a representative office in Taipei, and ROC has a representative office in Moscow. Russia keeps a positive balance in its trade relations with Taiwan mainly from crude oil, cast iron and steel, nonferrous metals, petrochemical products, ferroalloys, coking coal, timber, and chemical fertilizers. Russia imports mostly electronics and electronic parts, computers and computer parts, and home appliances. The two countries established unofficial diplomatic relations between 1993 and 1996. Taipei is targeting Russia for exporting opportunities and marketing potential.

==== Spain ====
Spain–Taiwan relations are the bilateral and diplomatic relations between these two countries. Spain has a consular section in Taipei from the Spanish Consulate General in Manila, Philippines.

==== Sweden ====
Sweden and Taiwan do not currently have formal diplomatic relations. However, they engage in unofficial exchanges and trade.

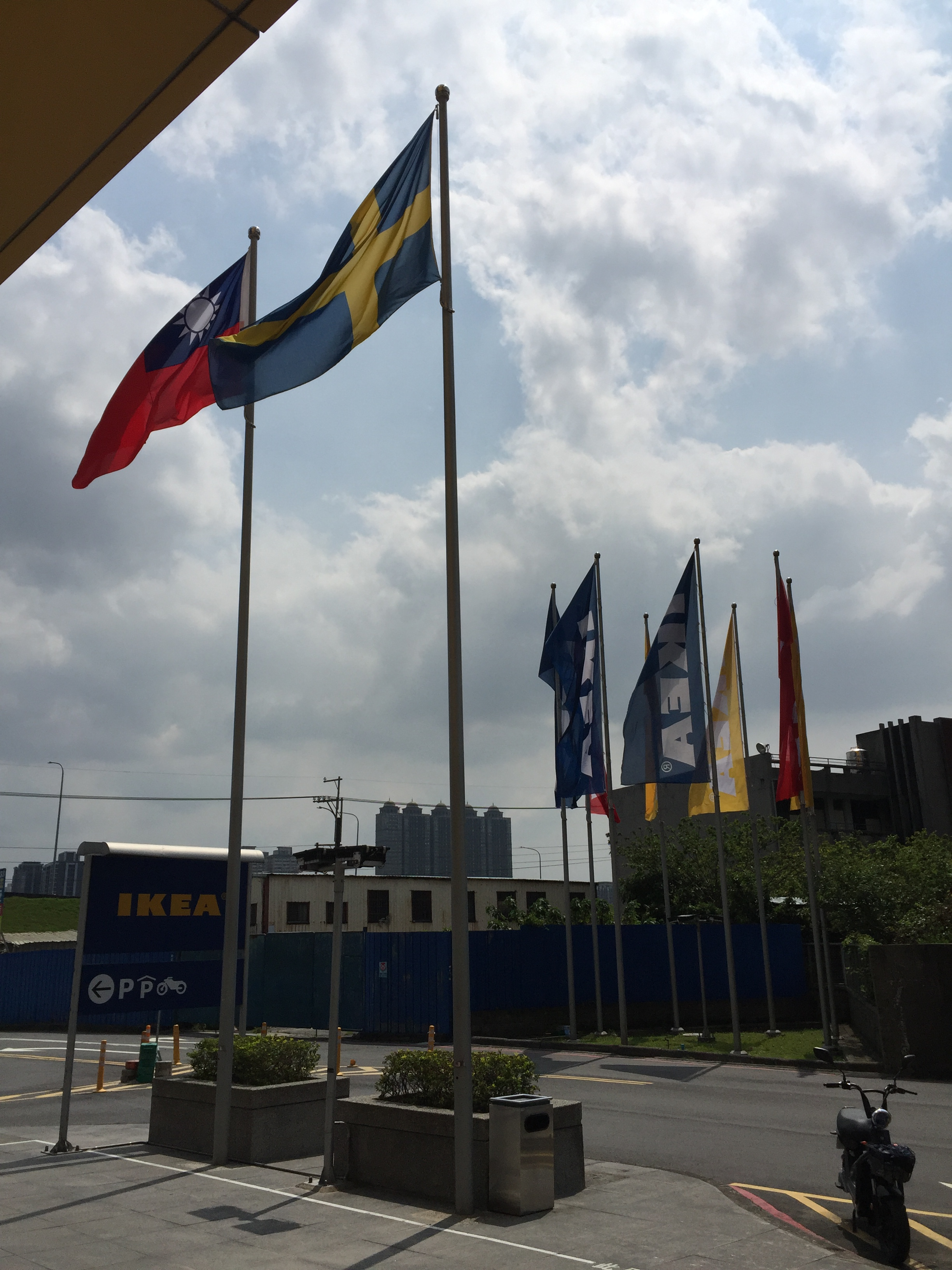
Swedish and Taiwanese Flags

==== Slovakia ====
In 2021, the Foreign Affairs Committee of the National Council of Slovakia passed a resolution to support the attendance of Taiwan to the World Health Assembly.

==== Ukraine ====
Taiwan–Ukraine relations refer to the international relations between Taiwan and Ukraine. Bilateral relations after Ukraine's independence began in 1992.

Taiwan has no representative office in Ukraine. The consulate issues were handled via the representative office located in Moscow. But this authority has been transferred to Taipei representative office in Warsaw on 26 February 2022 due to the outbreak of the Russian invasion of Ukraine.

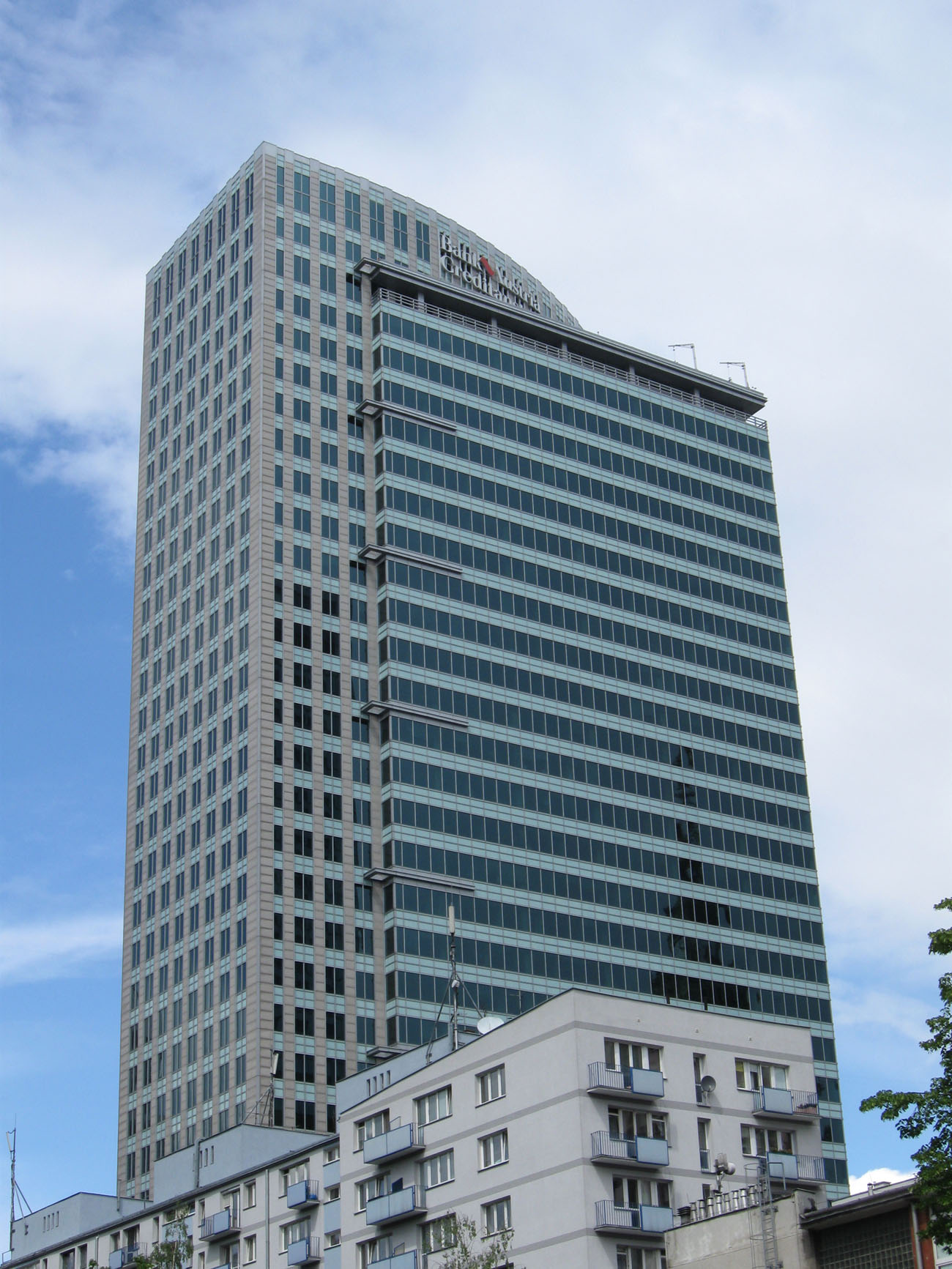
Taipei representative office in Warsaw, Poland

==== United Kingdom ====
The United Kingdom's relations with Taiwan are conducted unofficially through the British Office Taipei and the British Council in Taipei.

After the Chinese Civil War and the retreat of the KMT government to Taiwan, the United Kingdom broke off diplomatic relations with the Republic of China and recognised the People's Republic of China from 6 January 1950. In September 1962, Taiwan opened a representative office in London under the name of the Free Chinese Centre, which was later renamed the Taipei Representative Office in the U.K. from April 1992. The United Kingdom opened a representative office in Taipei in 1993 under the name of the British Trade and Cultural Office, which was later renamed the British Office Taipei in 2015.

In September 2020, Foreign, Commonwealth and Development Office ministers stated that the UK hopes Taiwan is allowed to attend the World Health Assembly as an observer.

=== North America ===
==== Belize ====
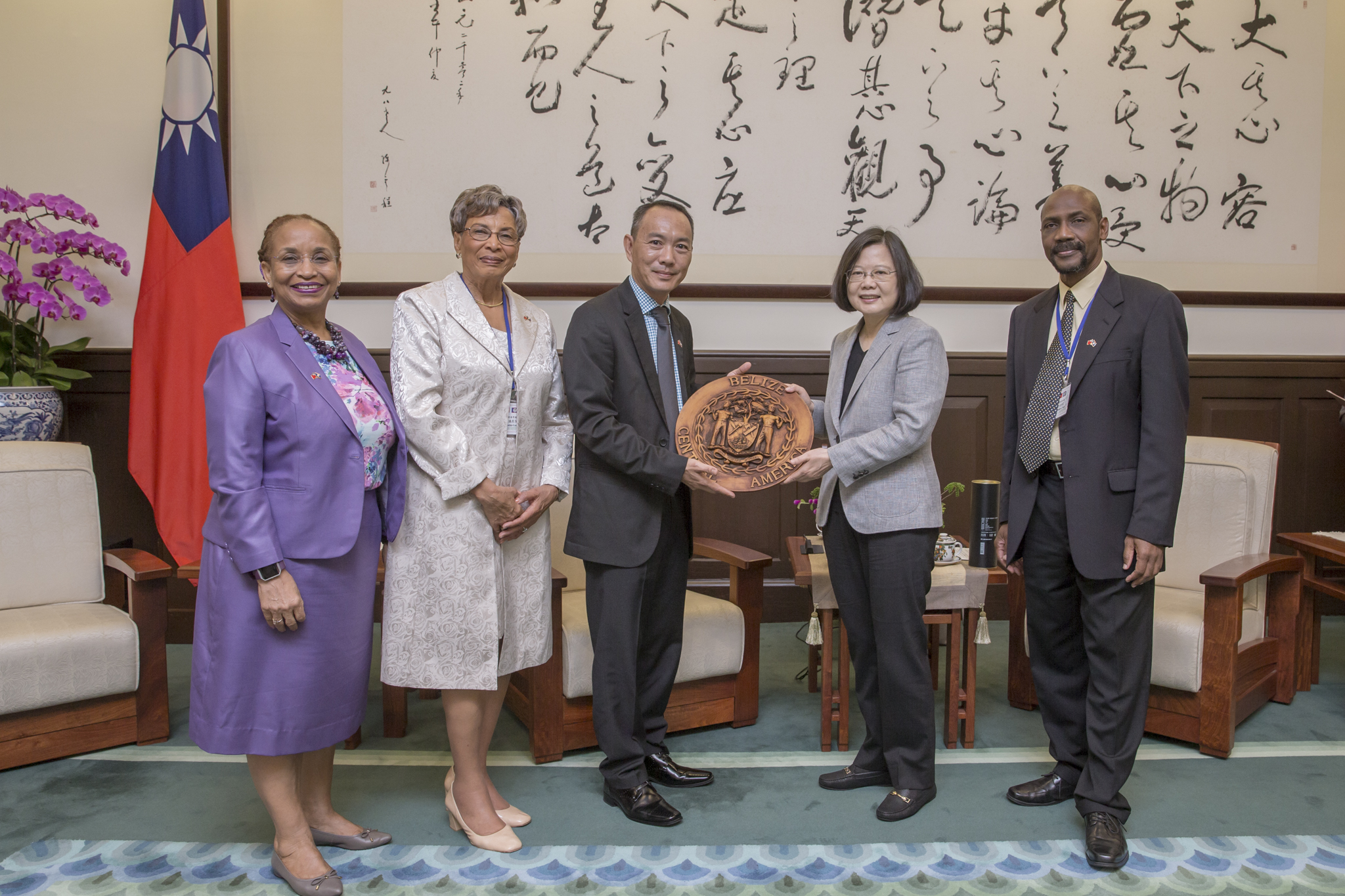
Belize Senate President Lee Mark Chang and Republic of China President Tsai Ing-wen.

Bilateral relations between Belize and Republic of China (Taiwan) have been maintained since 1989. Belize is one of the few countries that recognizes Taiwan as a country, and consequently lacks diplomatic ties with the People's Republic of China (PRC) on the mainland.

==== Dominica ====
Dominica established ties with Taiwan on 10 May 1983. In September 2001, Taiwanese Premier Chang Chun-hsiung visited Dominica to meet with Prime Minister Pierre Charles. On 23 March 2004, shortly after Prime Minister Roosevelt Skerrit took office, Dominica severed ties with Taiwan in exchange for ties with the People's Republic of China.

==== Dominican Republic ====
On 1 May 2018, the Dominican Republic switched. The government initially gave no reason, although it later said in the switchover ceremony that Taiwan was an inalienable part of China and that the switchover was to comply to the one-China policy. It was motivated by loans and investments worth US$3.1 billion. "History and socioeconomic reality" were cited as reasons for the switchover. Flavio Darío Espinal, a government executive, said that "In the following months and years, enormous opportunities for cooperation will gradually open up, not only in the commercial area, but also in the financial, technological, tourist, educational or energy fields. To take just one example, more than 135 million Chinese tourists visit international destinations annually. The establishment of these diplomatic relations will allow part of that tourism to flow into our country in the near future. And that is just one of the things that will improve."

==== El Salvador ====
On 20 August 2018, El Salvador broke ties with Taiwan and established them with the PRC. El Salvador now only recognizes the PRC. Just like Panama and the Dominican Republic, the event was broadcast nationwide on radio and television. Hours before the announcement, Taiwan (ROC) announced that it had broken ties with El Salvador, citing the imminent establishment of diplomatic and commercial ties with the PRC (China). El Salvador's president said that his government had decided to make the switchover due to UN Resolution 2758. The Taiwanese government said that the switchover was not influenced by the Chinese government, but rather, the switchover was done in response to Taiwan refusing to fund the construction of Puerto La Unión and El Salvador's 2019 Salvadoran presidential election.

==== Guatemala ====
On 18 March 2014, Guatemala's former president Alfonso Portillo pled guilty in the Federal District Court in Manhattan to a charge that he accepted bribes in exchange for recognising the ROC. President Pérez Molina said that Guatemala's relations with the ROC were and are strong and that the Portillo confession would not affect diplomatic relations between the two nations. Taiwan's Ministry of Foreign Affairs declined comment.

==== Haiti ====
Haiti currently recognises the Republic of China over the People's Republic of China. In 2018, Taiwan offered a US$150 Million loan for Haiti's power grid in a bid to maintain diplomatic ties with the country once its neighbour, Dominican Republic severed ties with Taiwan along with Burkina Faso. In 2018, Haiti's president visited Taiwan to discuss economic issues and diplomatic relations.

==== Mexico ====
Mexico and Taiwan (also known as Republic of China) have maintained unofficial bilateral relations since 1972. Previously, Mexico had formal relations with the Republic of China from 1949 until 1971, when it recognized the People's Republic of China. Both nations are members of the Asia-Pacific Economic Cooperation and the World Trade Organization.

==== Honduras ====
In 2021, it was reported the new Honduras Government elected in the 2021 Honduran general election led by the Liberty and Refoundation party was considering recognizing China. This announcement came on the heels of Costa Rica, the Dominican Republic, El Salvador, Nicaragua, and Panama having recently broken relations with the ROC; Taiwan lost a total of nine diplomatic partners during Tsai Ing-wen's presidency with the switch from Honduras. On 15 March 2023, the president Xiomara Castro said she has instructed her foreign minister to establish official relations with the PRC.

Taiwanese leadership criticized Honduras' transition by urging them not to "fall into China's debt trap". Honduras' foreign minister Eduardo Enrique Reina stated that the country had asked Taiwan to double its annual aid and renegotiate its debt to the island, which went unanswered. Taiwan's foreign ministry disputed this, stating that they were still actively engaged in bilateral talks with Honduras' government. President Tsai Ing-wen responded to the announcement by scheduling time to visit heads of government and state in nearby Belize and Guatemala. The ROC recalled its Honduran ambassador on 23 March, as Honduras began negotiations with the PRC. A 25 March statement confirmed that Honduras had completed the switch and their embassy opened in Beijing on 11 June.

==== Panama ====
On 13 June 2017, the government of Panama switched, breaking all ties with the ROC. Panamanians studying in Taiwan were given the choice of returning to Panama within 30 days or continuing their studies in China. Panama was motivated by promises of multibillion-dollar investments. The shift of recognition began with a letter sent in 2015 to the Chinese government that, according to Isabel Saint Malo, Panama's vice president, was titled "Panama wants to make ties with China". The contents of the letter have been kept confidential, as well as the reasons why it was sent. It has also been kept confidential who delivered the letter and assisted in the switchover process, a person described only as "a distinguished member of the Chinese community living in Panama".

The US ambassador to Panama, John D. Feeley, said that he had asked Panamanian President Juan Carlos Varela about the switchover in 2016 but Varela lied to him, saying that there were no plans to make the switchover. Feeley also said that Varela did not tell him the truth until one hour before the nationwide announcement.

Others questioned why the Panamanian government continues to use equipment donated by Taiwan. The Panamanian government initially gave no reason, later saying that one reason was because "China is the second largest user of the Panama Canal" and President Varela said it was because he "couldn't accept it anymore" and "that's what every responsible leader would do". The Panamanian government officially said that Taiwan was an inalienable part of China and that the switchover was to comply with the one-China policy. The ROC government said that Panama was its "number one ally" and that it would not participate in Beijing's checkbook diplomacy. The Taiwanese government complained that Panama maliciously hid the switchover process until the last moment.

A Panamanian government agency later said that the switchover was because of Taiwanese president Tsai Ing-wen's violations and lack of regard to the 1992 consensus regarding China, Taiwan and the One-china policy. Panamanian newspaper La Estrella questioned the reasons Varela initially gave for the switchover, like "China has the world's largest population and the 2nd largest economy and user of the Panama Canal"; La Estrella called Varela's actions contradictory and said that the reasons Varela gave were the reality Panama has lived under for decades, so those could not be regarded as valid reasons for the switchover. The same newspaper also says that China's plans in Latin America convince Latin American nations easily, with apparent benefits in the short term but with dependency on China in the long term and that China is silently invading other countries and Latin America in general.

In the first year of diplomatic relations, 19 treaties were signed, including a Free Trade Treaty. Varela said that its main purpose was to allow Chinese nationals to easily invest in Panama. Controversies over the sudden switchover included lack of due process, unusually high levels of confidentiality, and the fact that a few weeks before the switchover, Taiwan had donated medical equipment to Panama. In 2018, the first flight from Beijing to Panama by Air China landed at Tocumen International Airport, with a technical stop in Houston. Varela called it a milestone in Panamanian aviation. Due to this new route, the Panamanian ministry of tourism expected at least 40,000 Chinese tourist visits per year. "History and socioeconomic reality" were later cited as reasons for the switchover. Varela said that the move was backed by diplomatic relationships dating from 1912 and that the move strengthened the existing relationships, despite the fact that those relationships were with the ROC, not the PRC. As a result, Panama City was almost immediately added to China's list of officially approved tourist destinations. The CCP government has offered the Panameñista Party-led government a free feasibility study for the planned 4th set of locks in the Panama Canal to gain a competitive advantage in bids for choosing the company to build the 4th set of locks, not to mention plans for a 1,200 hectare industrial park on the Pacific coast and a 4-hectare campus in Amador near the Biomuseo to house the PRC embassy in Panama. There are also fears that Panama could turn into a conflict zone between the US and the PRC, due to Panama's strategic location.

==== St. Kitts and Nevis ====
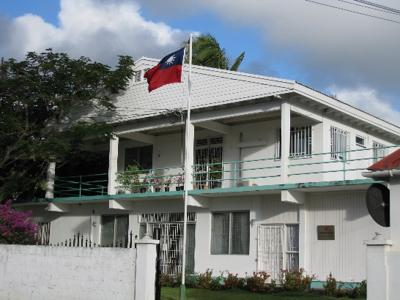
Embassy of Taiwan, Basseterre

Saint Kitts and Nevis–Taiwan relations refer to bilateral relations between St. Kitts and Nevis and the Republic of China (Taiwan).

==== St. Lucia ====
Saint Lucia–Taiwan relations refers to bilateral relations between the Republic of China and Saint Lucia. Relations existed first between 1984 and 1997, and then resumed from 2007 onwards.

==== St. Vincent and the Grenadines ====
Saint Vincent and the Grenadines–Taiwan relations refers to bilateral relations between Saint Vincent and the Grenadines and the Republic of China.

==== United States ====
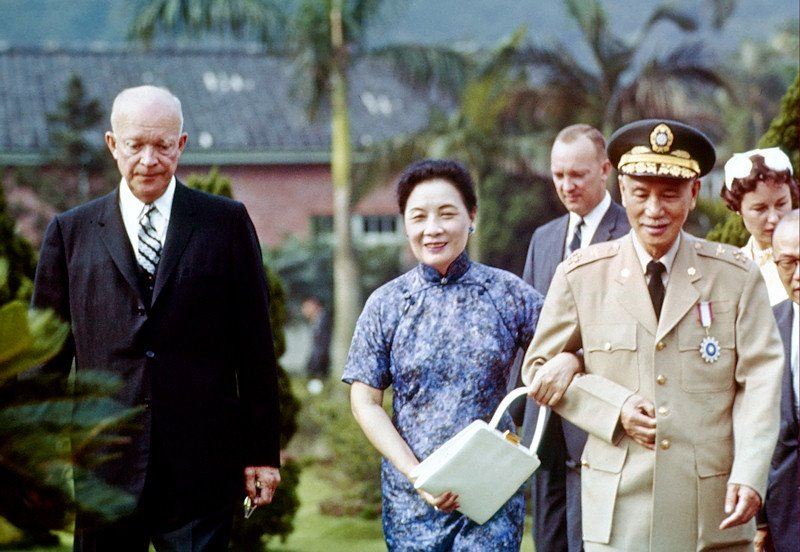
U.S. President Dwight D. Eisenhower and President Chiang Kai-shek of ROC in Taiwan, 1960

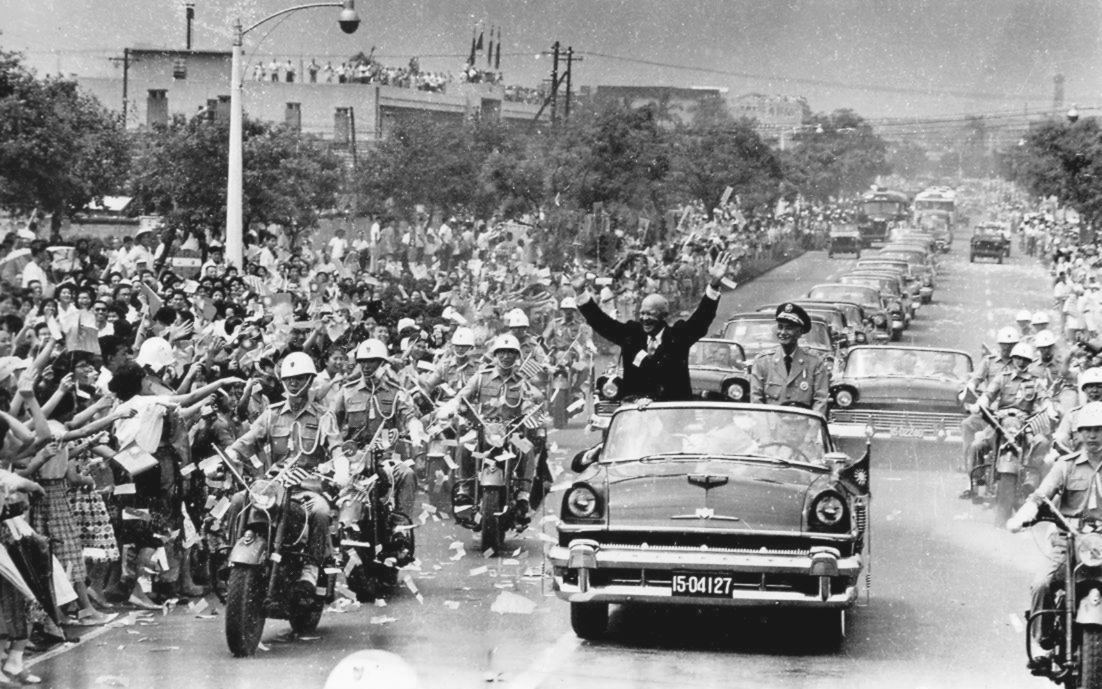
Chiang Kai-shek and Eisenhower wave to the crowd during visit to Taiwan in June 1960.

The ROC and the U.S. signed a formal treaty of commerce and navigation in 1948. ROC passport holders can thus be granted an E1 and E2 Visa, with indefinite renewal status, based on continued operation of their enterprise in the US. In 1979 the US recognised the PRC instead of ROC. Commercial (such as Trade and Investment Framework Agreement signed in 1994, TIFA), cultural and other substantial relations are currently governed, among other things, by the 1979 Taiwan Relations Act. The Act does not recognise the terminology of "Republic of China". United States policy does not support or oppose Taiwan's independence; instead US policy takes a neutral position of "non-support" for Taiwan's independence.

U.S. Deputy Assistant Secretary of State Alex Wong officially visited the ROC in March 2018 to protest the amendment of the PRC Constitution that removed Presidential tenure restrictions. In July 2002, Minister of Justice Chen Ding-nan became the first Taiwanese government official to be invited to visit the White House after the switch.

While the U.S. acknowledged PRC's one-China principle in 1979, it did not accept the PRC's claim on Taiwan. The unofficial name "Taiwan" was mentioned in the Three Communiqués between the United States and China. Consistent with the United States' one-China policy, raising the ROC flag on an official government facility's property within U.S. territory is not approved by the United States.

Taiwan passport holders are included in the U.S. Visa Waiver Program for a stay of 90 days.

After 1979, the US–Taiwan Business Council continued to facilitate commercial activity (mostly semiconductor technology related) and arms sales service. The United States House of Representatives added an amendment to the fiscal year 2016 US defense budget that includes a clause urging the ROC's participation in the biennial Rim of the Pacific (RIMPAC) exercise. The United States State Department has close bilateral cooperation with the ROC through Bureau of Educational and Cultural Affairs' Fulbright Program.

Recent disputes between the U.S. and the ROC include the ROC's ban on the import of U.S. beef and U.S. pork, which was resolved after the ROC adopted the new standard of a maximum residue limit for ractopamine in both beef and pork.

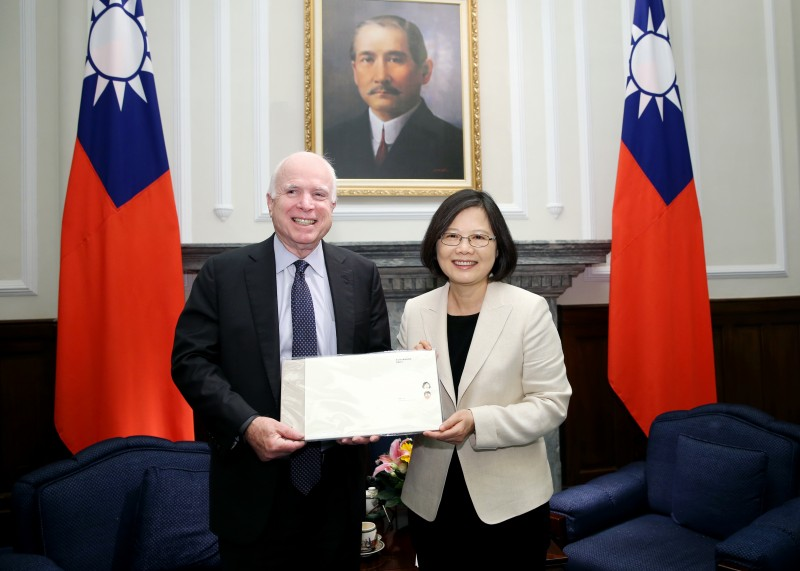
President Tsai Ing-wen meets with US Senate delegation led by John McCain, June 2016

In 2007, a measure was introduced into the United States Congress that would dramatically strengthen US ties with the ROC. The United States House of Representatives passed a resolution calling for the lifting of curbs on visits by high-ranking or top ROC officials. The Resolution noted that "whenever high-level visitors from the ROC, including the President, seek to come to the United States, their requests result in a period of complex, lengthy and humiliating negotiations." It further said: "Lifting these restrictions will help bring a friend and ally of the United States out of its isolation, which will be beneficial to peace and stability in the Asia–Pacific Region."

A bill was introduced to back the ROC's request to join the UN. The bill stated that the ROC and its 23 million people "deserve membership in the United Nations" and that the United States should fulfill a commitment "to more actively support Taiwan's membership in appropriate international organizations." The bill was introduced on 8 November 2007. The move was led by New Jersey Representative Scott Garrett.

Unofficial diplomatic relations are nevertheless maintained on both sides by means of de facto embassies, which are technically "private organizations" staffed and funded by the respective State Departments. The ROC's de facto embassy network is the Taipei Economic and Cultural Representative Office (TECRO) with offices in Washington, D.C., 12 other US cities and many other countries without official ties. The US' analogous organization is the American Institute in Taiwan (AIT). As of 2010, officials of the ROC had made quasi-official level US visits at a governmental and political level.

The U.S. State Department in July 2019 approved the selling of 108 M1A2T Abrams tanks and 250 Stinger missiles to Taiwan. The US Defense Security Cooperation Agency said that the arms sale serves "US national, economic, and security interests by supporting" Taiwan's "continuing efforts to modernize its armed forces and to maintain a credible defensive capability."

In August 2019, the Trump administration officially announced arms sale to Taiwan, worth USD eight billion, which includes the latest Lockheed Martin-built 66 new F-16C/D fighter jets. China immediately criticized the deal, citing it as detrimental to its sovereignty and interests.

On 9 August 2020, U.S. Secretary of Health and Human Services Alex Azar arrived in Taiwan. It marked the highest-level US official visit to Taiwan since 1979. As retaliation, the Chinese force jets flew over the mid-line of the Taiwan Strait, which is in the air defense identification zone. The visit was also the highest profile visit since the introduction of Taiwan Travel Act.

In August 2022, the U.S. House Speaker, Nancy Pelosi visited the island, an act that was strongly condemned by China.

China sent fighter jets and drones near Taiwan on 27 October 2024 in response to a new $2 billion U.S. arms package for Taiwan, escalating tensions in the Taiwan Strait.

=== Oceania ===
The ROC maintains diplomatic relations with three countries in Oceania: the Marshall Islands, Palau, and Tuvalu. The PRC has relations with 13 others (including Australia, the Cook Islands, the Federated States of Micronesia, Fiji, Kiribati, Nauru, New Zealand, Niue, Papua New Guinea, Samoa, Solomon Islands, Tonga, and Vanuatu). The Pacific is an area of intense and continuous diplomatic competition between Beijing and Taipei, with several countries (Kiribati, Nauru, Solomon Islands, and Vanuatu) having switched diplomatic support from one to the other at least once. Both the PRC and the ROC provide development aid to their respective allies. In exchange, ROC's allies support its membership bid in the United Nations. The ROC is one of Tuvalu's most important economic partners.

==== History ====
In September 2006, the first regional summit of Taiwan's Pacific Island allies took place, hosted by Palau in Koror City. The meeting brought together President Chen and delegates from the Marshall Islands, Tuvalu, Nauru, Palau, Solomon Islands and Kiribati. It was to become a regular event, known as the Taiwan–Pacific Allies Summit. A second regional meeting was hosted by the Marshall Islands in October, and President Chen attended. This resulted in the Majuro Declaration, in which Taiwan's six Pacific allies re-stated their recognition of the ROC's sovereignty, and promised to support the ROC's attempts to join the United Nations.

In June 2007, the ROC donated an aid package of €700,000, distributed among eight Pacific regional organisations.

In January 2008, following the victory of the Kuomintang in the ROC's elections, Kuomintang MP Yang Li-huan stated that under the new government Taiwan's interest in the Pacific could decrease. Three days later, however, it was confirmed that ROC Vice-president Annette Lu would lead a diplomatic visit to the Marshall Islands, Nauru and Solomon Islands.

In March 2008, President-elect Ma was reported as saying that his government would put an end to Taiwanese "cheque-book diplomacy" in the Pacific (or more specifically, similar to the condition of cestui que use diplomacy). In May of that same year, Ma called for what he referred to as a "cease-fire" in the competition between the ROC and the PRC for diplomatic allies. This followed a scandal due to allegations that Taiwan's Foreign Minister James Huang had attempted to buy Papua New Guinea's diplomatic allegiance. Papua New Guinea's foreign minister Sam Abal subsequently confirmed that his country had no intention of recognising the ROC.

In October, Taiwan cancelled a scheduled summit with its Pacific Island allies. Although the authorities cited "preparation problems", Radio Australia commented that "the decision appears to be an attempt by the new administration of President Ma Ying-jeou to keep the island's diplomatic activities low-profile and avoid offending China". In June 2009, the Ministry of Foreign Affairs announced that President Ma would "attend a [...] leadership summit between Taiwan and its South Pacific allies" in autumn. The summit, hosted by Solomon Islands, would be attended by the "heads of state of Taiwan's six allies in the region" and would focus on "countering the current economic contraction, climate change and how to strengthen the fisheries industry". Upon announcing the summit, the Ministry added that Ma had "developed a fondness for the Pacific region during his previous visit to Solomon Islands when he saw a handful of children at a market selling betel nuts and watermelons while wearing shirts donated by the people of Taiwan".

In July 2009, the ROC donated over €40,000 in a scholarship scheme benefiting students from Pacific countries, including those, such as Fiji or Papua New Guinea, that do not grant it diplomatic recognition. It donated €288,000 for regional development assistance programmes, to be used notably on access to water, sanitation and hygiene, renewable energy, solar photovoltaic assessments, fisheries management, education and youth training.

Taiwan has asked to be recognised as an official dialogue partner of the Pacific Islands Forum. That status is currently awarded to the PRC.

==== Australia ====
In February 2008, Australia reportedly "chastised Taiwan for its renewed push for independence" and "reiterated its support for a one-China policy". Australia-Taiwan relations are growing in non-political areas including an annual Bilateral Economic Consultation and both sides also established Joint Energy, Mineral, Trade and Investment Cooperation Consultation (JEMTIC) as well as an Agriculture Working Group meeting. Australia does not object Taiwan's participation in international organizations where consensus has been achieved, and Australia-Taiwan relations are commercially and unofficially-driven, such as the Australia-Taiwan Business Council, along with contacts in education, science, sports and arts.

Taiwan is unofficially represented in Australia by the Taipei Economic and Cultural Office in Canberra (which has branches in Sydney, Melbourne and Brisbane) while Australia is similarly represented by the Australian Office in Taipei. Taiwan has an official, government co-sponsored branch office of Taiwan External Trade Development Council in Sydney. The Australian Consulate-General in Hong Kong is responsible for Visa and Citizenship matters for applicants in Taiwan. Perth has sister city relations with Taipei City and Brisbane has sister city relations with Kaohsiung City.

==== Fiji ====
The ROC set up a trade mission in Fiji in 1971. In 1975, PRC established diplomatic relation with Fiji. The trade center became the Trade Mission of the ROC to the Republic of Fiji in 1988. In 1996, ROC and Fiji signed a 'mutual recognition' communique and Fiji set up its representative office named Fiji Trade and Tourism Representative Office in 1997 in Taipei. The Fiji office closed on 10 May 2017.

==== Kiribati ====
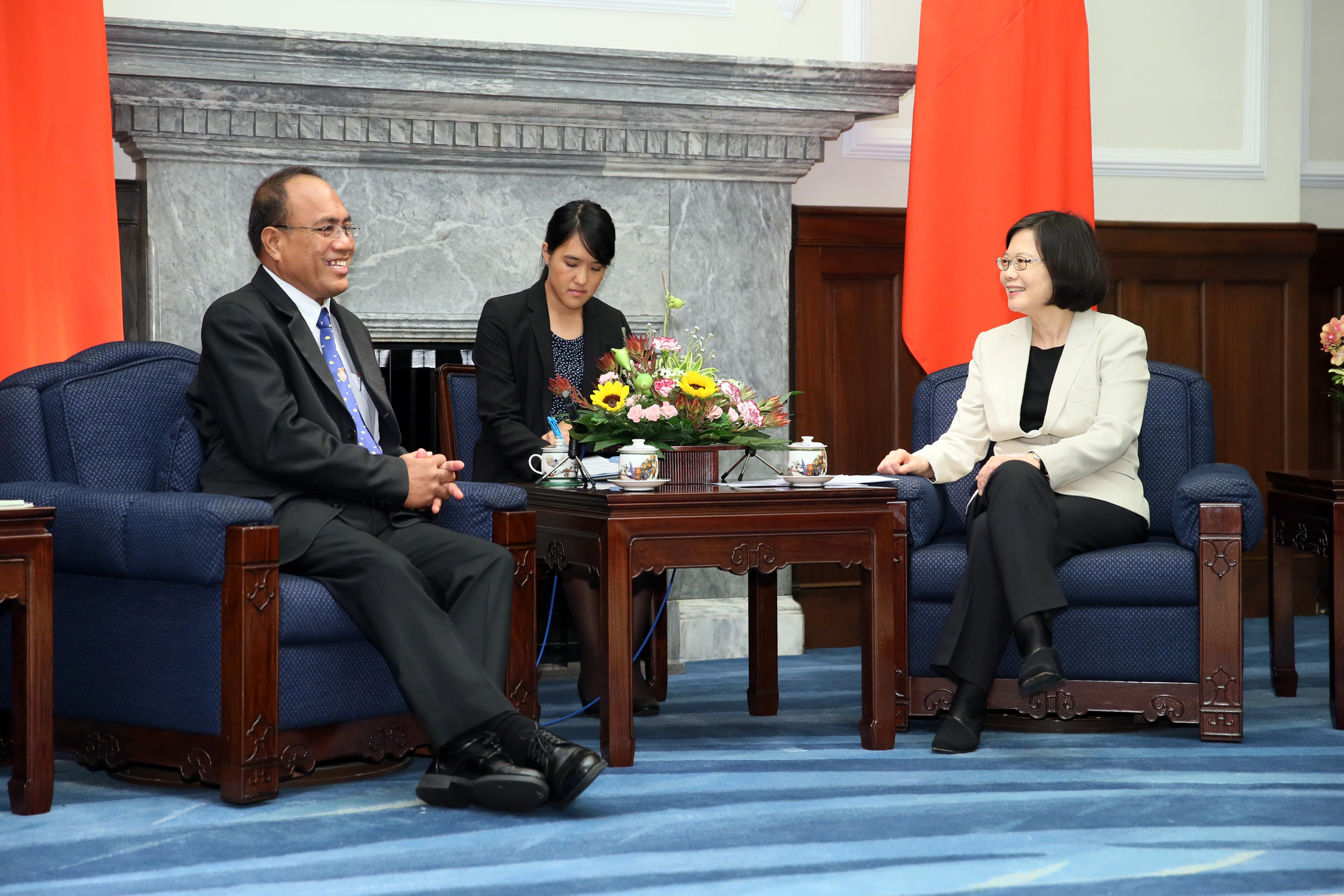
Kiribati President Taneti Mamau and President Tsai Ing-wen in Taiwan

Kiribati, under the government of President Taneti Mamau, initially recognised the ROC but switched to the PRC later on.

From 1980 to 2003, Kiribati recognised the PRC. Relations between China and Kiribati then became a contentious political issue within Kiribati. President Teburoro Tito was ousted in a parliamentary vote of no confidence in 2003, over his refusal to clarify the details of a land lease that had enabled Beijing to maintain a satellite-tracking station in the country since 1997, and over Chinese ambassador Ma Shuxue's acknowledged monetary donation to "a cooperative society linked to Tito". In the ensuing election, Anote Tong won the presidency after "stirring suspicions that the station was being used to spy on US installations in the Pacific". Tong had previously pledged to "review" the lease.

In November 2003, Tarawa established diplomatic relations with Taipei and Beijing severed its relations with the country. For the PRC, the presence of the satellite-tracking station had made relations with Kiribati relatively important; the station had, in particular, been used to track Yang Liwei's spaceflight. Therefore, for three weeks the PRC called upon I-Kiribati President Anote Tong to break off relations with Taiwan and re-affirm his support for the "One China" policy. Only after those three weeks did the PRC sever relations, thereby losing the right to maintain its satellite-tracking base. The ROC began providing economic aid to Kiribati, while Kiribati began supporting Taiwan in the United Nations.

In 2004, President Tong said he believed the PRC was trying to influence his country. The comment was mainly due to the PRC's refusal to remove all its personnel from its closed embassy. Tong stated that the Chinese personnel, who remained in Kiribati against his wishes, were handing out anti-government pamphlets; he told New Zealand journalist Michael Field: "I am sure if we did this in Beijing, we would be in jail in half a second". Tong's brother and main political opponent, Harry Tong, responded by accusing Taiwan of excessive influence on Kiribati, notably of influencing the country's clergy.

In 2008, Taiwan settled Kiribati's unpaid bills to Air Pacific, enabling the airline to maintain its services from Tarawa to Kiritimati.

In November 2010, despite their lack of diplomatic relations, the PRC was one of fifteen countries to attend the Tarawa Climate Change Conference in Kiribati, and one of twelve to sign the resulting Ambo Declaration on climate change. On 20 September 2019, Kiribati switched diplomatic relation from ROC to PRC.

==== Marshall Islands ====
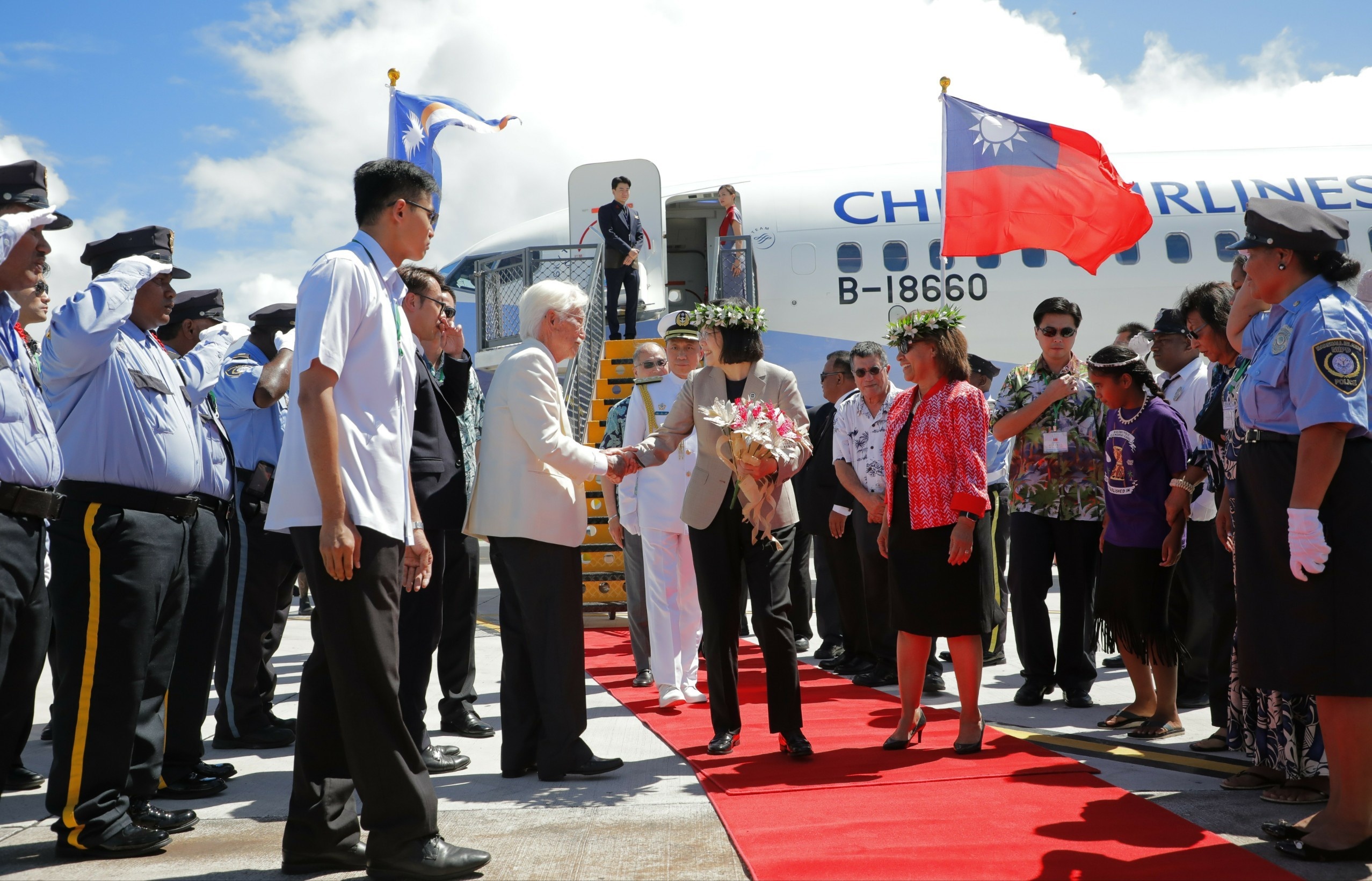
Marshall Islands President H.E. Hilda C. Heine with Taiwan President Tsai Ing-wen in October 2017

The Marshall Islands recognise the ROC and maintain an embassy in Taipei. The magazine Islands Business reported that President Litokwa Tomeing, elected in January 2008, might turn instead to the PRC. However, in office Tomeing expressed continued support for ties with Taiwan and met with ROC Vice President Annette Lu when she visited the Marshall Islands on 29 January 2008. The current Marshallese ambassador to Taiwan is Anjanette Kattil.

==== Micronesia ====
Micronesia recognized the Republic of China until 1989, switching its foreign recognition to the People's Republic of China. In 2023, shortly before his term as president ended, David Panuelo wrote an open letter accusing Beijing of bribing Micronesian officials for recognition and to stay out of a potential conflict, as well as spying on the Micronesian government and personally surveilling him. He furthermore advocated for returning to relations with the Republic of China and held meetings with Taiwanese foreign minister Joseph Wu to determine if it was possible.

==== Nauru ====
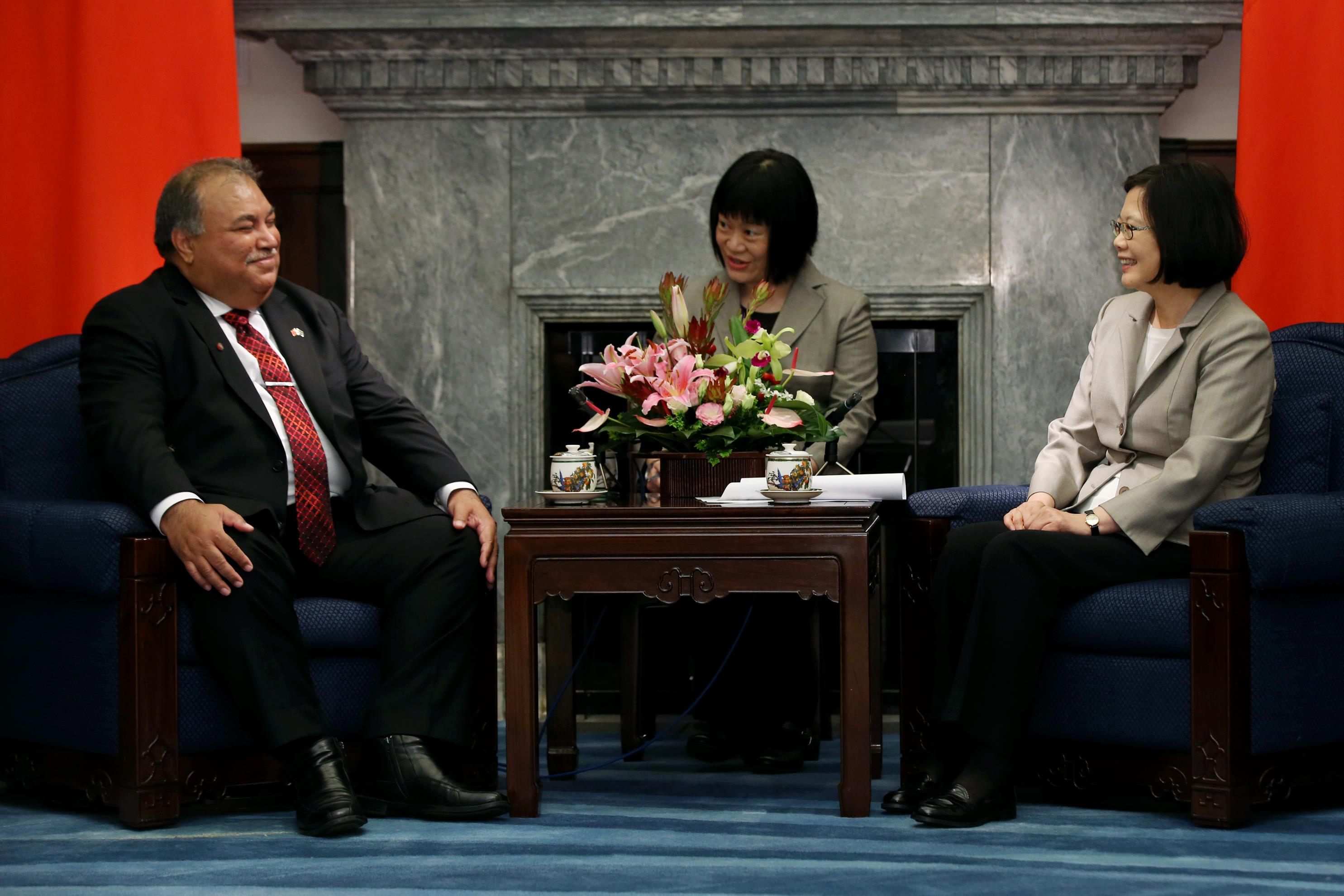
Nauru President Baron Waqa and President Tsai Ing-wen in Taiwan

Nauru recognized the Republic of China until 2024, before switching its recognition to the People's Republic of China.

In 1980, Nauru established official relations with the ROC. In 2002, however, the government of René Harris established relations with the PRC, and adopted the One China Policy. Consequently, Taiwan severed its relations with Nauru, and accused the PRC of having bought Nauru's allegiance with financial aid of over €90,000,000. A reporter for The Age agreed, stating that "Beijing recently bought off a threat by Nauru to revert to Taiwan only six months after opening ties with the mainland, offering a large loan to Nauru's near-destitute Government".

In 2003, Nauru closed its newly established embassy in Beijing. Two years later, ROC President Chen met Nauruan President Ludwig Scotty in the Marshall Islands. In May 2005, the ROC and Nauru re-established diplomatic relations, and opened embassies in each other's capitals. The PRC consequently severed its relations with Nauru.

The ROC is one of Nauru's two foremost economic aid partners (with Australia). In return, Nauru uses its seat in the United Nations to support the ROC's admittance proposal. Taiwan provides regular medical assistance to Nauru, sending specialised doctors to the country's only hospital.

In 2007, Scotty was re-elected, amidst claims that his electoral campaign had been funded by Taiwan. Scotty's opponents claimed that the ROC wanted to ensure that a pro-Taiwan government remained in power. Scotty was replaced by Marcus Stephen in December 2007. Following Stephen's election, President Chen telephoned him to congratulate him, assure him of the ROC's continued assistance for Nauru, request Nauru's continued support in return, and invite him to visit Taiwan.

Nauru remains the focus of diplomatic competition between Beijing and Taipei. In 2006, according to the New Statesman, President Scotty "was allegedly accosted by a horde of screaming Chinese officials who tried to drag him on to a plane to Beijing just as he was boarding one bound for Taipei".

In 2008, Nauru co-submitted a proposal to the United Nations, requesting that the United Nations General Assembly consider enabling "Taiwan's participation in the activities of UN specialized agencies". The proposal was rejected.

In 2011 WikiLeaks revealed that Taiwan had been paying a "monthly stipend" to Nauruan government ministers in exchange for their continued support, as well as a smaller sum to other members of parliament, as "project funding that requires minimal accounting". Reporting on the story, the Brisbane Times wrote: "One MP reportedly used his Taiwanese stipend to buy daily breakfast for all schoolchildren in his district, while others were happy to just pocket the cash". A "former Australian diplomat with close knowledge of politics in Nauru" stated that Nauruan President Marcus Stephen, Foreign Minister Kieren Keke and former President Ludwig Scotty, among others, had all accepted "under the counter" funding from Taiwan. The leaks revealed that "Chinese [PRC] agents had also sought to influence Nauru's elections through cash payments to voters, with at least $40,000 distributed in one instance in 2007".

WikiLeaks also revealed that Australia had, at one time, been "pushing" Nauru to break its relations with Taiwan and establish relations with the PRC instead. Then President Scotty had reportedly resisted on the grounds that it was "none of Australia's business".

In late 2011, Taiwan "doubled its health aid" to Nauru, notably providing a resident medical team on a five-year appointment.

From 11 June 2013 to 27 August 2019, under the government of President Baron Waqa, Nauru maintained its recognition of the Republic of China.

In 2018, a diplomatic row between the PRC and Nauru occurred at the Pacific Islands Forum when Nauruans would only stamp entry visas on personal passports of Mainland diplomats rather than diplomatic ones.

On 15 January 2024, Nauru chose to recognise the People's Republic of China, severing diplomatic ties with Taiwan.

==== New Zealand ====
While New Zealand does not have formal diplomatic relations with Taiwan, the two countries still maintain informal trade, economic, and cultural relations. Taiwan has two Economic and Cultural offices in Auckland and Wellington. New Zealand also has a Commerce and Industry Office in Taipei.

On 10 July 2013, New Zealand and ROC signed a bilateral Economic Cooperation Agreement.

==== Palau ====
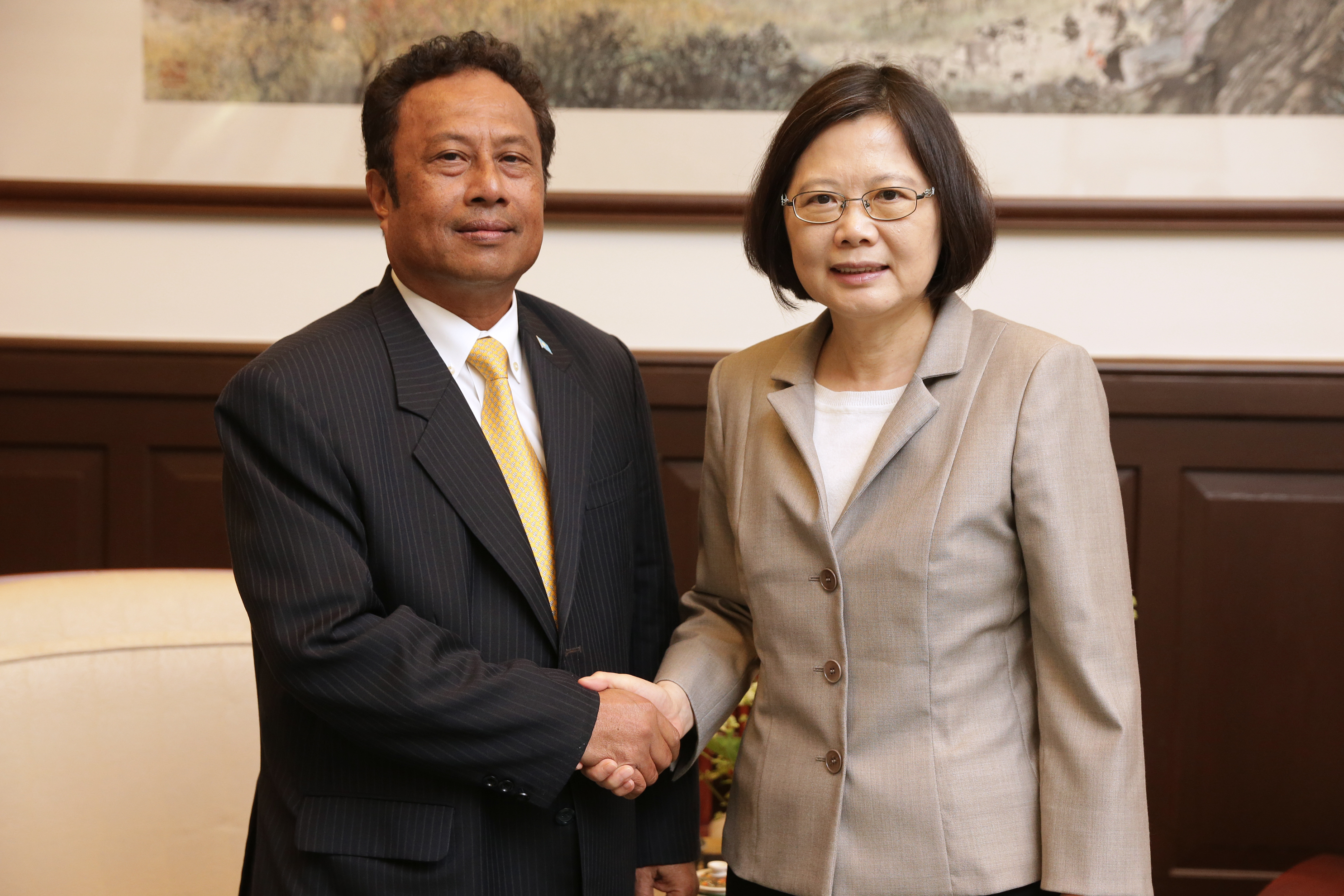
Palau President Tommy Remengesau and President Tsai Ing-wen in Taiwan

Palau recognises the ROC, and is one of the few countries to maintain an embassy in Taipei. Diplomatic relations began in 1999, five years after Palaun independence. ROC maintains an embassy in Koror City. The ROC provides scholarships to Palauan students, as well as computers for Palauan schools. In 2008, Mario Katosang, Palau's Minister of Education, stated:

We were given 100 Windows-based computers by Taiwan. The education sector uses predominantly Apple Macintosh computers, so I mentioned that we may also need software. Taiwan immediately delivered 100 brand new copies of Windows XP, and offered to train our computer technicians.

Travel from the Mainland to Palau is illegal.

Taiwan and Palau entered into a maritime cooperation agreement in March 2019. Taiwan agreed to fund the building of an eight-ton patrol boat in Palau. The agreement also allows Taiwanese patrol boats to resupply in Palau, personnel exchanges, and joint training. The first joint exercise occurred on 23 March when the Taiwanese coast guard frigate Hsun Hu No. 7 conducted a patrol mission with Palauan vessels.

==== Papua New Guinea ====
In 2005, Papua New Guinea, along with Fiji, supported Taiwan's wish to join the World Health Organization.

In July 2026, Papua New Guinea announced the closure of Taiwan's representative office in Port Moresby in order to strengthen relations with China.

==== Solomon Islands ====
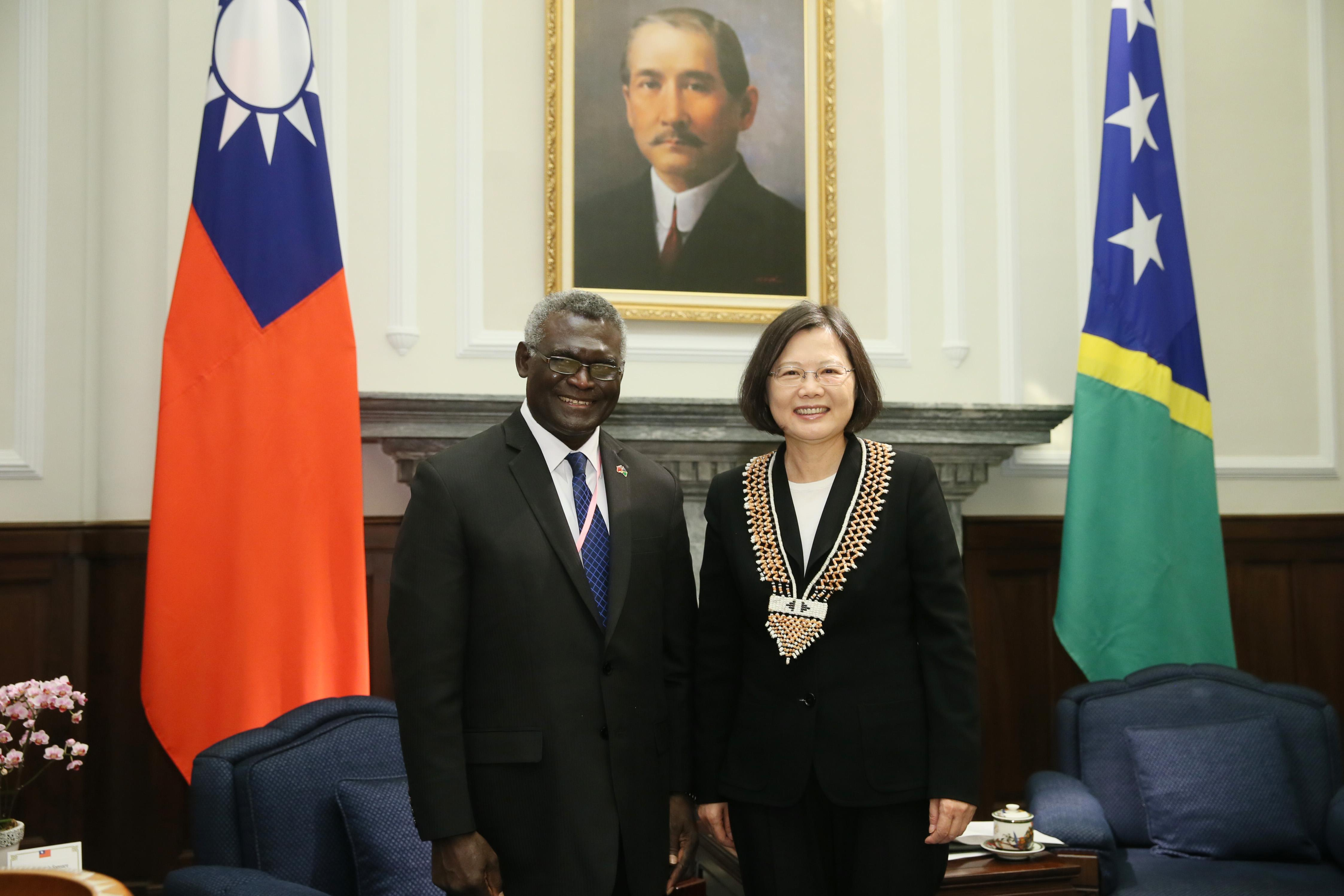
Solomon Islands Prime Minister Manasseh Sogavare meets with Taiwanese President Tsai Ing-wen in July 2016

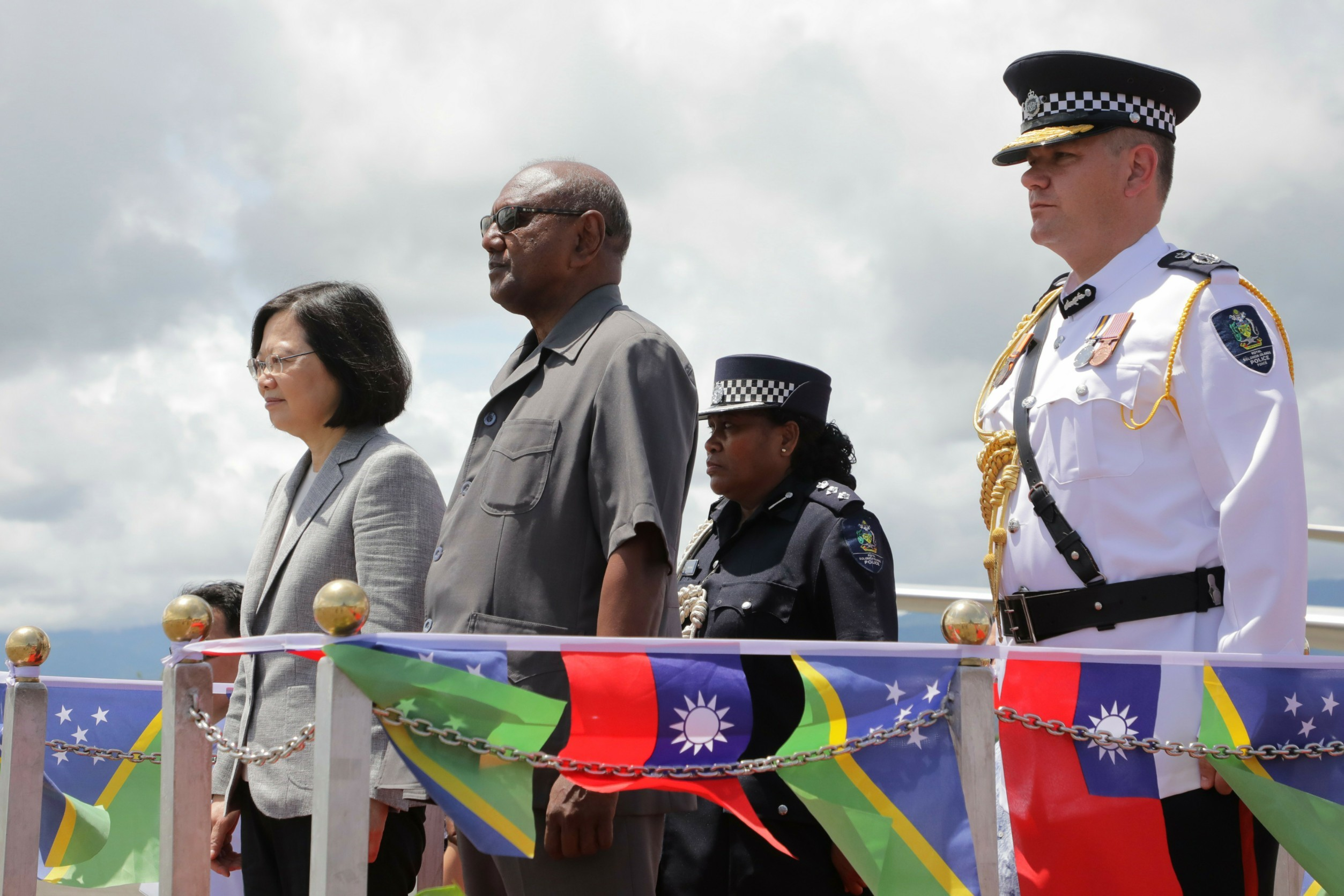
Picture from President Tsai Ing-wen's state visit to Solomon Islands in November 2017

The two countries established diplomatic relations on 23 May 1983. A ROC consulate general in Honiara was upgraded to an embassy two years later. Since 2011, the Solomons' ambassador to the ROC has been Laurie Chan, a Solomon Islands national of Chinese ethnic background, and a former Solomon Islands Minister of Foreign Affairs who supported his country's continued relations with Taiwan.

After pro-Taiwan Prime Minister Manasseh Sogavare was ousted in a vote of no confidence in December 2007, and replaced by Derek Sikua, ROC President Chen telephoned Prime Minister Sikua, offering his congratulations and Taiwan's continued aid, and requested the Sikua government's continued diplomatic support. Chen also invited Sikua to visit Taiwan, which he did in March 2008. Sikua was welcomed with military honours by Chen, who stated: "Taiwan is the Solomon Islands' most loyal ally. [...] Taiwan will never forsake the people or government of the Solomon Islands." Solomon Islands has continued to recognise the ROC under Sikua's leadership.

In June 2019, secret negotiations with Australia were reported that involved the Solomon Islands reassessing if they wanted to switch recognition to the PRC with an internal deadline of mid-September to make a change or leave the status quo. In early September, they announced their intention to change recognition to the PRC. On 16 September, it officially broke its ties with Taiwan, switching its recognition to the PRC.

In June 2020 the Premier of Malaita Province, a critic of the switch in recognition, accepted rice from Taiwan as state aid. This was criticised by the national government, who called on him to respect the country's foreign policy.

==== Tuvalu ====
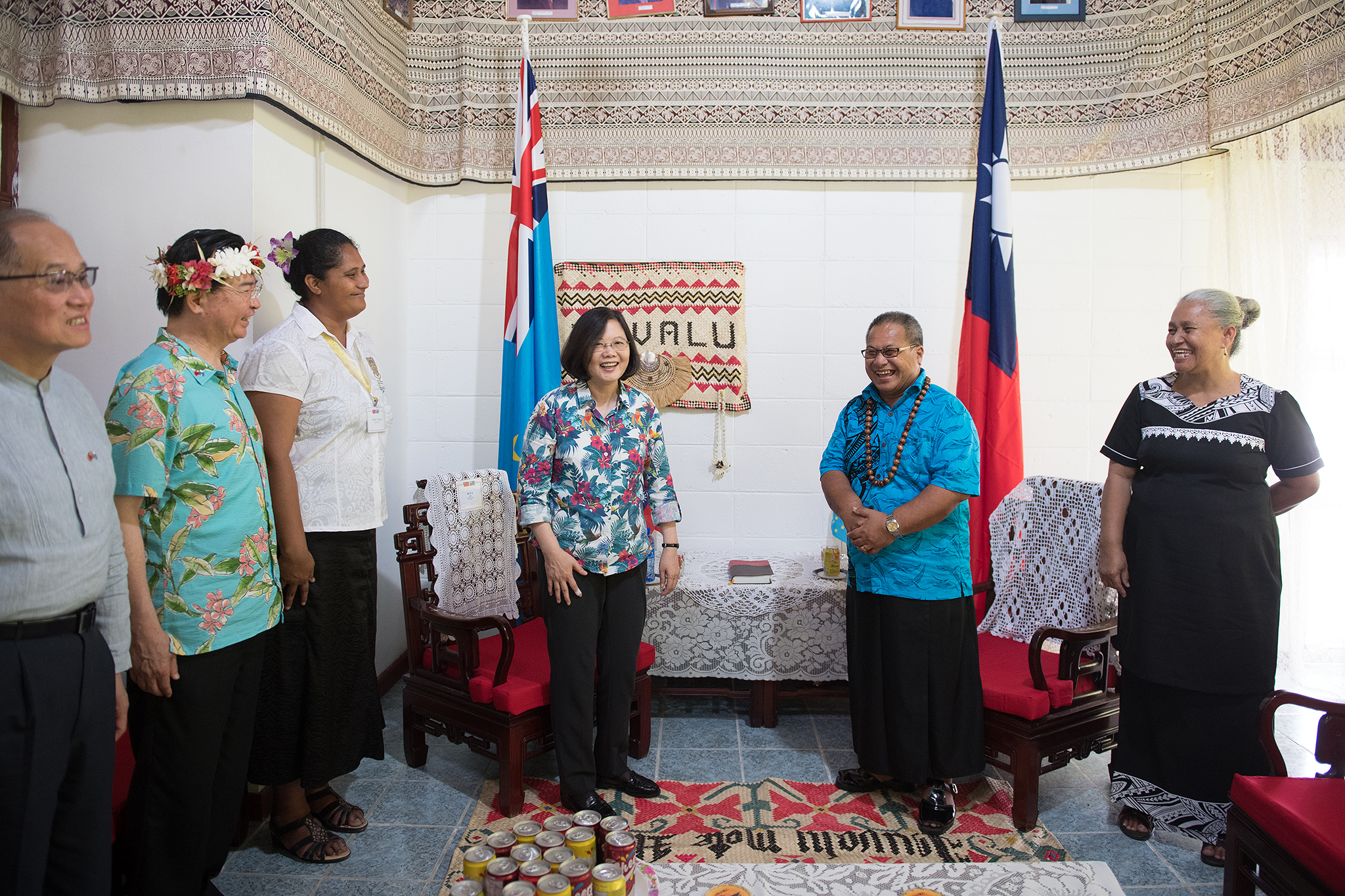
President Tsai visits Governor-General of Tuvalu Iakoba Italeli in November 2017

Tuvalu recognises the ROC; Taiwan maintains the only foreign resident embassy in Tuvalu, in Funafuti.

Tuvalu supports the ROC's bid to join the United Nations, and Taiwan has provided Tuvalu with mobile medical missions.

In 2006, Taiwan reacted to reports that the PRC was attempting to draw Tuvalu away from the ROC. Taiwan consequently strengthened its weakening diplomatic relations with Tuvalu.

In 2019 – shortly after Kiribati and the Solomon Islands ended their relations with the Republic of China – Tuvalu reiterated their support for the ROC.

==== Vanuatu ====
Vanuatu recognises the PRC. In November 2004, Prime Minister Serge Vohor briefly established diplomatic relations with Taiwan, before he was ousted for that reason in a vote of no confidence.

=== South America ===
==== Argentina ====
The relationship between the Argentine Republic and the Republic of China (commonly known as Taiwan) is referred to as Argentina–Taiwan relations. From 1945 to 1972, the two countries had official diplomatic relations, and after the severance of diplomatic relations, they set up representative offices in each other's capitals with the functions of embassies.

==== Brazil ====
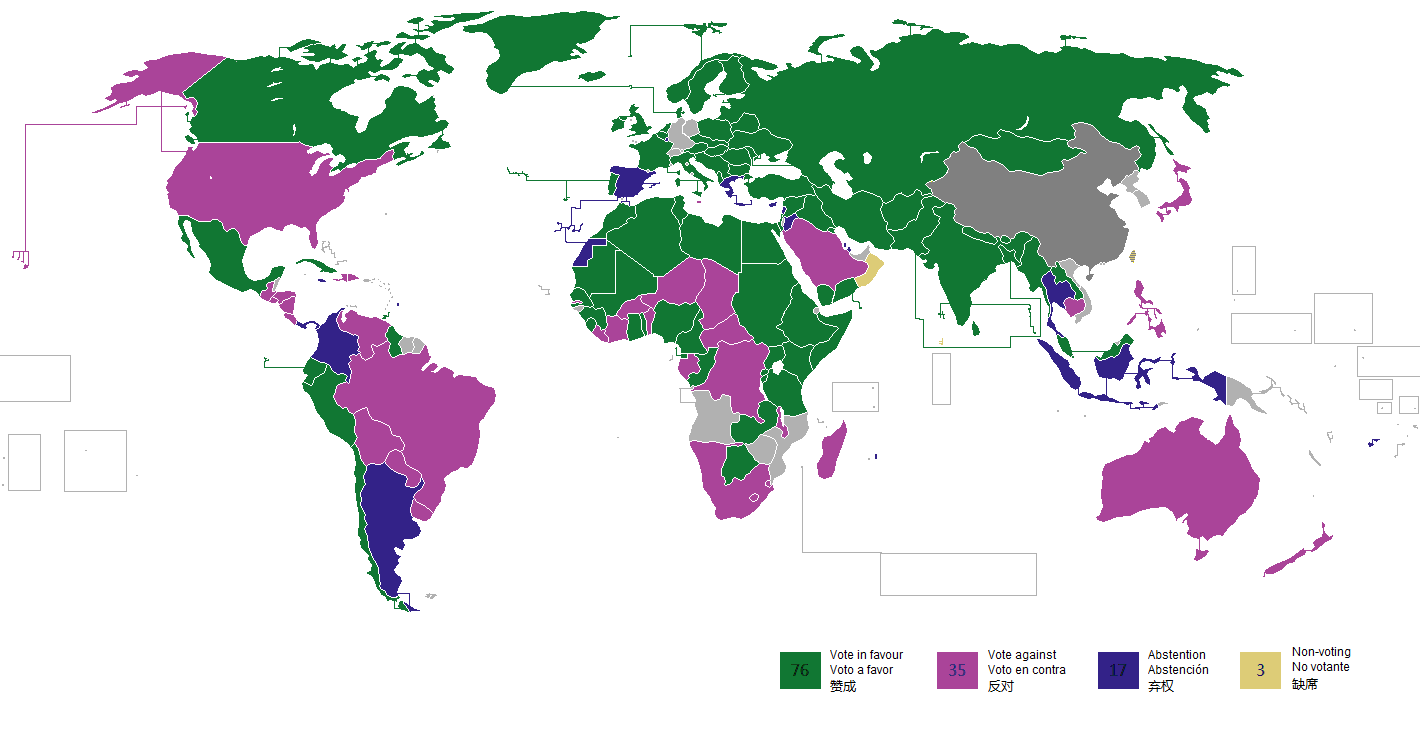
Brazil opposed the replacement in UN-2758

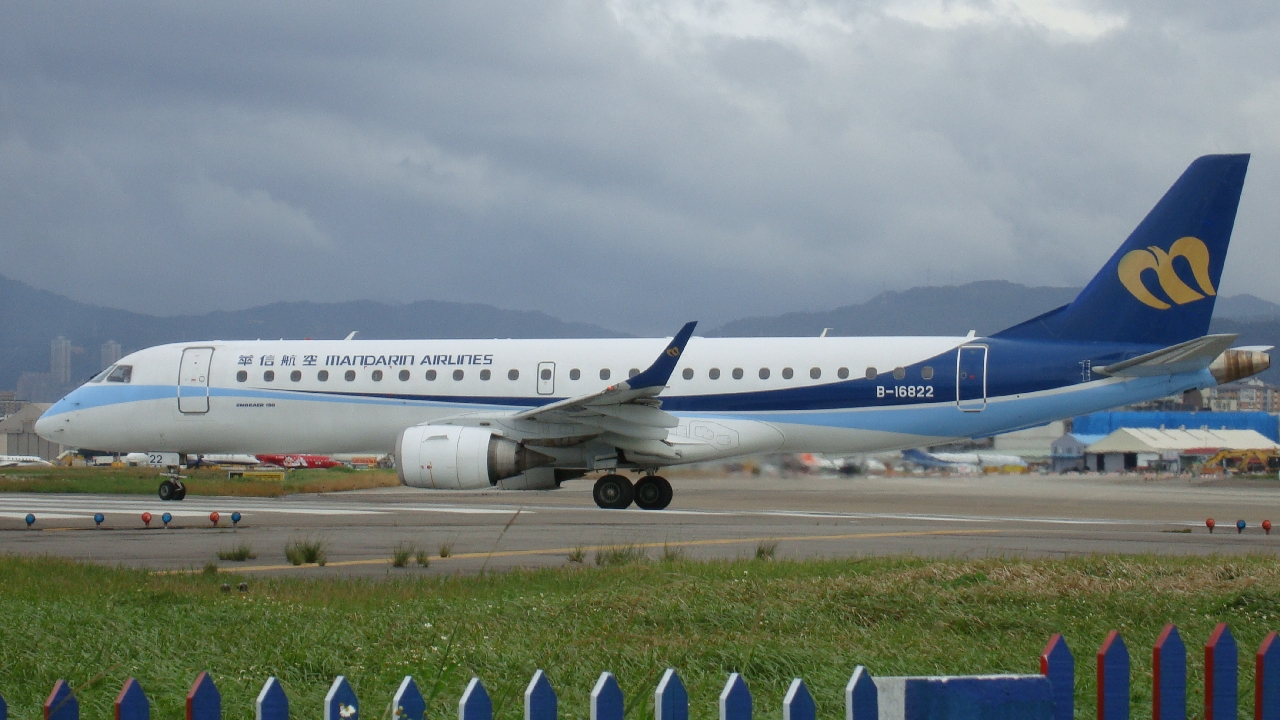
Mandarin Airlines Embraer-190 aircraft which was made in Brazil

The Republic of China (Taiwan) and the Federative Republic of Brazil do not have official diplomatic relations, as Brazil acknowledges the One-China policy. However, the two nations maintain unofficial diplomatic relations via economic and cultural offices.

==== Chile ====
Chile–Taiwan relations refer to the bilateral relations between the Republic of Chile and the Republic of China (Taiwan).

Like most countries in the world, Chile adheres to a One China policy, therefore it does not maintain official diplomatic ties with Taiwan. However, that does not prevent the two nations from working closely, due to similarities between both countries. Both countries are technically democratic, have strong economic performances and are allies of the United States. Both countries are urging to extend their cooperation together.

==== Paraguay ====
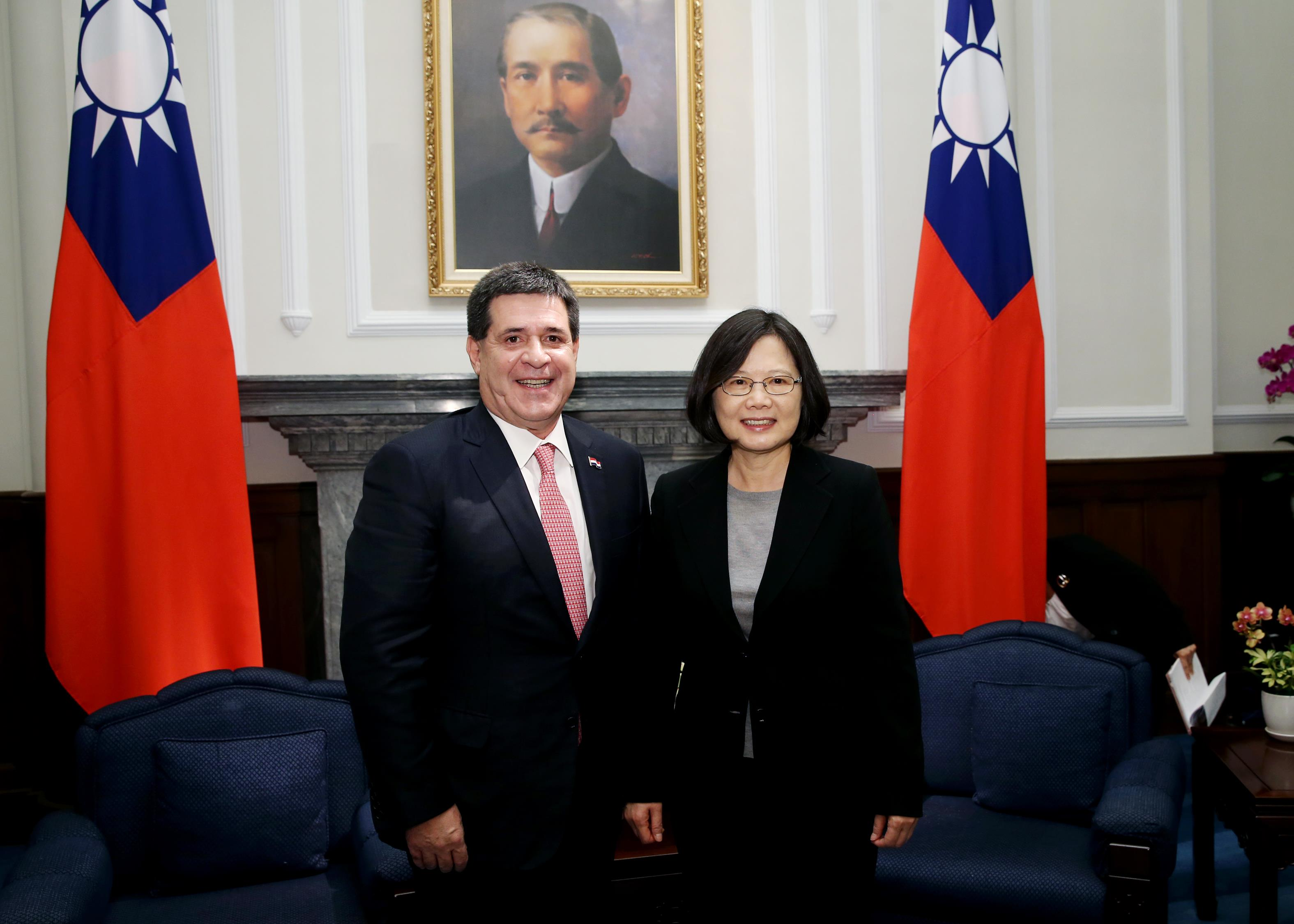
Paraguay President Horacio Cartes and President Tsai Ing-wen in Taiwan

Paraguay recognizes Taiwan. Paraguayan leader General Alfredo Stroessner was a partner of Generalissimo Chiang. Many Paraguayan officers trained in Fu Hsing Kang College in the ROC.

Stroessner's 1989 ousting and his successor Andrés Rodríguez's reinventing himself as a democratically elected president, were immediately followed by invitations from Beijing to switch diplomatic recognition. However, the Taiwanese ambassador, Wang Sheng, and his diplomats were able to convince the Paraguayans that continuing the relationship with the ROC, and thus keeping the ROC's development assistance and access to the ROC's markets, would be more advantageous for Paraguay. Recognition of Taiwan was a matter of debate in the 2023 Paraguayan general election, with bilateral relations maintained after the results.

==== Peru ====
Peru–Taiwan relations are the bilateral relations between the Republic of China (Taiwan) and the Republic of Peru. Relations were officially severed in 1971, but are unofficially maintained through the presence of representative offices in each country's capital city.

==== Venezuela ====
In 2007, the Venezuelan government refused to renew visas for five members of the ROC commercial representation in Caracas.

Relations with Venezuela have worsened because of the increasing partnership between the government of Hugo Chávez and the People's Republic of China, which has led to a more overt rejection of the Taiwan's legitimacy by Venezuela. During the 2019 Venezuelan presidential crisis, Taiwan has been supportive of Juan Guaidó and the opposition-led National Assembly.

== Multilateral relations ==
=== Arab world ===
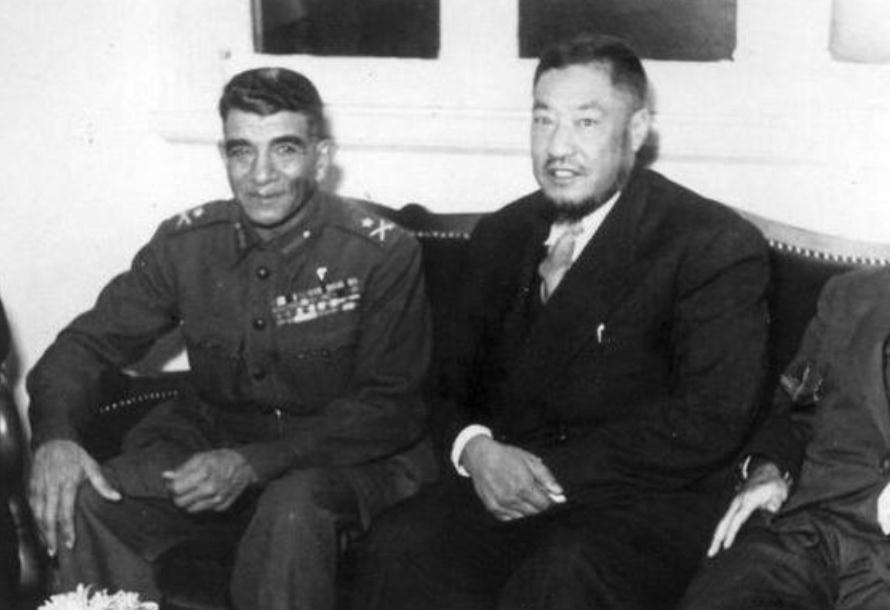
Egyptian President Muhammad Naguib with Chinese Muslim Kuomintang National Revolutionary Army General Ma Bufang

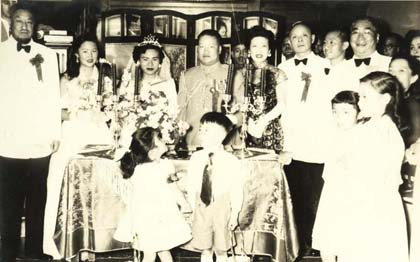
ROC Chinese Muslim National Revolutionary Army General Ma Bufang with the Kuomintang ambassador to Saudi Arabia in 1955

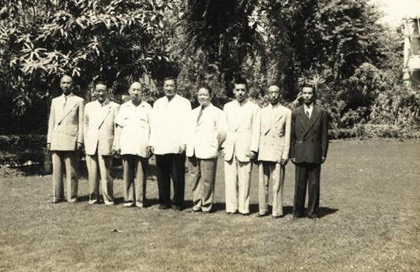
Ma Bufang and family in Egypt in 1954

Egypt maintained relations until 1956, when Gamal Abdel Nasser cut off relations and recognised the PRC. Ma Bufang, who was then living in Egypt, was ordered to move to Saudi Arabia, and became the ROC ambassador to Saudi Arabia. Saudi Arabia ended its diplomatic relations with the ROC in 1990. Ambassador Wang Shi-ming was a Chinese Muslim, and the ROC ambassador to Kuwait. The ROC also maintained relations with Libya.

=== European Union ===
The European Union has emphasized human rights in its relations with Taiwan. It is the largest source of foreign direct investment to Taiwan. The European Union has unofficial relations with Taiwan through the European Economic and Trade Office, which was opened on 10 March 2003. Taipei is one of the major trading partners via the European Free Trade Association, and a trading partner with the Eurozone. Taiwanese passport holders with a listed identity card number do not require a Schengen visa to visit the Schengen Area; reciprocally, the ROC has also eliminated visa requirements for citizens of all EU countries. EU-Taiwan relations were debated in the European Parliament. Sixteen EU member states have established offices in Taipei, along with some functional offices. Taipei Representative Office in the EU and Belgium is the unofficial diplomatic representation of Taiwan in the EU. Chinese Taipei is an observer in the OECD, which is headquartered in Paris, France. ROC's Civil Service Protection and Training Commission (CSPTC) and the Belgian Training Institute of the Federal Administration (TIFA) signed Memorandum of Understanding on 7 November 2014 for workshop attendance of public servants that highlighted leadership, innovation and conflict management, as well as global competitiveness strategies in Brussels. The EU rejects granting Mainland China market economy status.

== Overseas representation in Taiwan ==
=== Embassies ===
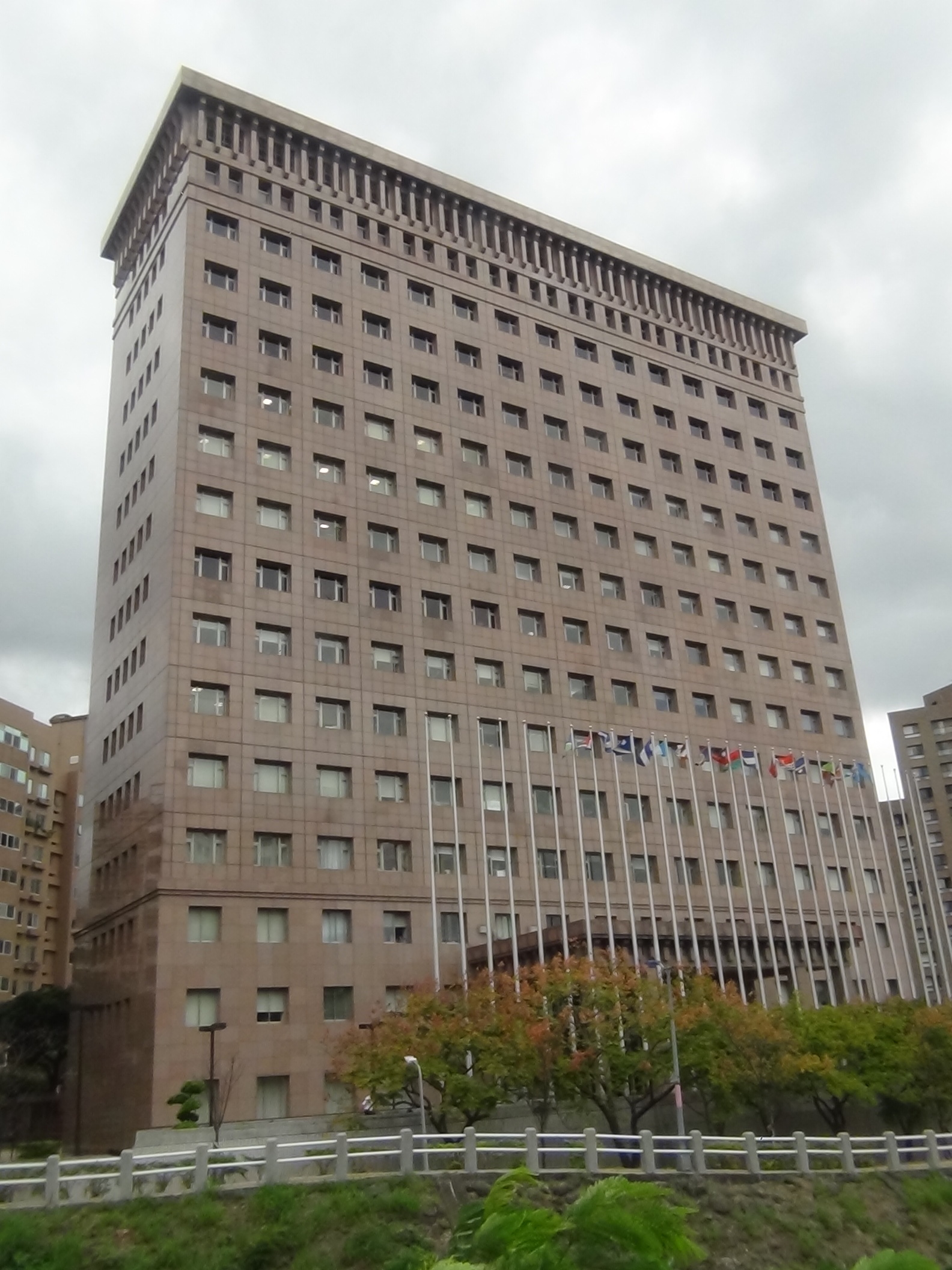
Embassy area

==== Africa ====
- Eswatini

==== Europe ====
- Holy See (Vatican City)

==== North America ====
- Belize
- Guatemala
- Haiti
- Saint Kitts and Nevis
- Saint Lucia
- Saint Vincent and the Grenadines

==== Oceania ====
- Marshall Islands
- Palau
- Tuvalu

==== South America ====
- Paraguay

=== Offices ===
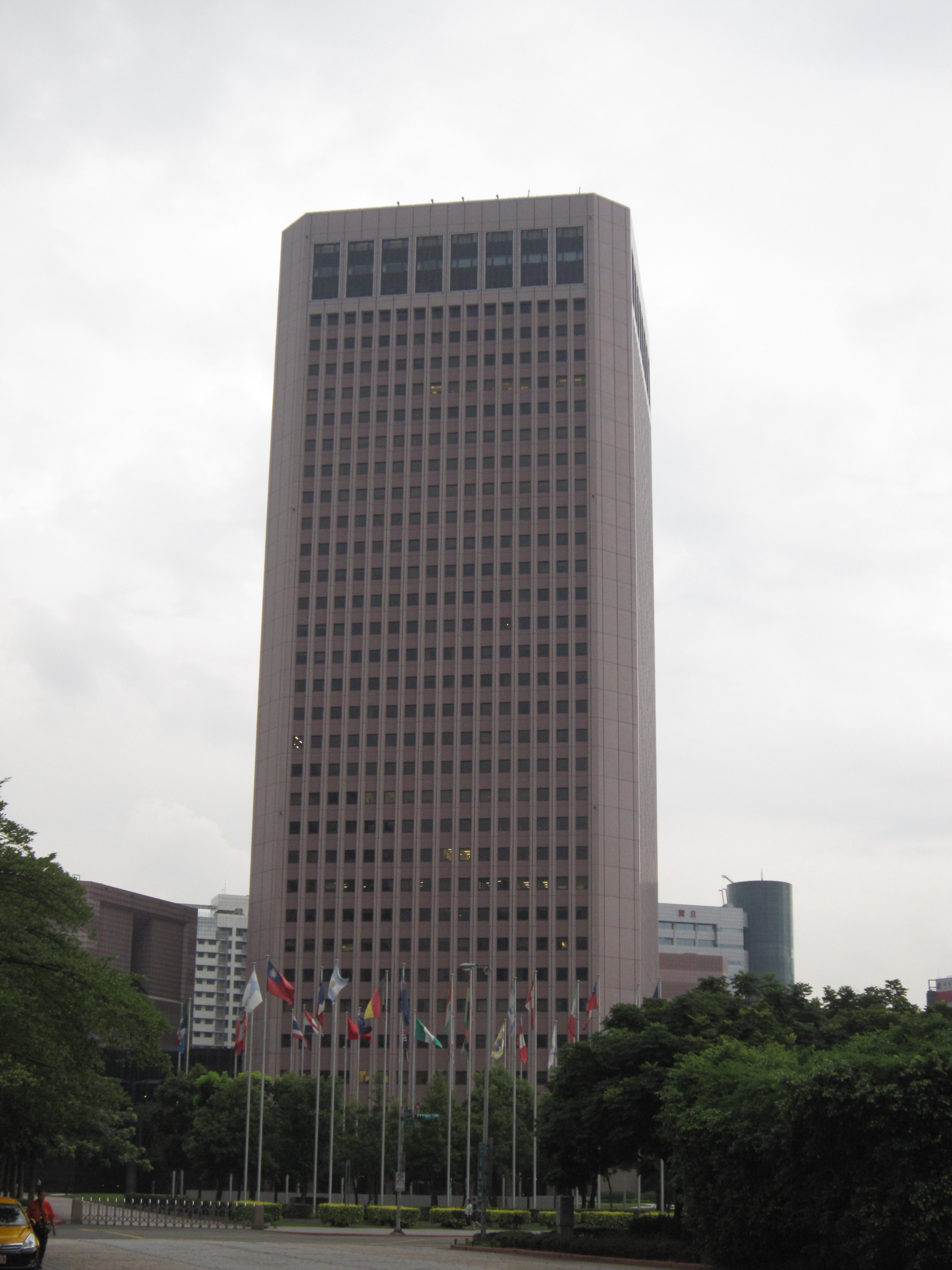
Office area

==== Africa ====
- Nigeria
- Somaliland
- South Africa

==== Asia ====
- Bahrain
- Brunei
- India
- Indonesia
- Israel
- Japan
- Jordan
- Kuwait
- Malaysia
- Mongolia
- Oman
- Philippines
- Saudi Arabia
- Singapore
- South Korea
- Thailand
- Turkey
- United Arab Emirates
- Vietnam

==== Europe ====
- Austria
- Belgium
- Czechia
- Denmark
- Finland
- France
- Germany
- Hungary
- Italy
- Latvia
- Lithuania
- Luxembourg
- Netherlands
- Poland
- Russia
- Slovakia
- Spain
- Sweden
- Switzerland
- United Kingdom

==== North America ====
- Canada
- Mexico
- United States

==== Oceania ====
- Australia
- New Zealand
- Papua New Guinea

==== South America ====
- Argentina
- Brazil
- Chile
- Colombia
- Ecuador
- Peru

=== Multilateral organization in Taiwan ===
- European Union Taiwan Office – European Economic and Trade Office

== Free trade agreements ==
- Guatemala – July 2005
- Paraguay – February 2018
- Eswatini – June 2018

== International organizations ==
Prior to 1971, the flag of the Republic of China was used by the ROC government to represent the Chinese state on the international stage

Flag of Chinese Taipei in the official Olympic Games

Chinese Taipei Deaflympic flag

Chinese Taipei Paralympic flag

Chinese Taipei Universiade flag

Taiwan (officially the Republic of China) participates in a number of international organizations. Under pressure from the People's Republic of China (PRC, commonly known as "China"), the ROC has been excluded from, or downgraded in, many international organizations. In other cases, Taiwan may retain full participation, either as Taiwan, the Republic of China, or due to the usage of names such as "Chinese Taipei."

== International agreements ==
ROC is a party to major international treaties, including:

- Article 33 of United Nations Charter.
- Treaty of Commerce and Navigation with United States of America.
- Metre Convention (associate as "Chinese Taipei")
- Economic Cooperation Framework Agreement with PRC (signed between Straits Exchange Foundation and Association for Relations Across the Taiwan Straits – for ROC and PRC respectively and included the topic of direct flights, and with the improving relations between mainland China and Taiwan, Taipei Economic and Cultural Office in Hong Kong and Taipei Economic and Cultural Office in Macau was officially launched in Hong Kong and Macau, also Hong Kong Economic, Trade and Cultural Office and Macau Economic and Cultural Office was opened in Taiwan)

== Territorial disputes ==
The ROC claims islands in the South China Sea on the same basis as its claim to historical Chinese territory retaining the borders dated prior to the establishment of the PRC including Tibet and Outer Mongolia. Unlike its claims on the Asian mainland, however, the ROC actively pursues and defends some of its claims to these islands. These include all of the Spratly Islands, the Paracel Islands, Macclesfield Bank and Scarborough Shoal. These islands are administered by a number of governments around the South China Sea. The ROC also claims the Senkaku Islands, which are administered by Japan. Because ASEAN and the People's Republic of China did not invite the Republic of China to participate in the "Declaration on the Conduct of Parties in the South China Sea", the Republic of China did not recognize it.

The PRC, in turn, asserts itself as the sole legitimate government of China, and claims all territories administered by the ROC.

== Specialized diplomacy ==
=== Culinary diplomacy ===
Taiwan emphasizes its night markets and the high rate of vegan eateries among other aspects of its culinary culture in an effort to promote the nation through culinary diplomacy. Taiwan has used its culinary programs to bolster its tourism sector and to conduct diplomacy in countries with which it has limited official ties.

In 2010, Taiwan launched a £20m culinary diplomacy campaign.

Freedom pineapples (Chinese: 自由鳳梨; pinyin: Zìyóu fènglí) was a political and social response in 2021 to a Chinese ban on the import of pineapples from Taiwan. It encouraged domestic and international consumption to replace the loss of the mainland Chinese market, which had formerly imported 97% of all Taiwanese pineapple exports.

In 2025 after China cut off imports of Japanese seafood in response to comments from Japan's PM in support of Taiwan Lai Ching-te, the Taiwanese President, publicized his consumption of Japanese seafood. This choice was seen as diplomatically significant.

=== Medical diplomacy ===
Taiwan's medical diplomacy began in 1961 with a team of medical professionals sent to Libya. In 2018 Taiwan set up a 2 million dollar healthcare fund for its Pacific island nation allies. Taiwan officially refers to most of its medical diplomacy as public health diplomacy.

Medical diplomacy has formed a key part of Taiwan's outreach to regional countries, especially in Southeast Asia. It is one of the five key components of the New Southbound Policy. Unlike medical diplomacy under previous programs under the NSP medical diplomacy is not focused on providing direct medical care or basic public health programs but on providing high-level professional skill transfers.

==== Epidemic prevention diplomacy ====
Local media has referred to Taiwan's medical diplomacy related to the COVID-19 pandemic as "epidemic prevention diplomacy". In March 2020 Australia and Taiwan agreed to exchange 1 million liters of Australian alcohol to be used in making hand sanitizer for 3 metric tons of Taiwanese nonwoven fabric to be used in making facial masks.

=== Drone diplomacy ===
In 2025 the Ministry of Foreign Affairs launched a drone diplomacy program with the intent of supplying uncrewed vehicles to diplomatic allies, regional partners, and those facing Russian aggression especially in Europe. The effort would be facilitated in partnership with the Ministry of Economic Affairs and Taiwanese domestic industry.

== Transport and communications ==
=== Air links ===
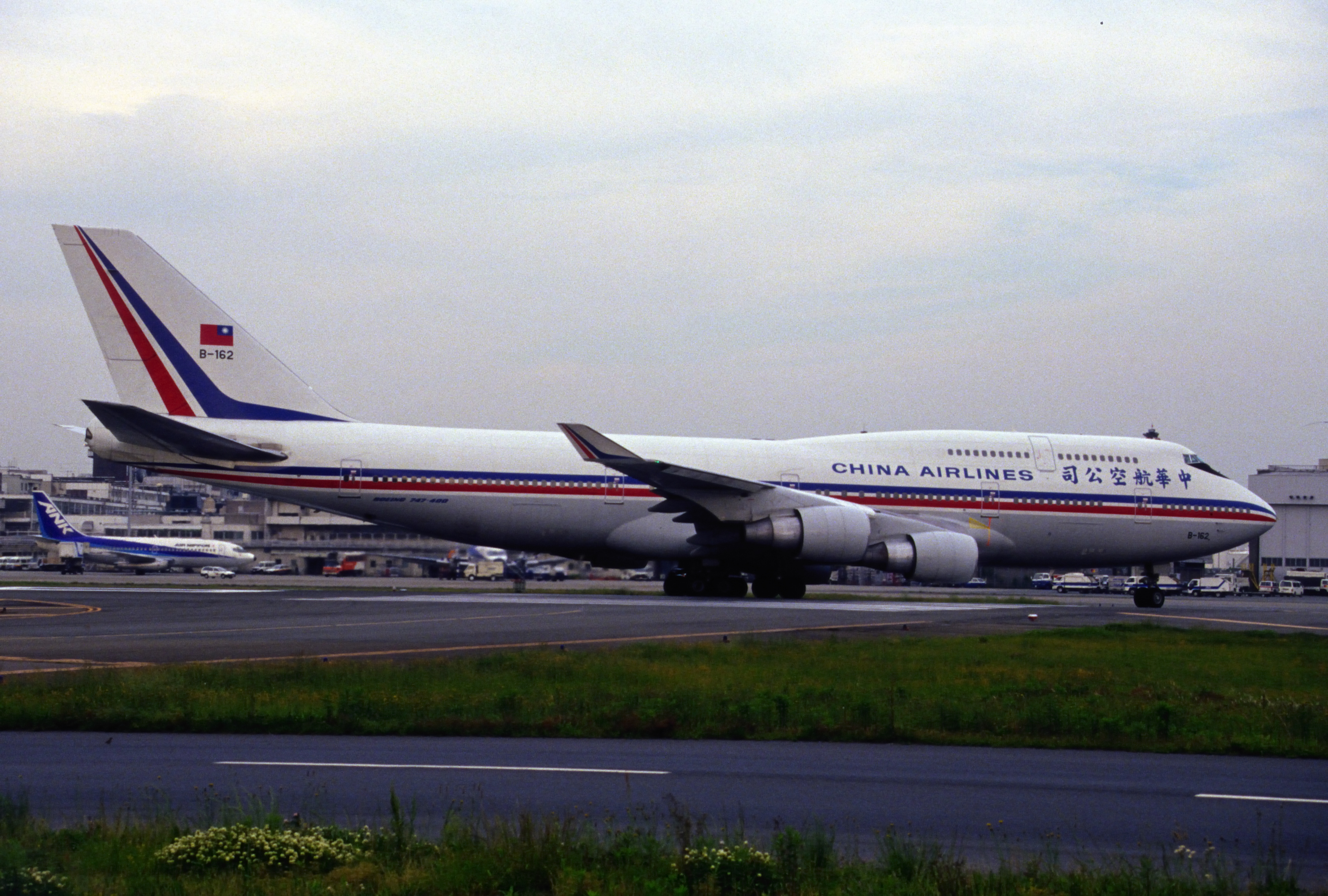
A China Airlines Boeing 747-400 in old livery, bearing the ROC flag

The dispute over Taiwan's status affects the island's air links with the outside world, particularly Europe, North America and Australia.

For many years, Mandarin Airlines, a subsidiary of Taiwan's national airline, China Airlines (CAL), served many international destinations that CAL did not because of political sensitivities. However, in 1995 CAL dropped the national colours from its livery, and now flies to international destinations under its own name. Many countries' national airlines similarly set up special subsidiaries, known as "shadow airlines", to operate services to Taipei, with a different name, and livery omitting national symbols: British Asia Airways, a British Airways subsidiary operating to London; KLM Asia, a KLM subsidiary operating to Amsterdam; Swissair Asia, a Swissair subsidiary operating to Zürich; Air France Asie, an Air France subsidiary operating to Paris; Japan Asia Airways, a Japan Air Lines subsidiary operating to Tokyo; and Australia Asia Airlines, a Qantas subsidiary operating to Sydney. Of these subsidiaries, KLM Asia is the only one that's still flying as of 2026, as the others ceased operations when their parent companies were privatized (or went bankrupt, in Swissair's case). Other countries' flag carriers, such as Germany's Lufthansa, operated flights to Taipei using an existing subsidiary (in Lufthansa's case, Condor).

Before the completion of the second runway at New Tokyo International Airport (now Narita International Airport) in Chiba, Japan, airlines from Taiwan were required to utilize Haneda International Airport for their Tokyo routes in order not to offend the airlines from the PRC that flew to Narita. All Nippon Airways, however, used an existing subsidiary, Air Nippon. With the implementation of a new Japan-Taiwan air agreement, JAL and ANA took over flight operations between Japan and Taiwan in April 2008.

Beginning July 2008, charter flights between mainland China and Taiwan, which were traditionally only allowed on special holidays such as Chinese New Year, were significantly expanded.

China has begun compelling foreign airlines with landing privileges in the mainland to identify Taiwanese destinations as if they were part of the mainland government, e.g. T'aipei CN instead of T'aipei TW.

=== Telecommunications ===
International dialling codes were assigned by the International Telecommunication Union (ITU), an agency of the United Nations, to its member states and their dependencies in the 1960s. Despite the Republic of China on Taiwan still being a member of the UN, and hence the ITU, other member states declared that "the only representatives of the people of China are the delegates to the ITU and its permanent organs appointed by the Central Government of the People's Republic of China". This led to the People's Republic of China being assigned the country code 86. Consequently, in the early 1970s, Taiwan had to be unofficially assigned a separate code, 886, although there was pressure from China to change this to 866. This had to be listed as "reserved", but in 2006, the code was formally allocated to "Taiwan, China".

Codes in the +86 6 number range have since been allocated to cities in mainland China; for example, the area code for Shanwei is 0660. Consequently, calls from mainland China to Taiwan require the international access code and country code 00886.

== See also ==
- China and the United Nations
- Foreign relations of the People's Republic of China
- Foreign relations of Hong Kong
- Foreign relations of Macau
- Freedom pineapples
- History of Cross-Strait Relations
- International rankings of Taiwan
- List of diplomatic missions of Taiwan
- Milk Tea Alliance
- Ministry of Foreign Affairs (Taiwan)
- Visa policy of Taiwan
- Wolf warrior diplomacy
