= Union for the Local Employees in Missions Accredited to South Africa =

Trade union

ULEMASA
- Union for the Local Employees in Missions Accredited to South Africa
- Predecessor: Abram Namanyane Sello Pelo
- Founded: September 2018
- Founded at: Pretoria
- Dissolved: April 24, 2023; 2 years ago
- Headquarters: Pretoria, Gauteng, South Africa
- Location: South Africa
- Region served: Gauteng
- Members: 2800
- Last President: Darlington Karumbidza
- Last constitutional General Secretary: Mr Sipho Mahlangu
- Last constitutional Deputy President: Anna Boitumelo Mathebula
- Last Constitutional General Treasure: Lourdes Cruz Ortega
- Board of directors: Sekgametsi Winifred Mandhlazi, Seroba Charles Modiba, Richard Muhirhi, Skhumbuzo Owen Msibi
- Key people: Permanently Closed, president Permanently Closed, general secretary
- Subsidiaries: Department of Employment and Labour
- Affiliations: WFTU
- Budget: $533.47 m CAD
- Staff: 1 FTEs
- Website: www.ulemasa.org.za
- Remarks: The Union for Local Employees in Missions Accredited to South Africa was, however, a key source of support against the impunities that diplomatic missions in South Africa were committing. This was in the absence of support from local organizations fighting against human rights violations.

Union for the Local Employees in Missions Accredited to South Africa (ULEMASA) is a trade union formed by local employees working for diplomatic missions in South Africa.

== History ==
According to the article published by diplomatic Society Newspaper, on 9 June 2018, workers in the Diplomatic sector met at the Union Buildings for talks on forming a trade union for all of the local South African and migrant workers recruited by the foreign missions, such as Embassies and International Organizations in South Africa, which followed talks between the representatives and the former Minister of the Department of International Relations and Cooperation (DIRCO) Lindiwe Sisulu and the Department of Labour in the capital district Tshwane, Pretoria.

Several resolutions were passed at the first meeting, namely:

- To focus on exploitation of (mostly women) workers in the Embassies, High Commissions, Consulates and international organizations in South Africa
- To demand fair recruitment process and labour law practices
- To force foreign missions in South Africa to abide by local labour laws and any other applicable laws
- To demand minimum wage and equal opportunities for all workers regardless of race or origin
- To force the Department of International Relations & Cooperation (DIRCO) to remind and advise embassy employees including Ambassadors, other representatives and their families in the accredited missions who enjoy diplomatic immunity and inviolability, on their duty to respect the laws and regulations of South Africa
- To extend the demand to all foreign missions to respect the Vienna Convention on Diplomatic Relations of 1961

After successful talks on 18 July 2018, the Department of Labour formally registered ULEMASA. Mr Abram Namanyane Sello Pelo, was the first President, Mr Sipho Maphalala, Deputy President and Mr Muhirhi Richard Ngekama was the first Elected General Secretary of the Organization.

=== Affiliation ===
ULEMASA came to a decision in September 2018 after the 13th National Congress of Congress of South African Trade Unions (COSATU) to affiliate with World Federation of Trade Unions.

=== Recognition ===
On 25 September 2018 The Department of International Relations and Cooperation sent official notification to all the heads of foreign states in the Republic notifying them of the registration of ULEMASA.

=== Third Democratic Elections ===
As a result of the National Congress, held in Pretoria (Tshwane) on 27 February 2021, Mr. Darlington Karumbiza, elected as the third president of ULEMASA, later resigned from the Union Affairs along with the General Secretary, Sipho Mahlangu.

== Fight Against Violation of Human Rights and Unfair Labour Practices ==
- ULEMASA held a picket against Libyan embassy officials in Pretoria for forcing embassy workers to undergo HIV tests in August 2020.
- Picket against Algerian Ambassador Abd-El-Naceur Belaid in a case of sexual harassment.
- Picket at the United Arab Emirates Embassy in Pretoria on charges of discrimination against local employees.

== Deregistration of ULEMASA ==
The Department of Labour cancelled ULEMASA's registration (LR2/6/2/2742)

The Registrar of Labour Relations revoked the registration of ULEMASA (LR2/6/2/2742) based upon Section 109 (2) read with Section 106 (2A) of the Labour Relations Act, 1995. The organization has been removed from the South African Register of Trade Unions under the leadership of Charles Seroba Modiba as its General Secretary.

Locally recruited personnel employed at Missions will now be required to follow the protocols and procedures in Part 5 of the Policy on the Management of Diplomatic Immunities and Privileges. This information is available on the DIRCO website, www.dirco.gov.za. For the enforcement of Arbitration Awards, refer to Part 4, paragraphs 4.2.3 to 4.2.9.

Missions have been requested to honor the process by responding to documents from the Commission for Conciliation, Mediation and Arbitration (CCMA) transmitted via DIRCO and encouraged to attend meetings scheduled by the CCMA.

== External ==
- Official Site
