= Taipei Liaison Office, Cape Town =

Taipei Liaison Office in Cape Town 駐開普敦台北聯絡辦事處
Agency overview
- Formed: 1998
- Jurisdiction: South Africa (provinces of Western Cape, Northern Cape and Eastern Cape); Namibia
- Headquarters: Cape Town
- Agency executive: Ying-li Chen, Director General
- Website: Taipei Liaison Office in Cape Town

The Taipei Liaison Office in Cape Town (Chinese: 駐開普敦台北聯絡辦事處; pinyin: Zhù Kāi Pǔ Dūn Táiběi Liánluò Dàibiǎo Chù) represents the interests of Taiwan in South Africa in the absence of formal diplomatic relations, functioning as a de facto consulate. Its counterpart in Taiwan is the Liaison Office of the Republic of South Africa in Taipei.

The Office is headed by a Representative, currently Ying-li Chen.

The Office has responsibility for the provinces of Western Cape, Northern Cape and Eastern Cape, as well as Namibia.

The Office was formerly the Consulate-General of the Republic of China. However, when South Africa recognised the People's Republic of China, its diplomatic relations with Taiwan were terminated. This led to the establishment of the Office in 1998.

There is also a Taipei Liaison Office in the Republic of South Africa located in Pretoria, which has responsibility for the rest of South Africa, as well as Mauritius, Madagascar, Seychelles, Réunion, Comoros, Kenya, Uganda, Malawi, Tanzania, Zambia, Somalia, Rwanda, Burundi, Eritrea, Angola, Zimbabwe, Botswana, Lesotho.

== See also ==
- List of diplomatic missions in South Africa
- South Africa–Taiwan relations
