= Taipei Liaison Office, Pretoria =

De facto embassy of Taiwan in South Africa

Taipei Liaison Office in the Republic of South Africa 駐南非共和國台北聯絡代表處
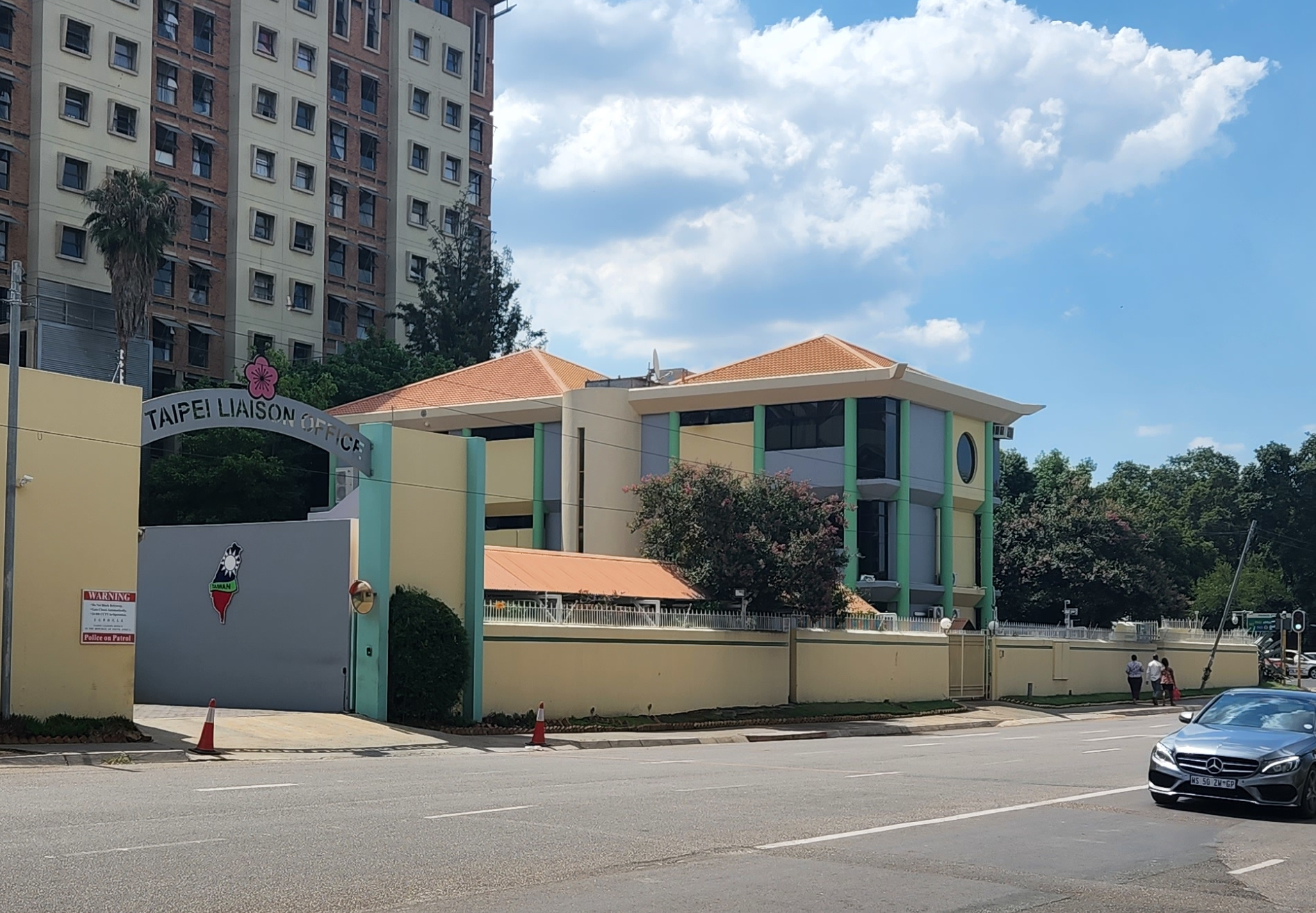

Agency overview
- Formed: 1998
- Jurisdiction: South Africa (excluding provinces of Western Cape, Northern Cape and Eastern Cape); Mauritius; Madagascar; Seychelles; Réunion; Comoros; Kenya; Uganda; Malawi; Mozambique; Tanzania; Zambia; Somalia; Rwanda; Burundi; Eritrea; Angola; Zimbabwe; Botswana; Lesotho
- Headquarters: Hatfield, Pretoria
- Agency executive: Oliver Liao, Representative
- Website: Taipei Liaison Office in the Republic of South Africa

The Taipei Liaison Office in the Republic of South Africa (Chinese: 駐南非共和國台北聯絡代表處; pinyin: Zhù Nánfēi Gònghéguó Táiběi Liánluò Dàibiǎo Chù) represents the interests of Taiwan in South Africa in the absence of formal diplomatic relations, functioning as a de facto embassy. Its counterpart in Taiwan is the Liaison Office of the Republic of South Africa in Taipei. It has two offices, one in Pretoria and the other in Cape Town.

It has responsibility for the provinces of Gauteng, Limpopo Province, North-West Province, KwaZulu-Natal, Mpumalanga and Free State.

== History ==
The Office was formerly the Embassy of the Republic of China. However, when South Africa recognised the People's Republic of China, its diplomatic relations with Taiwan were terminated. This led to the establishment of the Office in 1998.

The Office has responsibility for the interests of Taiwan in other African countries, such as Mauritius, Madagascar, Seychelles, Comoros, Kenya, Uganda, Malawi, Tanzania, Zambia, Somalia, Rwanda, Burundi, Eritrea, Angola, Zimbabwe, Botswana and Lesotho, as well as the French overseas region of Réunion.

Taiwan previously had diplomatic relations with Malawi, and was represented in the country by the Embassy of the Republic of China in Lilongwe. Lesotho, which established relations with Taipei in 1966, switched recognition to Beijing in 1983.

== Cape Town office ==
The Cape Town Office has responsibility for the provinces of Western Cape, Northern Cape and Eastern Cape as well as Namibia.

There was also previously an office in Johannesburg, formerly the Consulate-General of the Republic of China. However, owing to financial considerations and the city's proximity to Pretoria, it was closed in 2009.

A Liaison Office was also located in Durban, but has since closed. Prior to the ending of diplomatic relations, this had been a Consulate General.

== Representatives ==
- Matthew Chou (September 2017 - October 2020)
- Anthony C.Y. Ho (March 2021 -October 2022)
- Oliver Liao (November 2022 -)

== Dispute with South African government ==
In October 2024, the South African government announced plans to rebrand the Taipei Liaison Office as a trade office, along with its South African counterpart in Taipei, arguing that this was "a true reflection of the non-political and non-diplomatic nature of the relationship between the Republic of South Africa and Taiwan". South Africa's Department of International Relations and Cooperation has now categorised the Taiwan Liaison Office as a "Taipei Commercial Office" on its official website, listing it under "International organisations represented in South Africa", with its mailing address that of a now closed information office in Johannesburg instead of the present one in Pretoria. Similarly, instead of listing its email address as one under @mofa.gov.tw, the official government domain, it lists one under @telkomsa.net, that of the South African telecom operator, Telkom.

This prompted strong protests from Taiwan's Ministry of Foreign Affairs, which described the South African government's decision as "a unilateral violation of its 1997 agreement with Taiwan", and called on South Africa "to abide by the 1997 legal framework concerning bilateral relations and not employ coercive tactics against Taiwan's liaison offices or take any other actions that might interfere with their operations or services before both sides have reached a consensus through consultations."

== See also ==
- List of diplomatic missions of Taiwan
- List of diplomatic missions in South Africa
- South Africa–Taiwan relations
