= List of diplomatic missions in South Africa =

(IMS) International Mission Station

This is a list of diplomatic missions in South Africa. There are 134 embassies and high commissions in Pretoria, and many countries maintain either an embassy, high commission or consulate in Cape Town and consulates in other major cities.

Trade missions and honorary consulates are omitted from this listing.

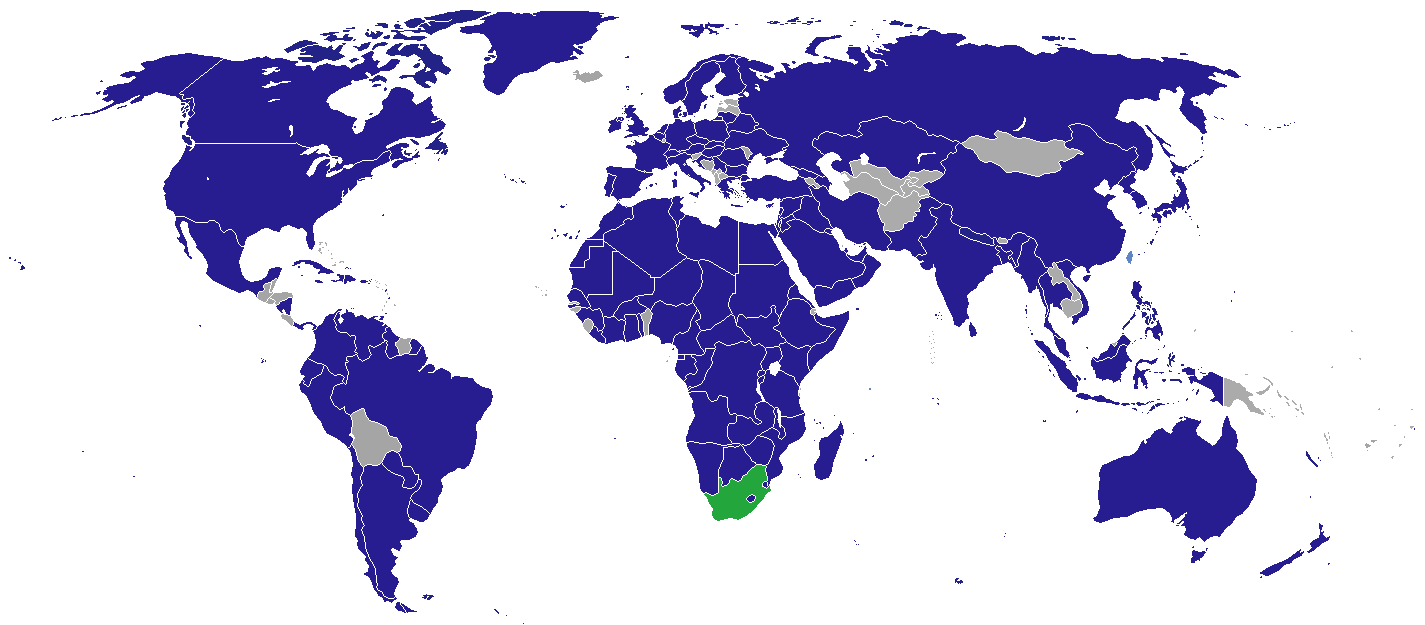
Countries with diplomatic missions in South Africa

== Diplomatic missions in Pretoria ==
=== Embassies and High Commissions ===
Entries marked with an asterisk (*) are member-states of the Commonwealth of Nations. As such, their embassies are formally termed as "high commissions".

1. Algeria
2. Angola
3. Argentina
4. Australia*
5. Austria
6. Azerbaijan
7. Bangladesh
8. Belarus
9. Belgium
10. Botswana
11. Brazil
12. Bulgaria
13. Burkina Faso
14. Burundi
15. Cameroon
16. Canada*
17. Central African Republic
18. Chad
19. Chile
20. China
21. Colombia
22. Comoros
23. Congo-Brazzaville
24. Congo-Kinshasa
25. Croatia
26. Cuba
27. Cyprus*
28. Czech Republic
29. Denmark
30. Dominican Republic
31. Ecuador
32. Egypt
33. Eswatini*
34. Equatorial Guinea
35. Eritrea
36. Ethiopia
37. Finland
38. France
39. Gabon*
40. Gambia*
41. Georgia
42. Germany
43. Ghana*
44. Greece
45. Guinea
46. Guyana*
47. Haiti
48. Holy See
49. Hungary
50. India*
51. Indonesia
52. Iran
53. Iraq
54. Ireland
55. Israel
56. Italy
57. Ivory Coast
58. Jamaica*
59. Japan
60. Jordan
61. Kazakhstan
62. Kenya*
63. Kuwait
64. Lebanon
65. Lesotho*
66. Liberia
67. Libya
68. Lithuania
69. Madagascar
70. Malawi
71. Malaysia*
72. Mali
73. Mauritania
74. Mauritius*
75. Mexico
76. Morocco
77. Mozambique*
78. Myanmar
79. Namibia*
80. Nepal
81. Netherlands
82. New Zealand*
83. Nicaragua
84. Niger
85. Nigeria*
86. North Korea
87. Norway
88. Oman
89. Pakistan*
90. Palestine
91. Panama
92. Paraguay
93. Peru
94. Philippines
95. Poland
96. Portugal
97. Qatar
98. Romania
99. Russia
100. Rwanda*
101. Sahrawi Republic
102. Saudi Arabia
103. Senegal
104. Serbia
105. Seychelles
106. Singapore*
107. Slovakia
108. Somalia
109. South Korea
110. South Sudan
111. Spain
112. Sri Lanka*
113. Sudan
114. Sweden
115. Switzerland
116. Syria
117. Tanzania*
118. Thailand
119. Timor-Leste
120. Togo*
121. Trinidad and Tobago*
122. Tunisia
123. Turkey
124. Uganda*
125. Ukraine
126. United Arab Emirates
127. United Kingdom*
128. United States
129. Uruguay
130. Venezuela
131. Vietnam
132. Yemen
133. Zambia*
134. Zimbabwe

=== Other missions or delegations ===
- European Union (Delegation)
- Republic of China (Taiwan) (Liaison Office)
- United Nations (Resident coordinator's office)

=== Gallery ===
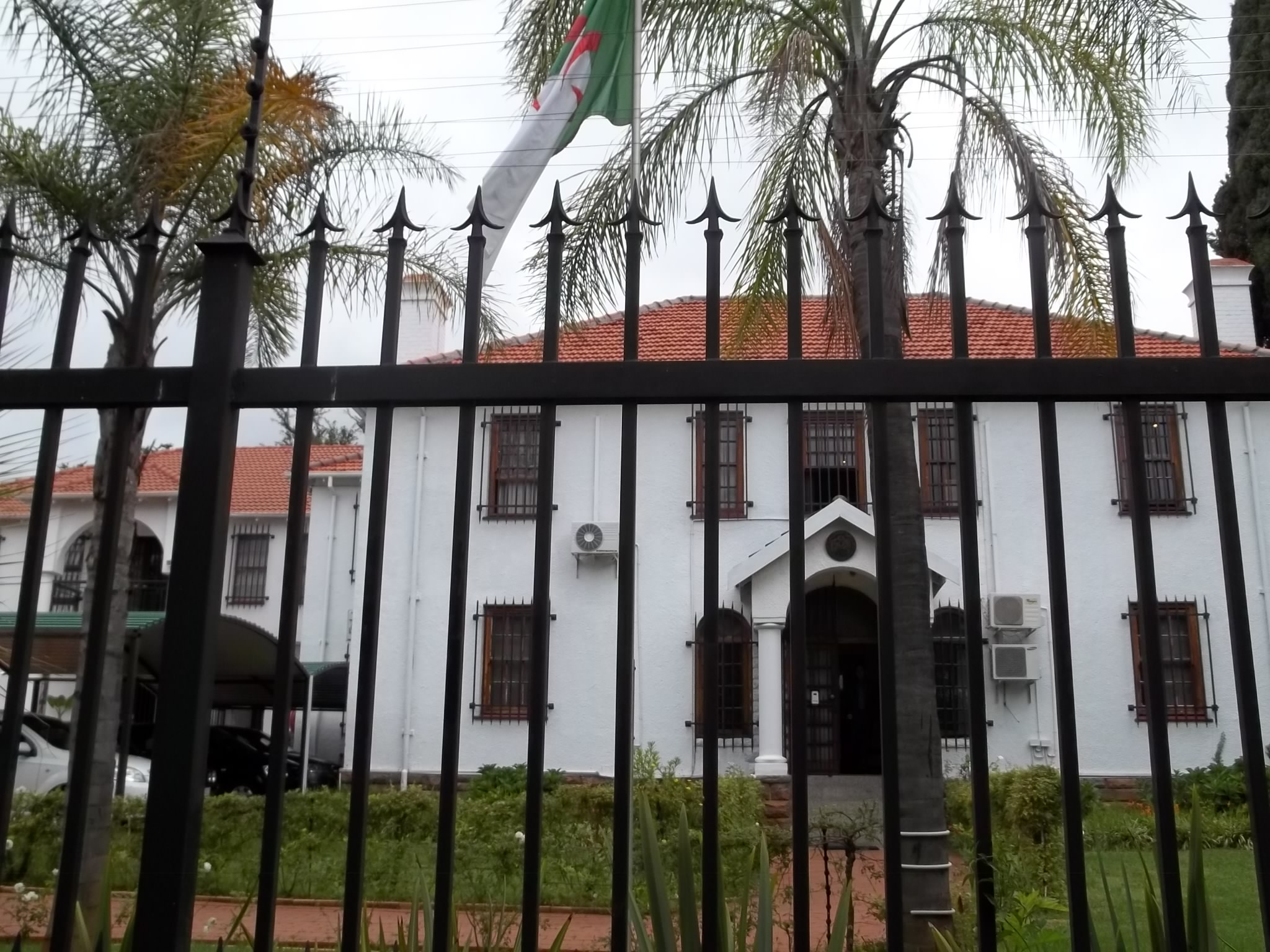
Embassy of Algeria

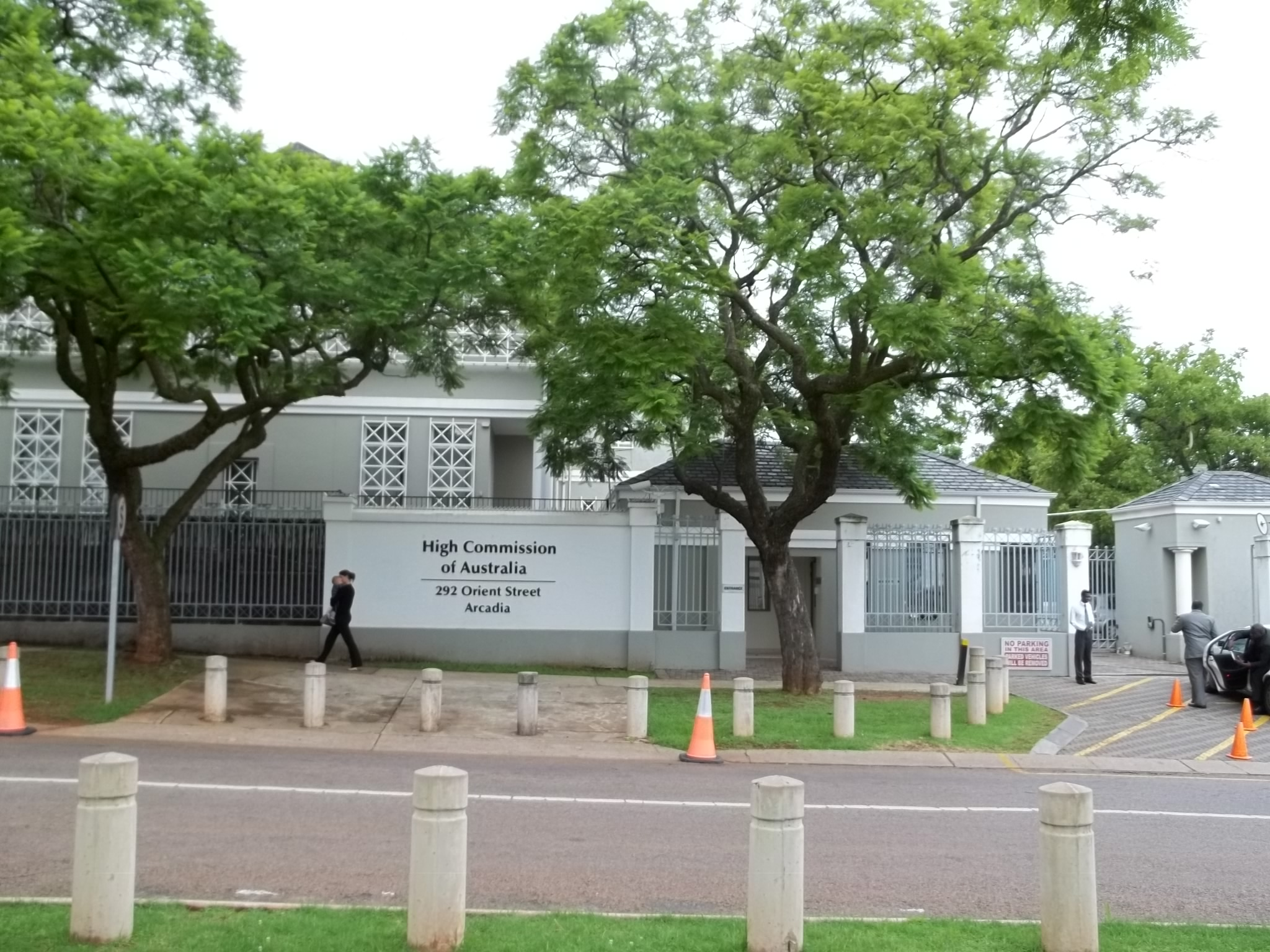
High Commission of Australia

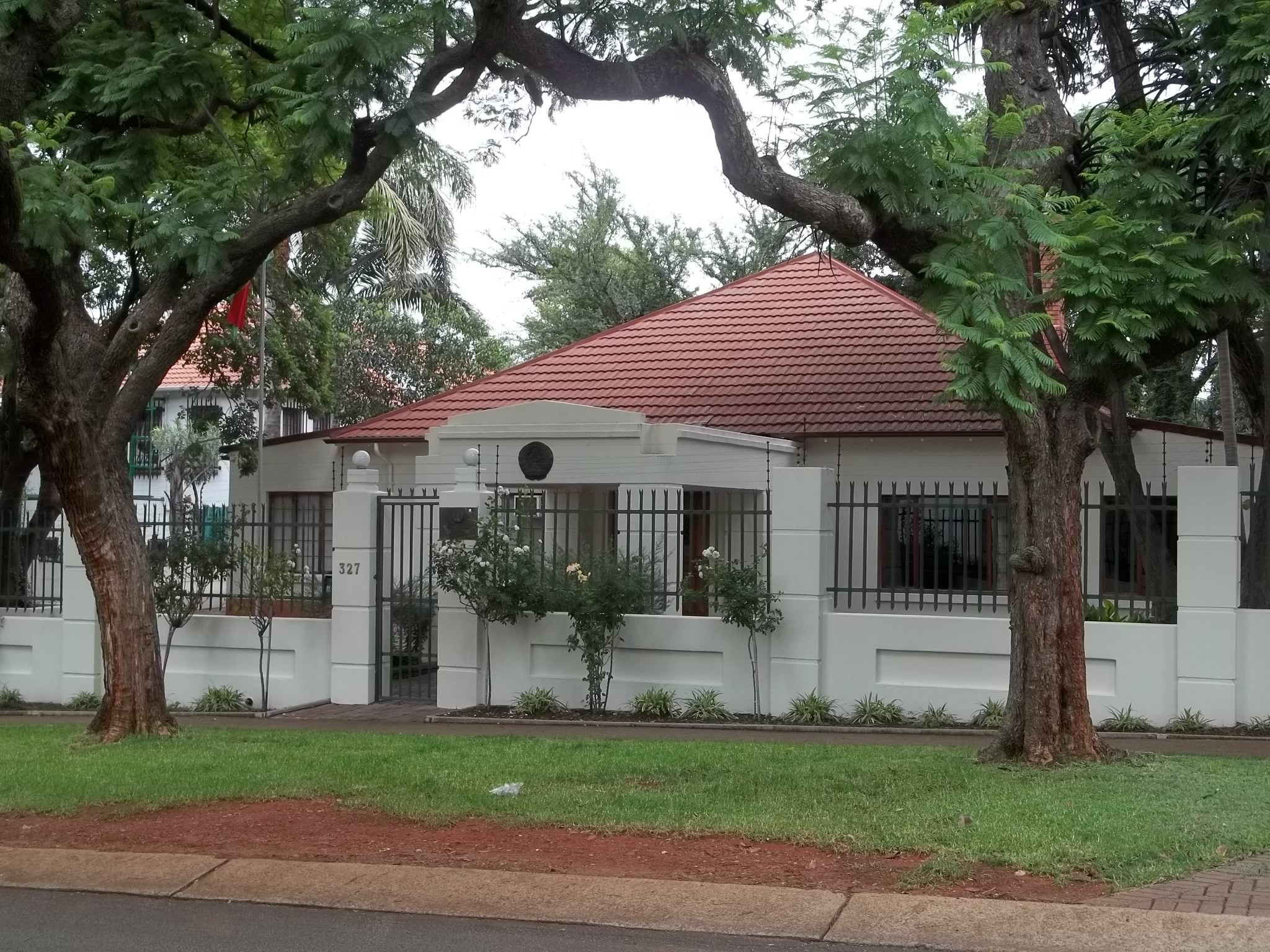
Embassy of Belarus

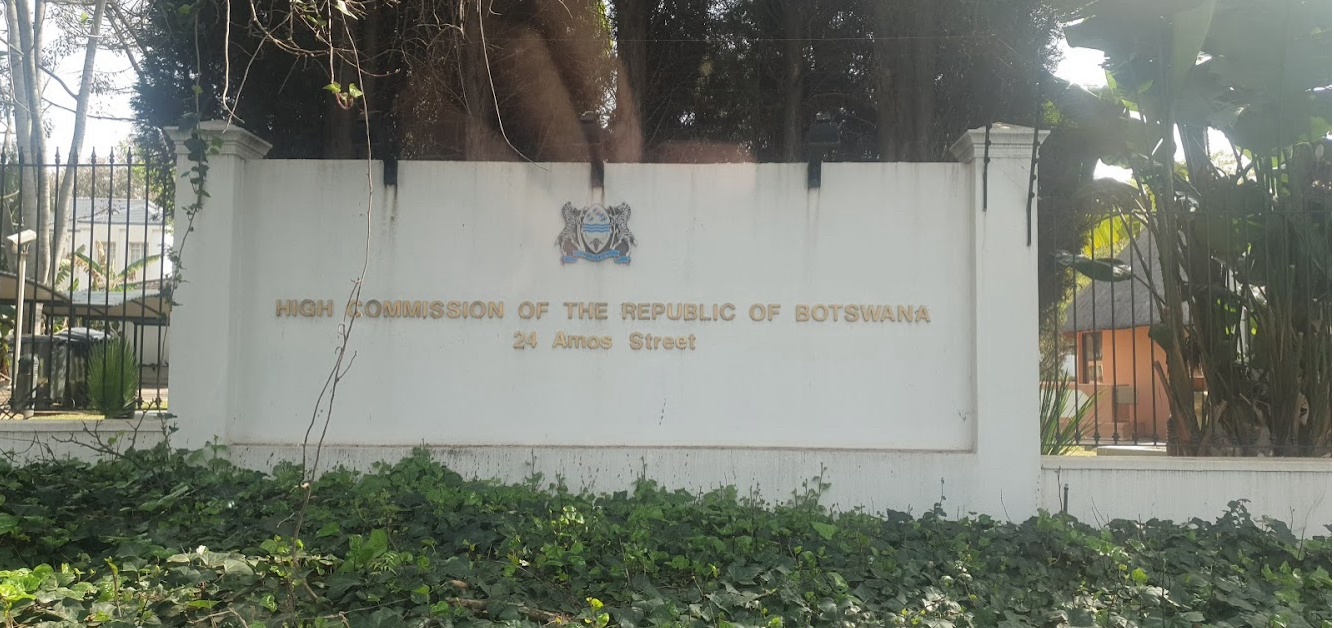
High Commission of Botswana

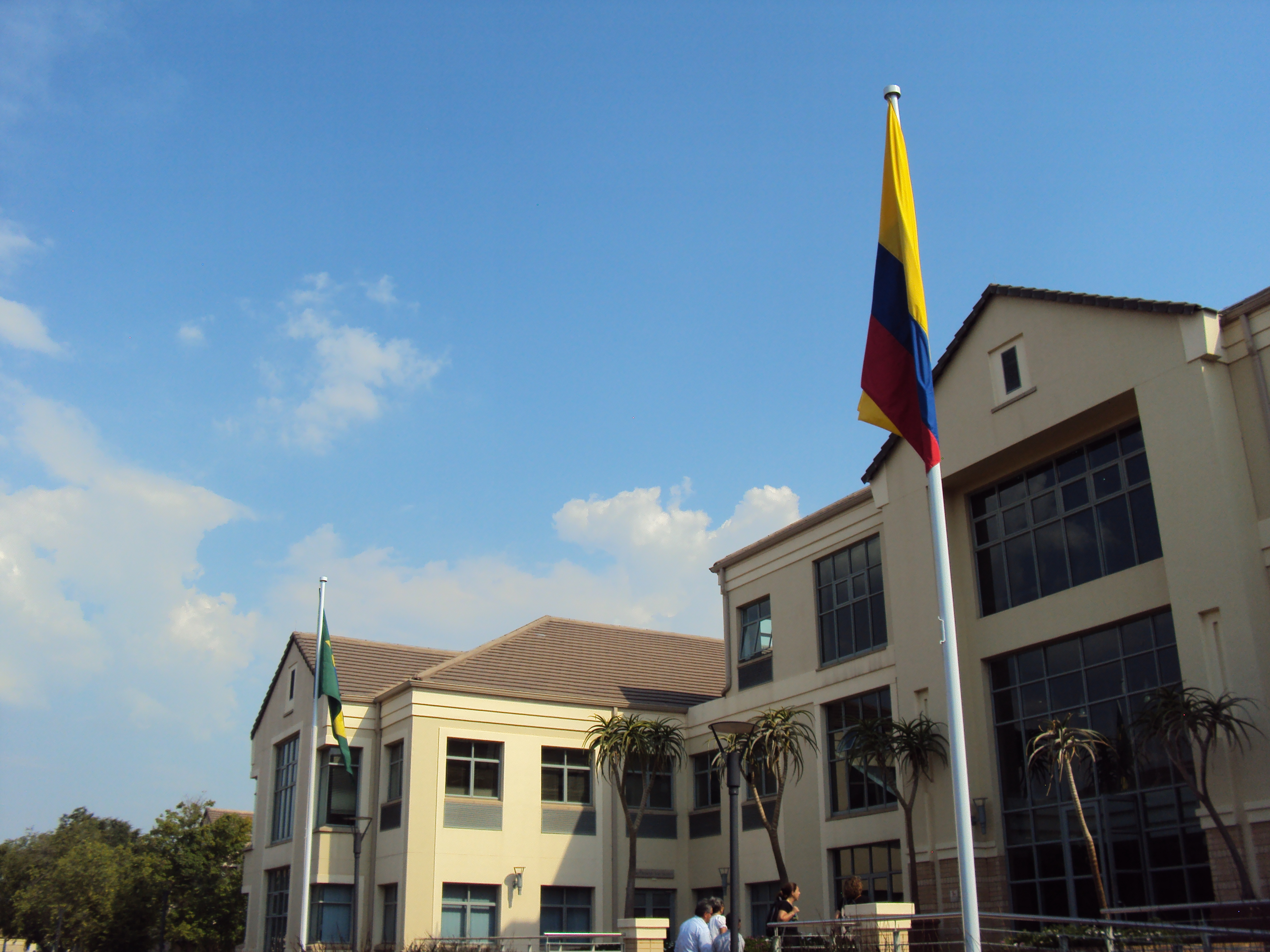
Embassies of Brazil and Colombia

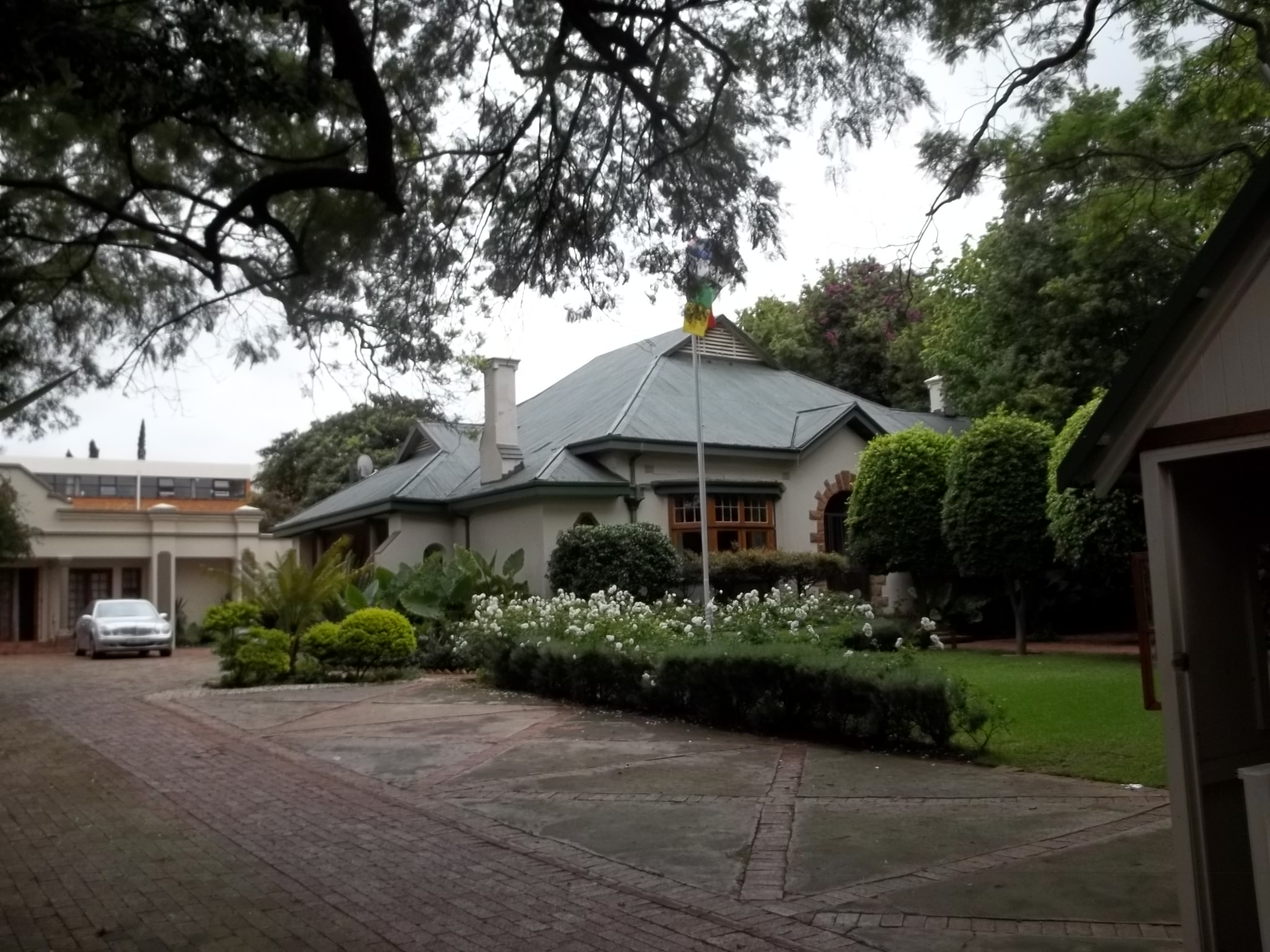
Embassy of the Central African Republic

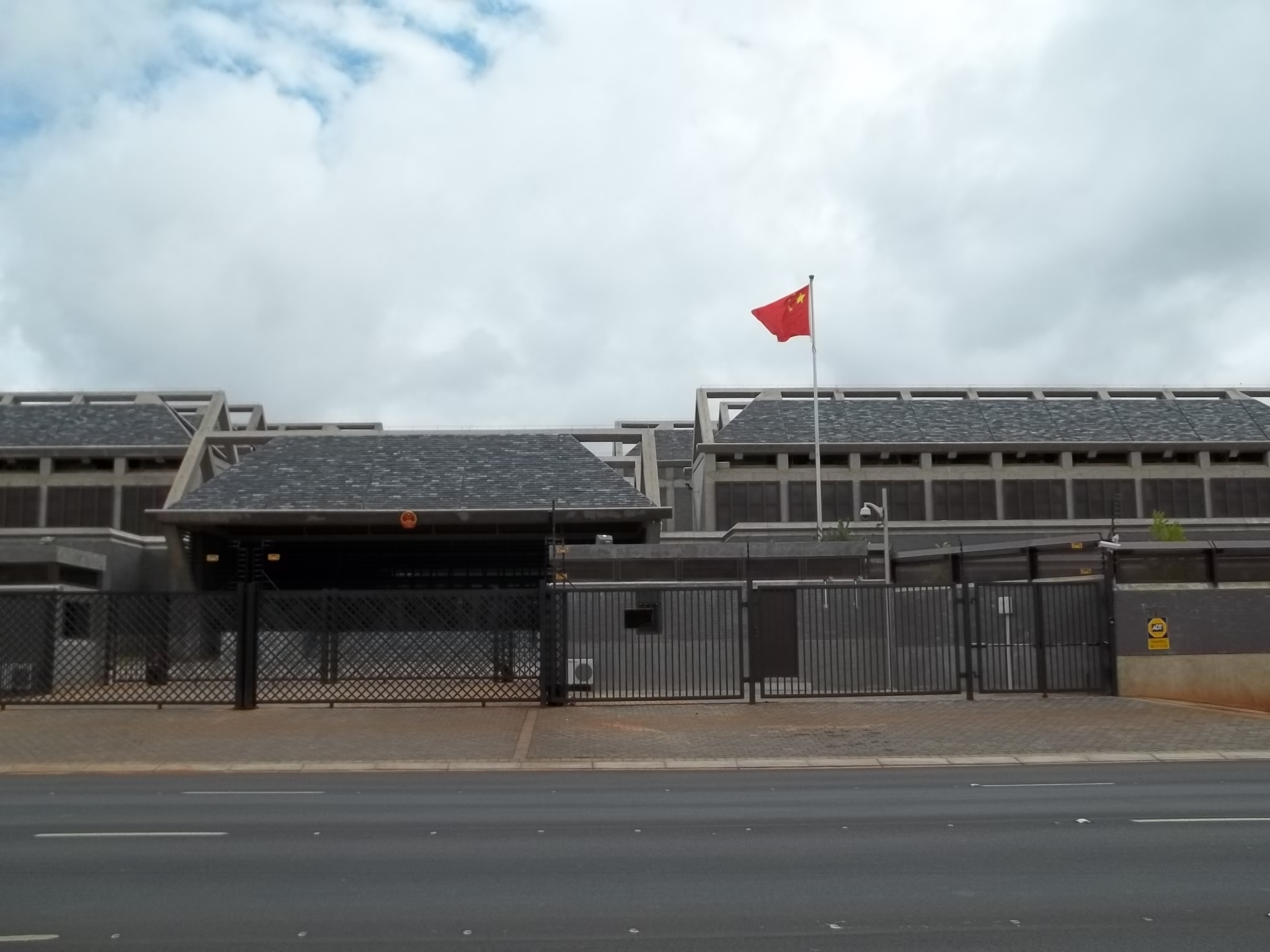
Embassy of China

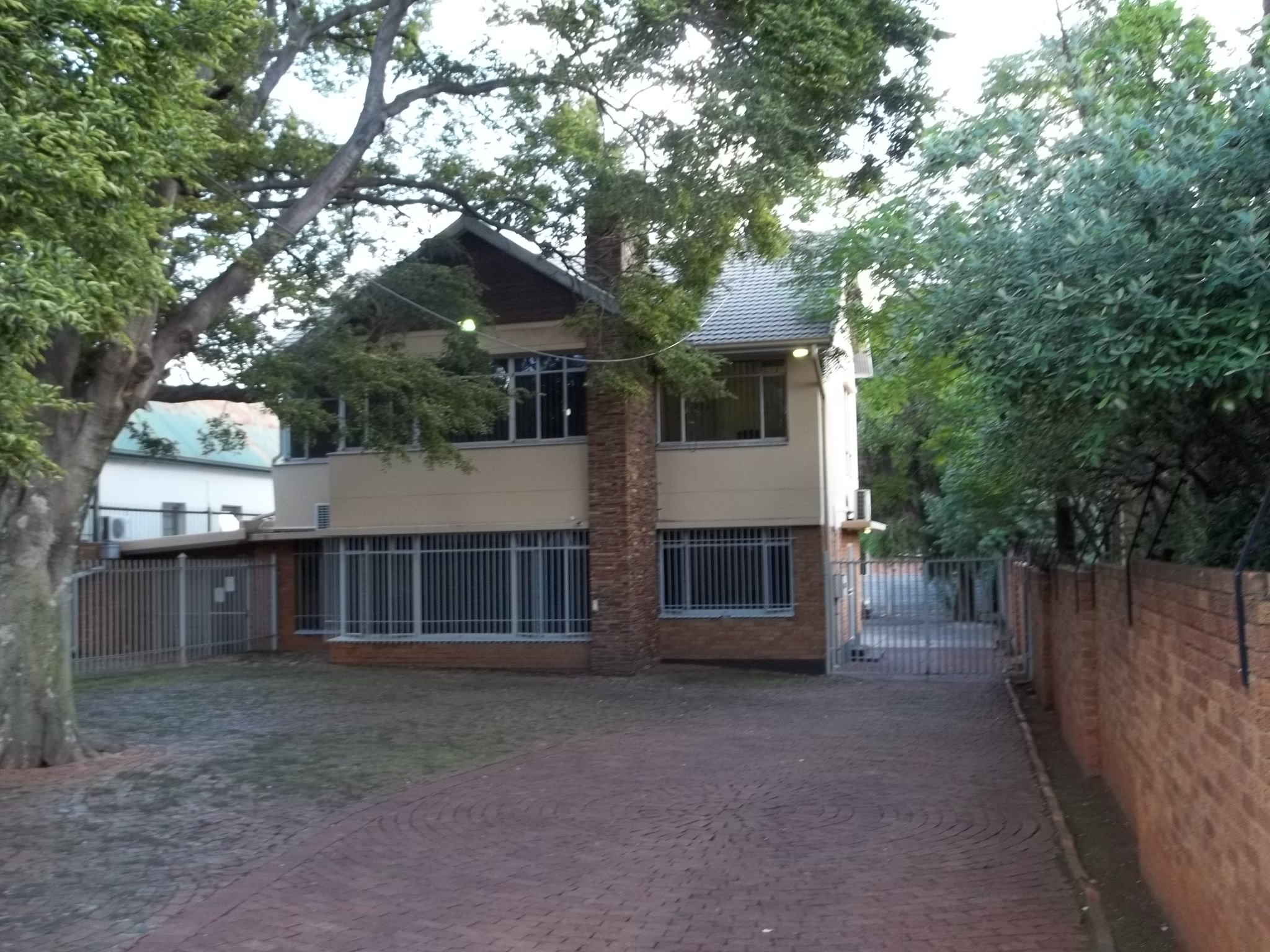
Embassy of Congo-Kinshasa

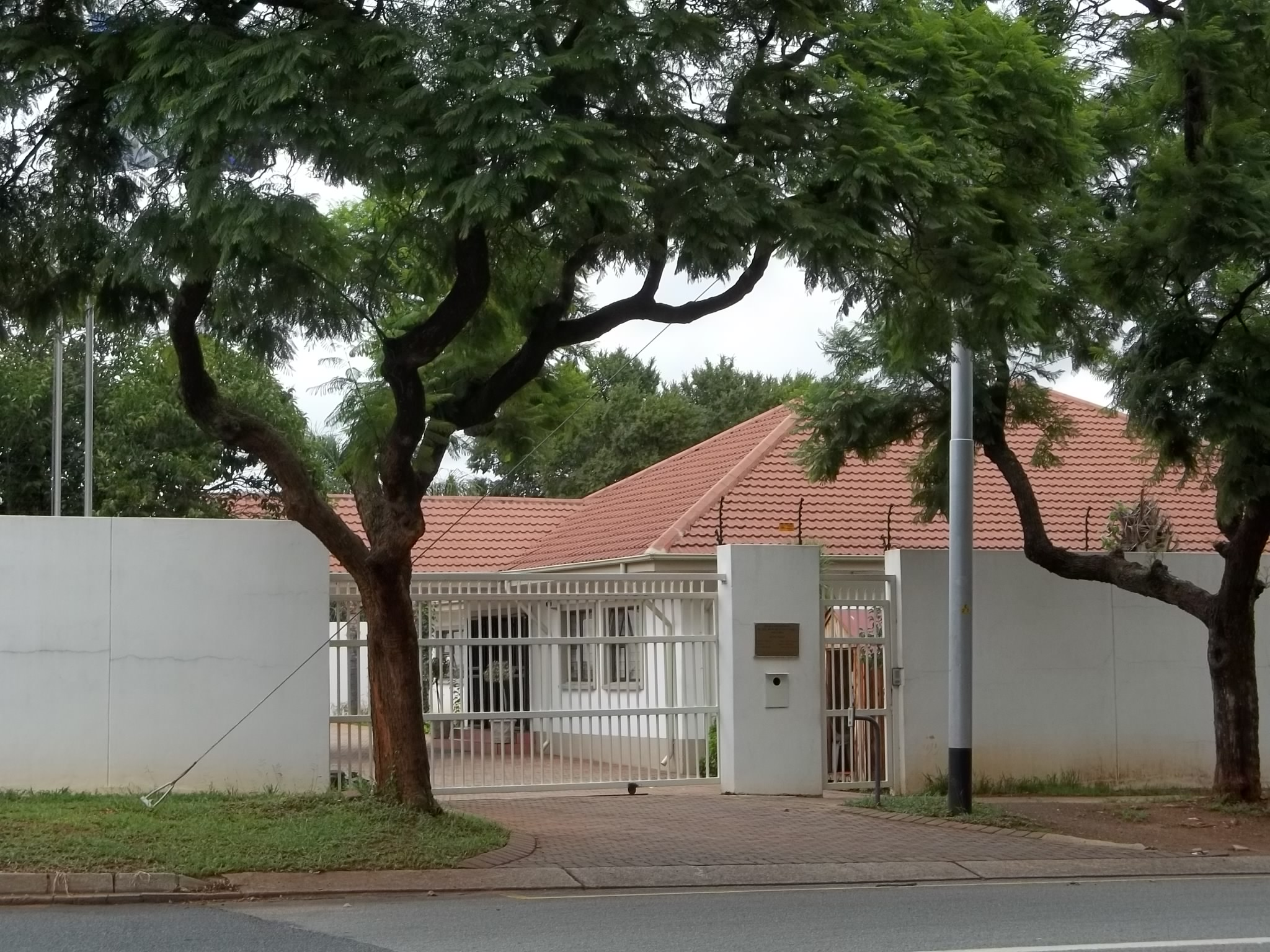
High Commission of Cyprus

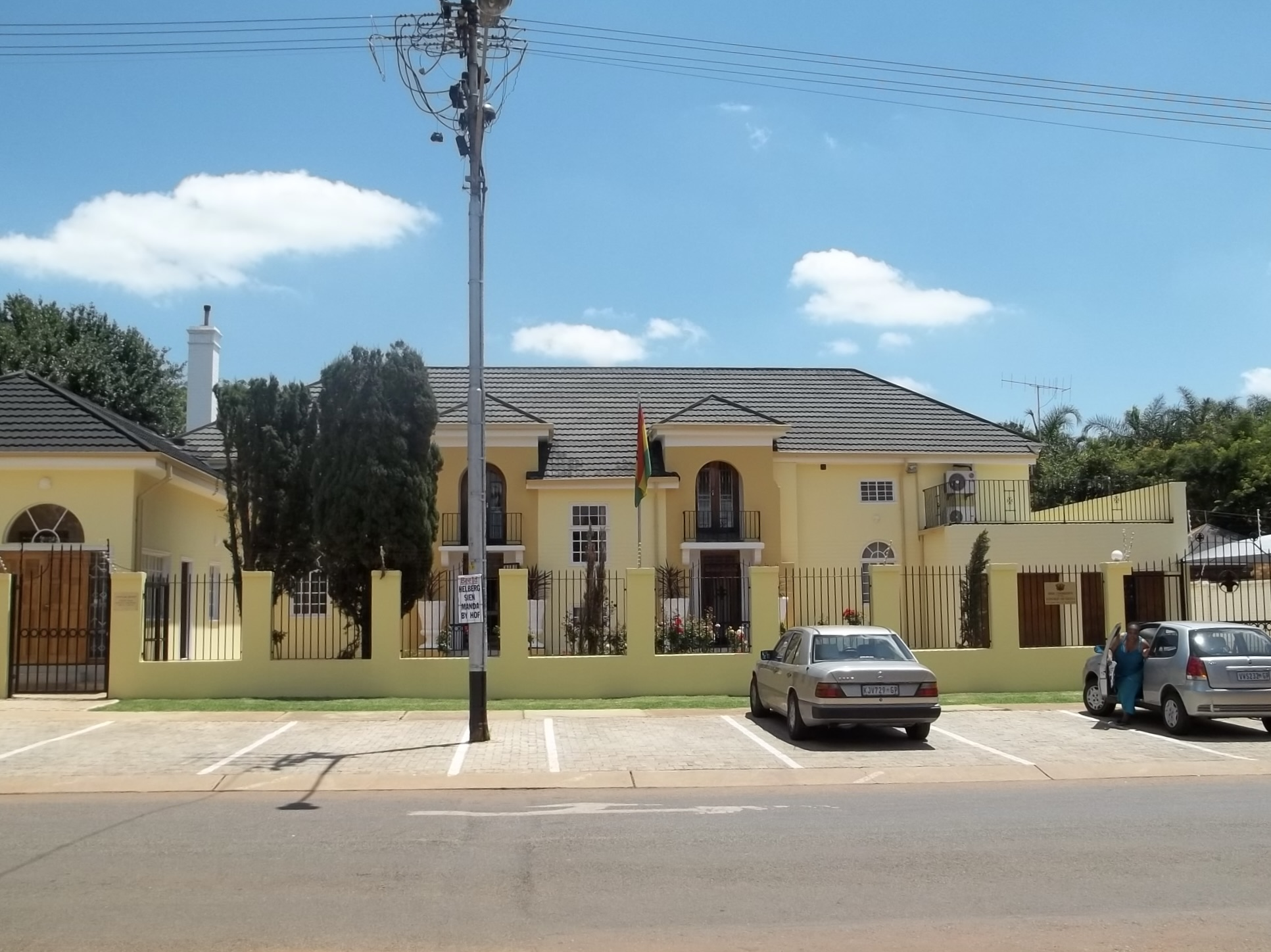
High Commission of Ghana

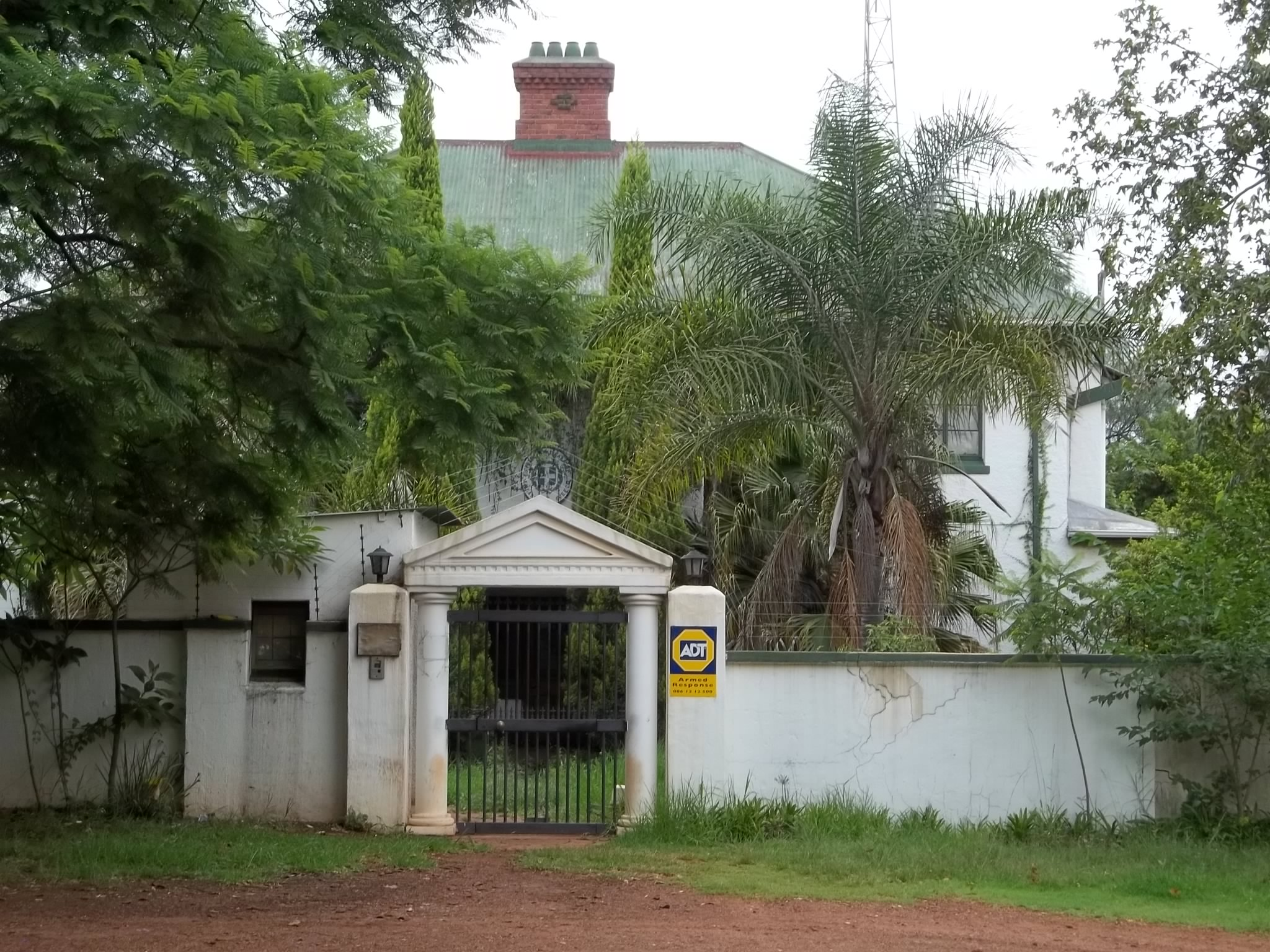
Embassy of Greece

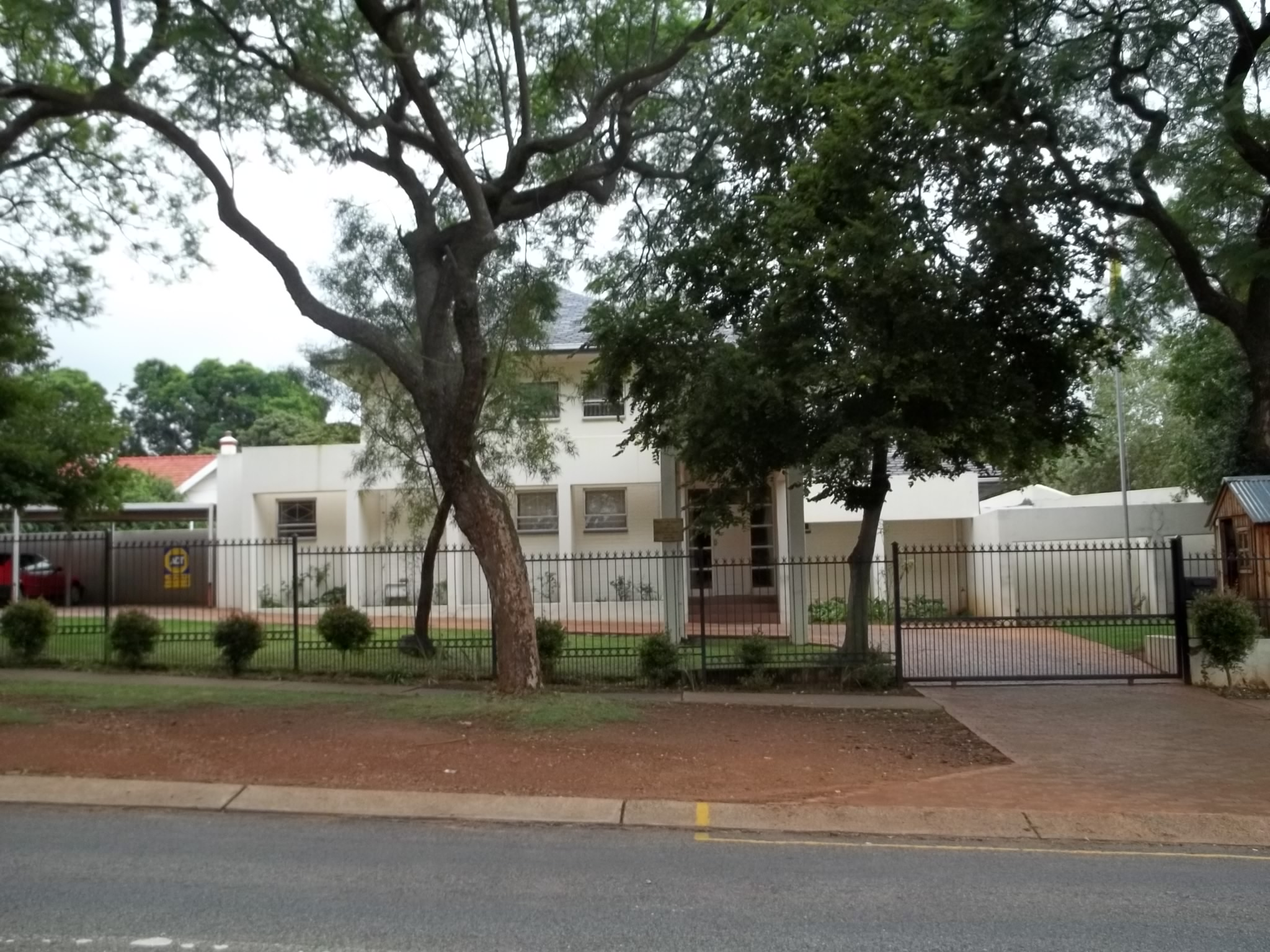
Embassy of Guinea

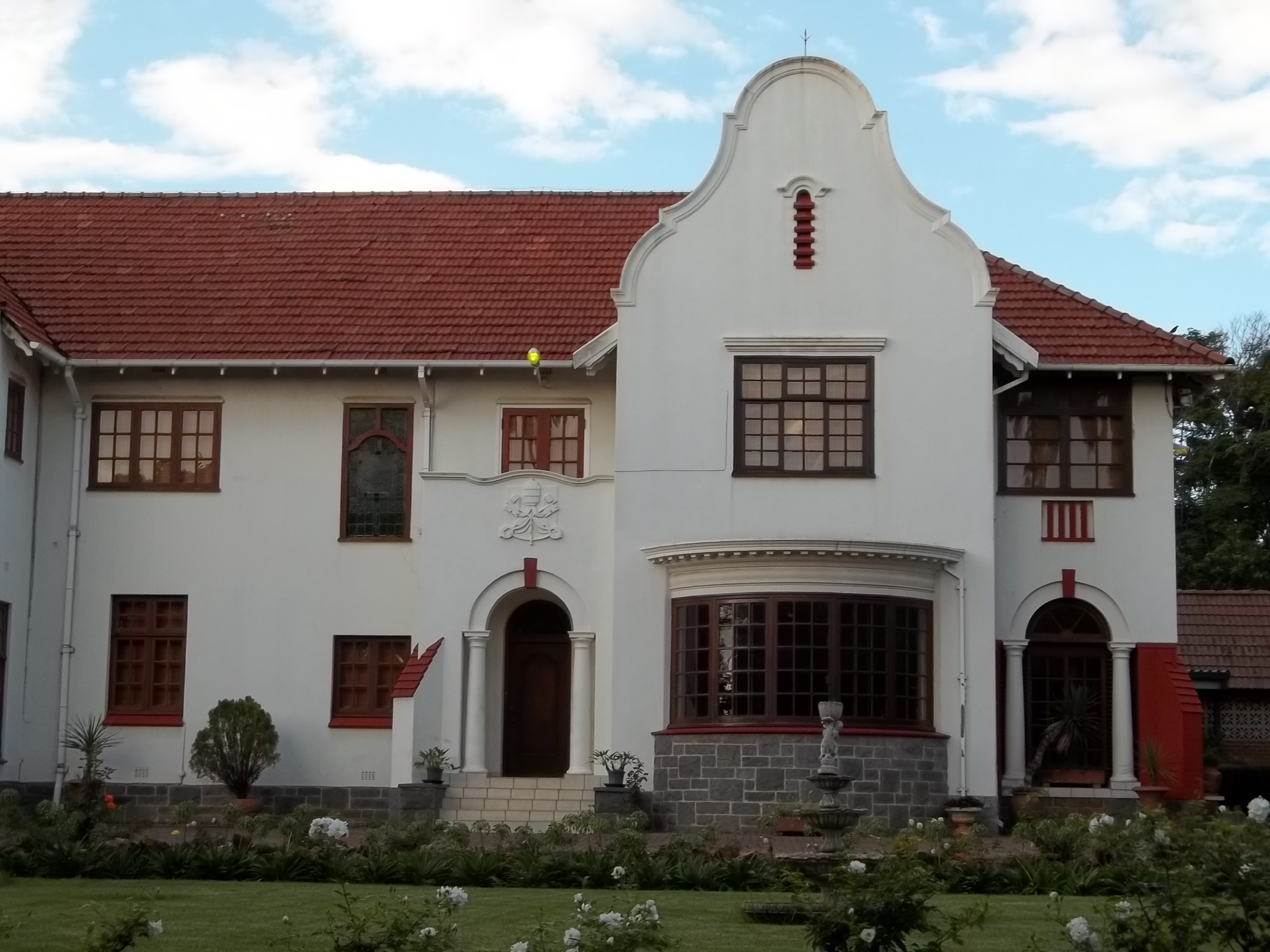
Apostolic Nunciature of the Holy See

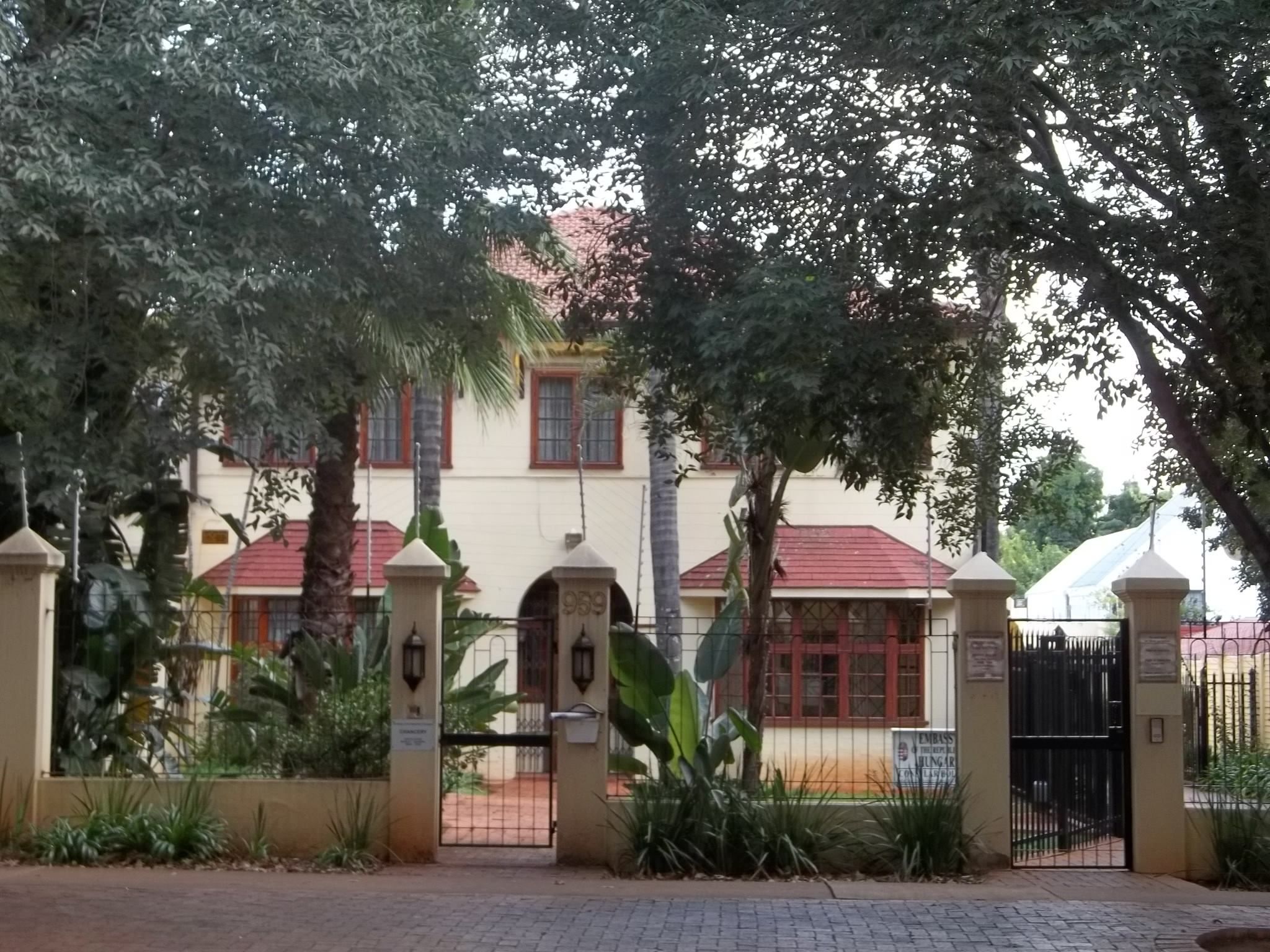
Embassy of Hungary

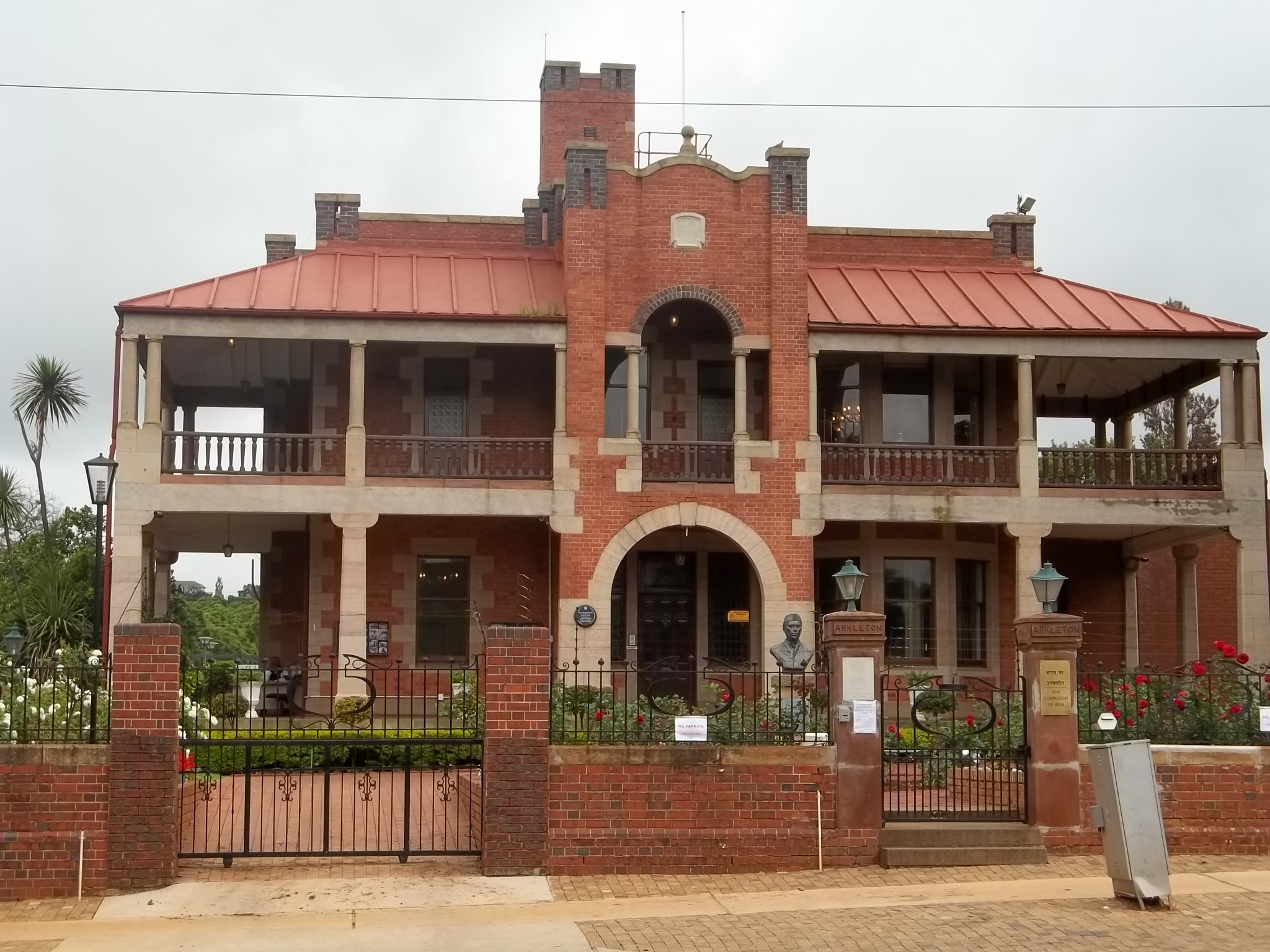
High Commission of India

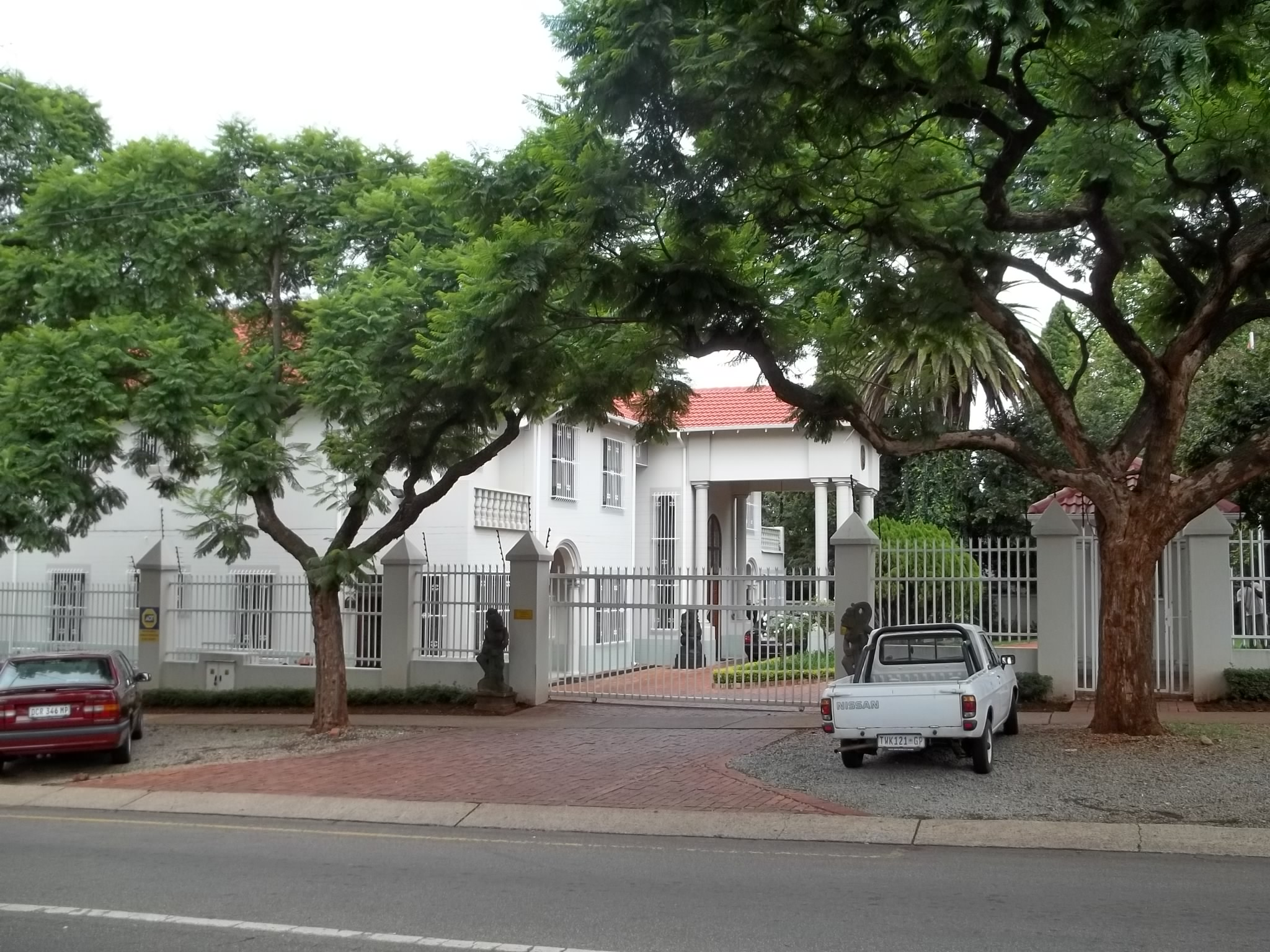
Embassy of Indonesia

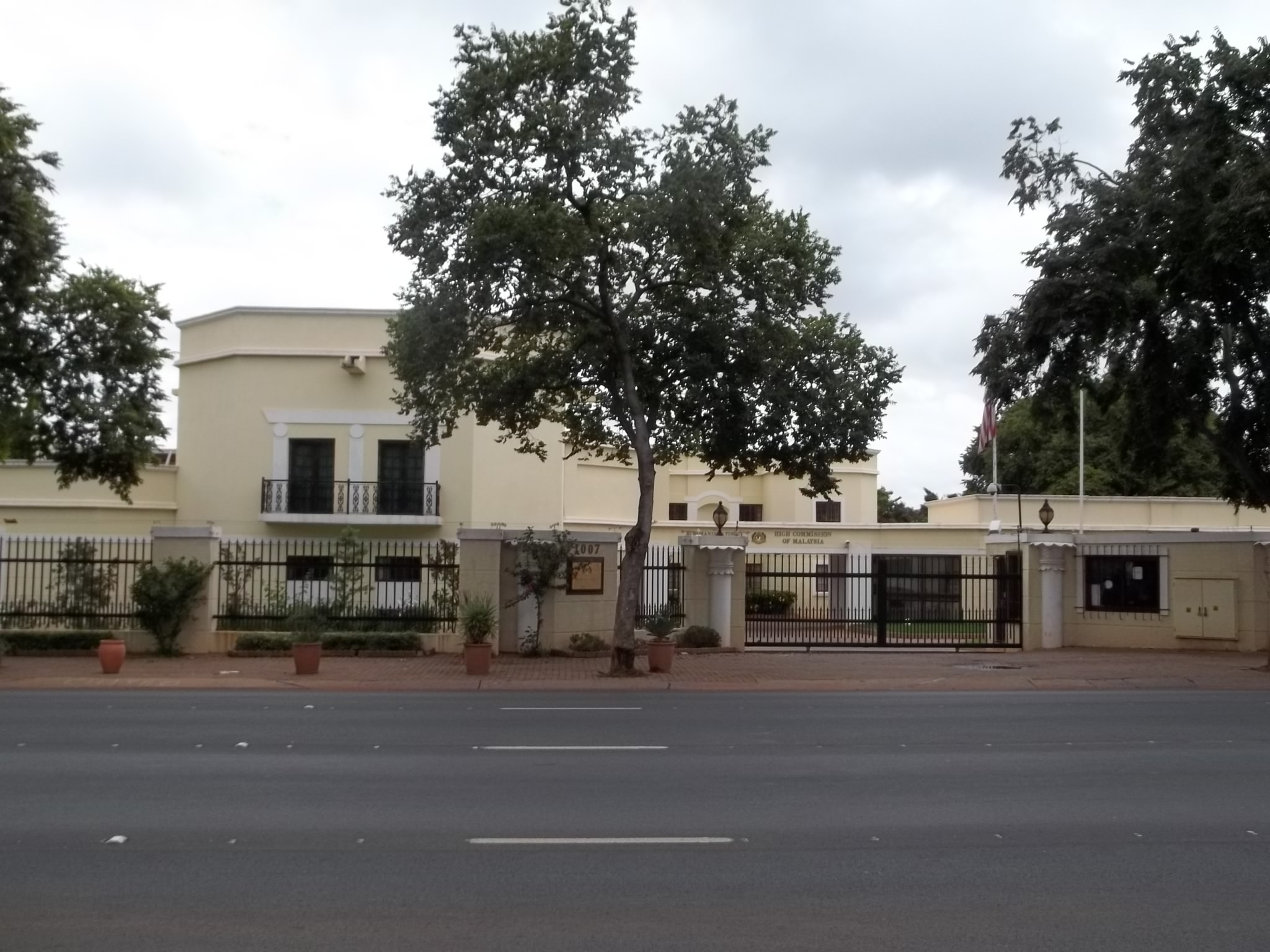
High Commission of Malaysia

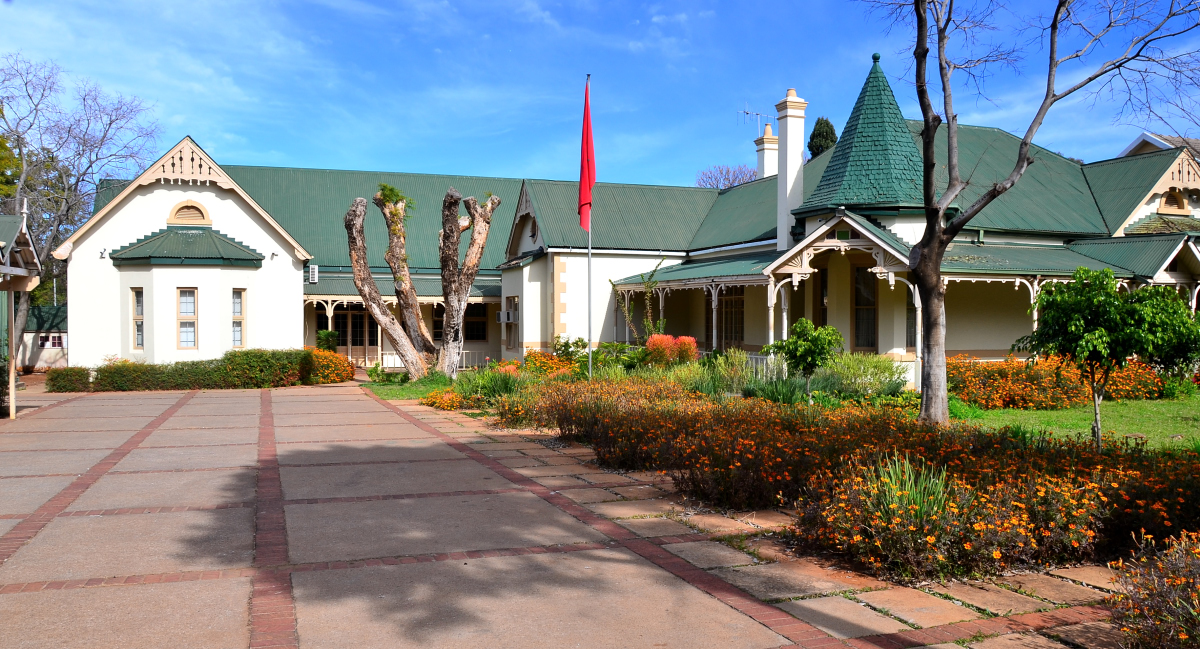
Embassy of Morocco

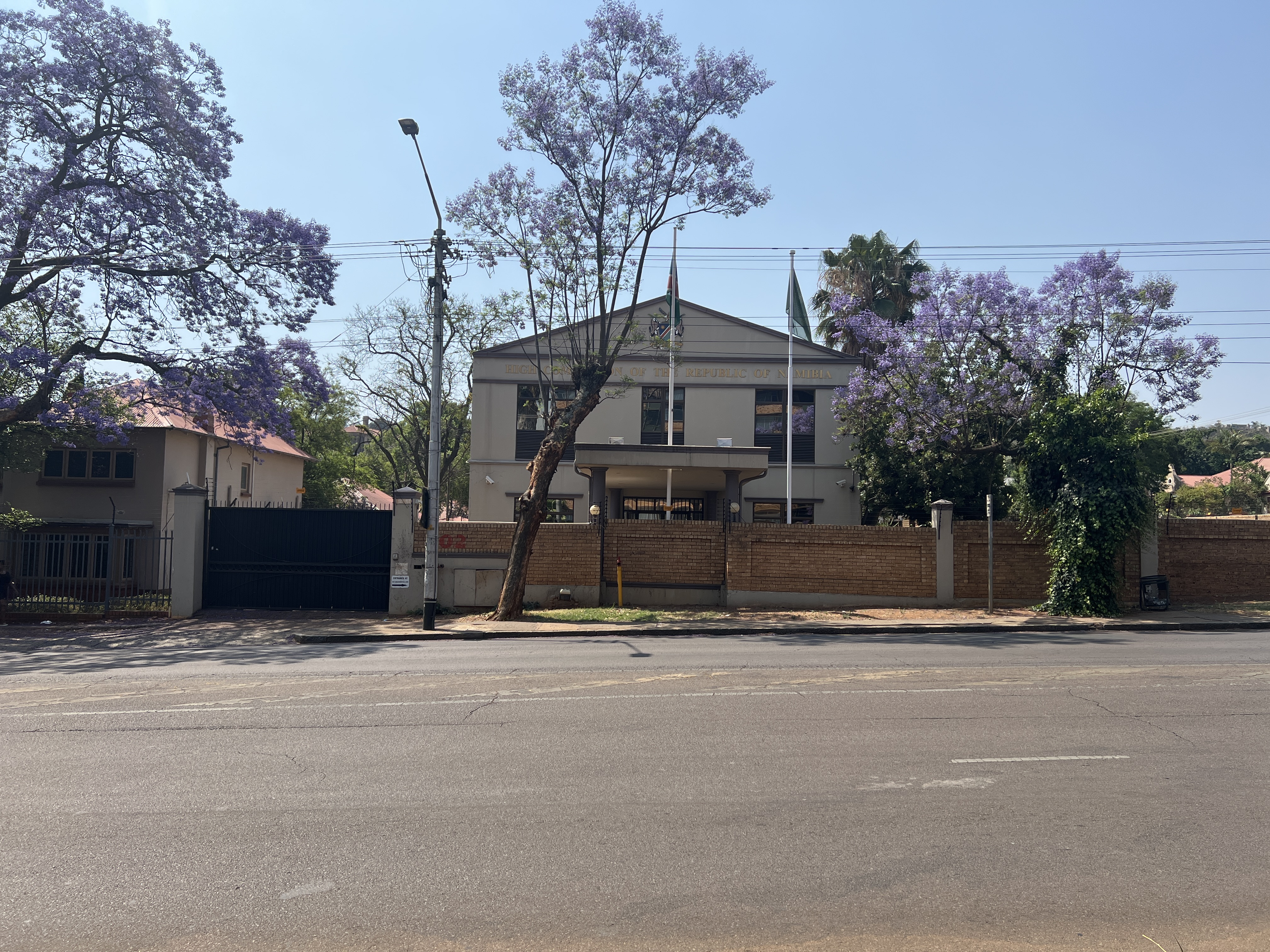
High Commission of Namibia

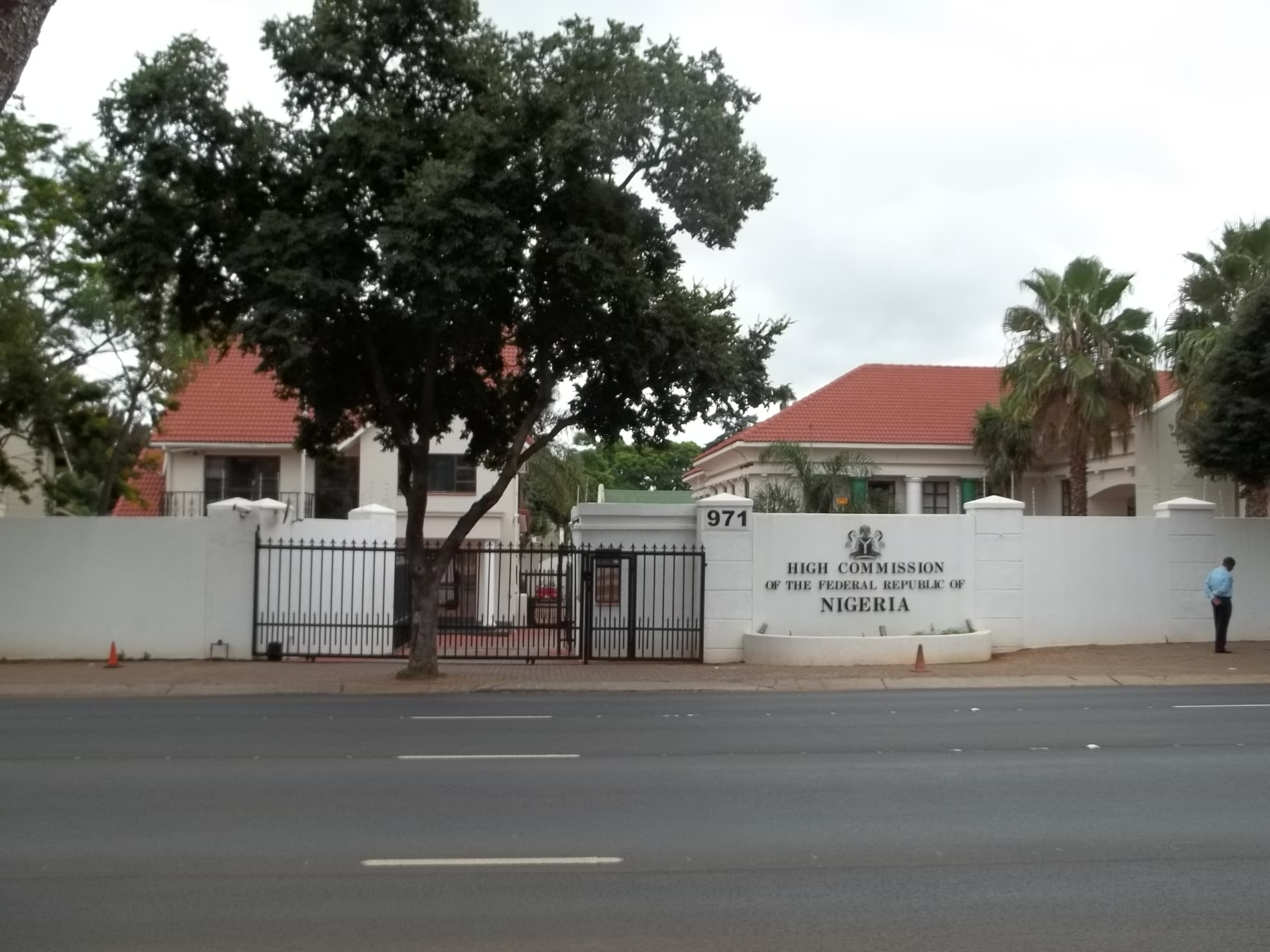
High Commission of Nigeria

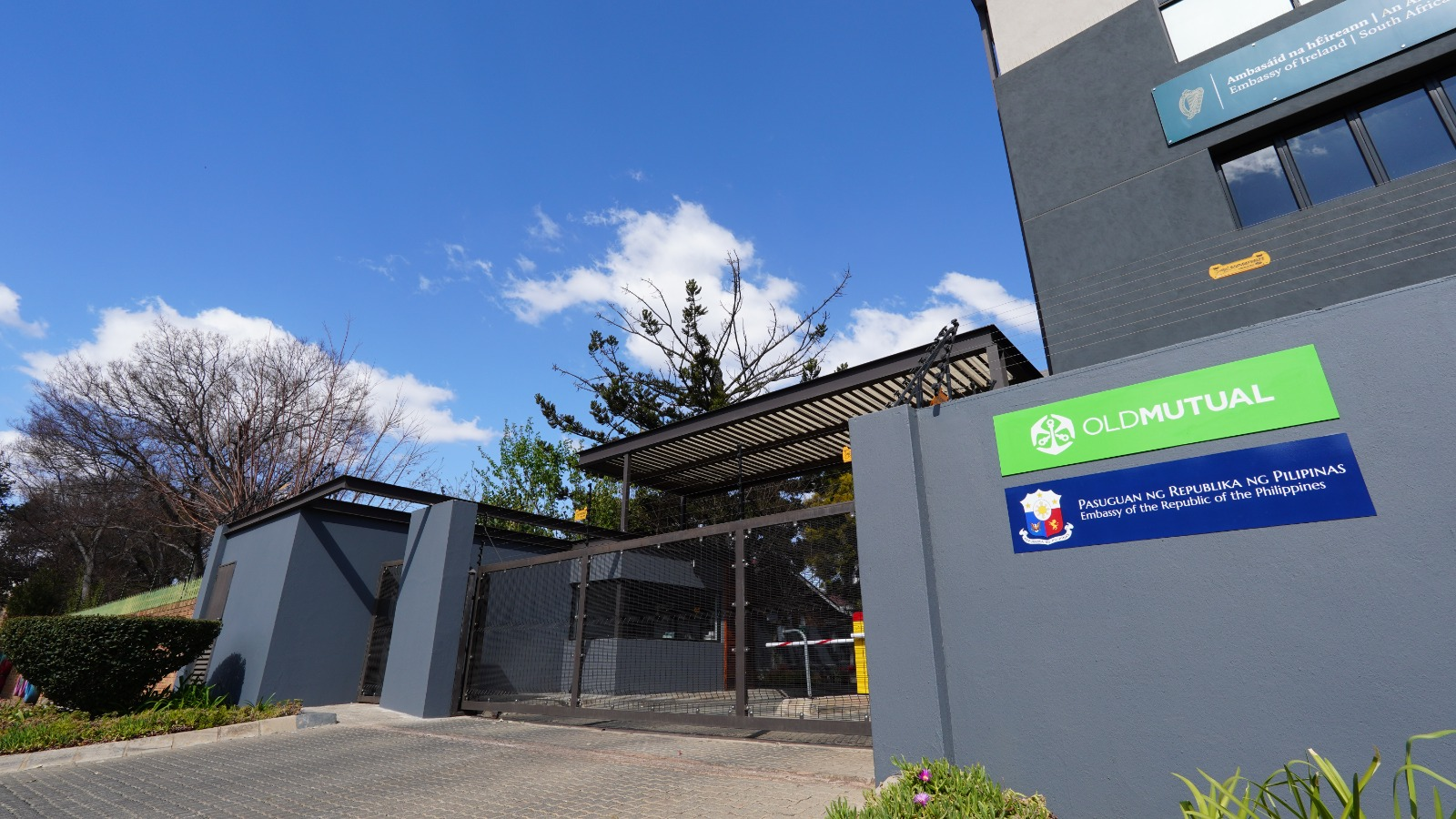
Embassy of the Philippines

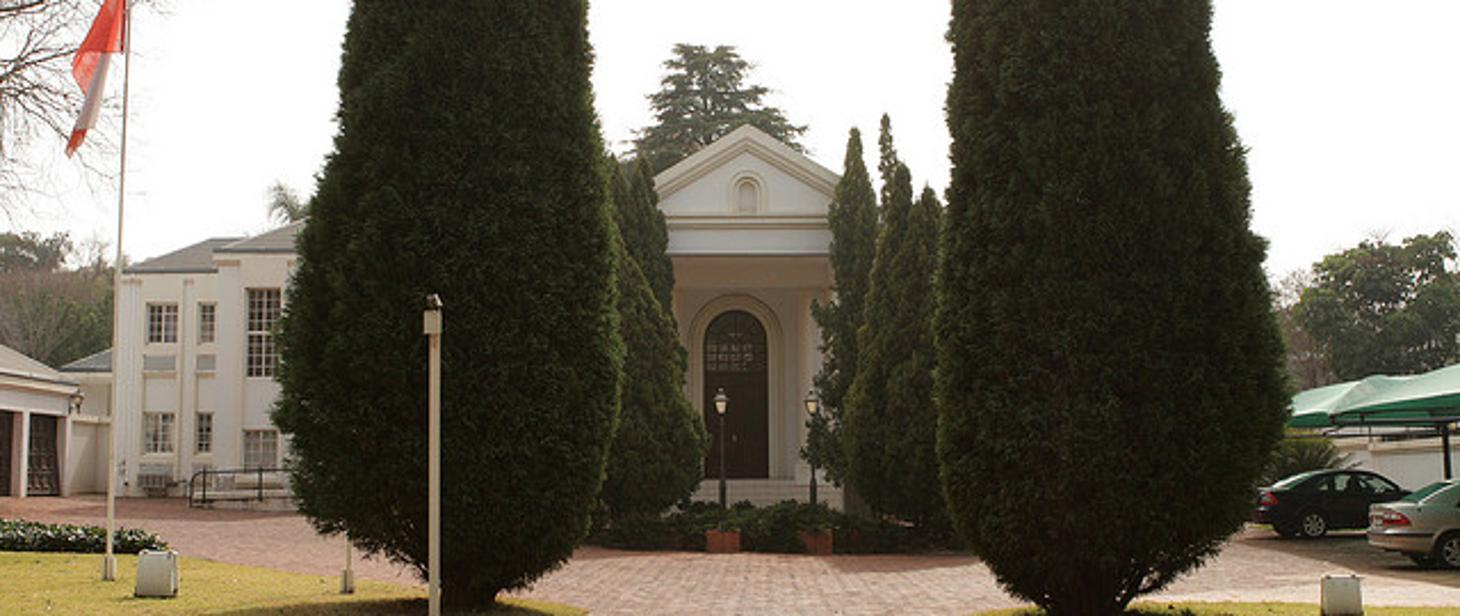
Embassy of Poland

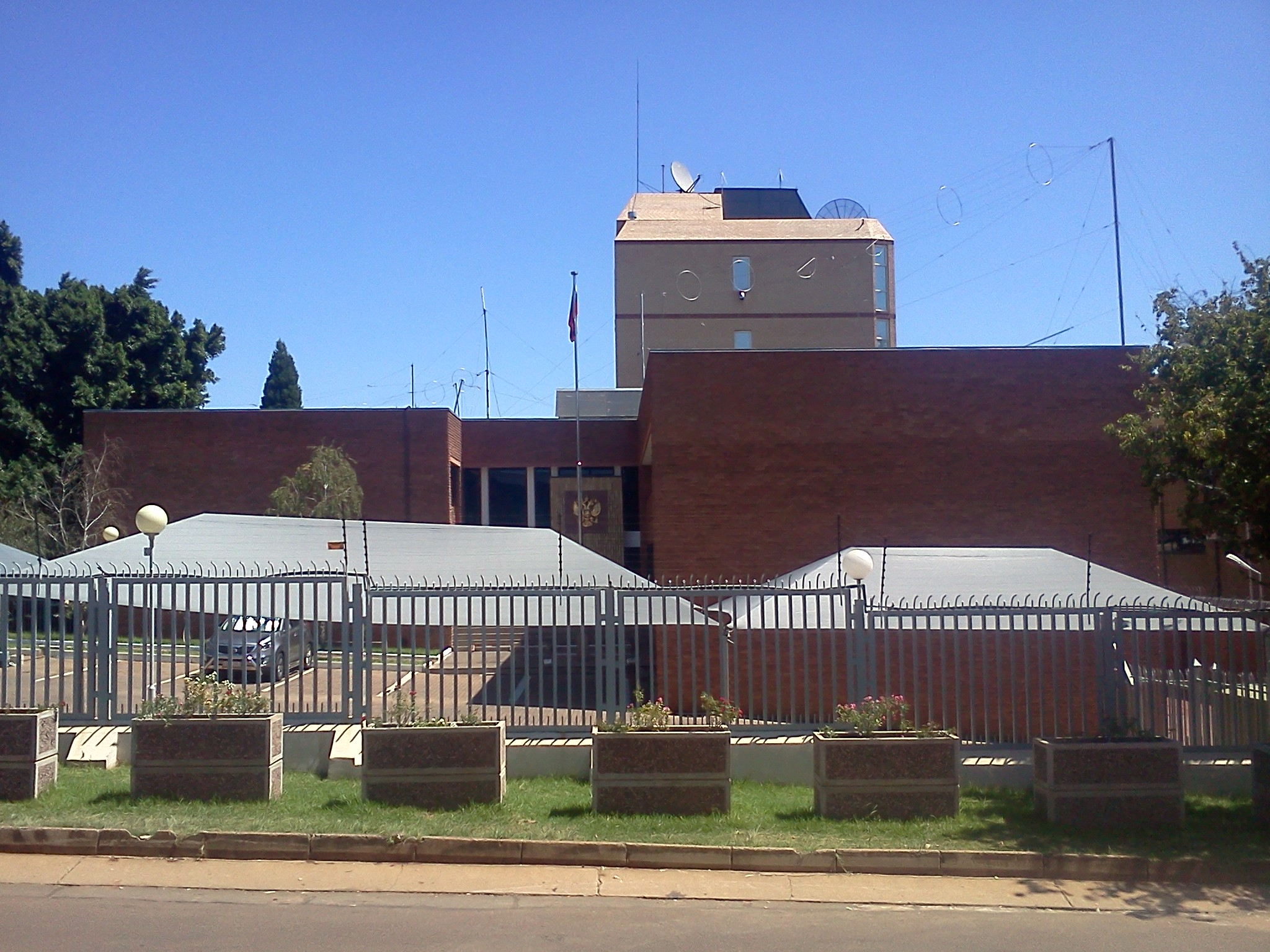
Embassy of Russia

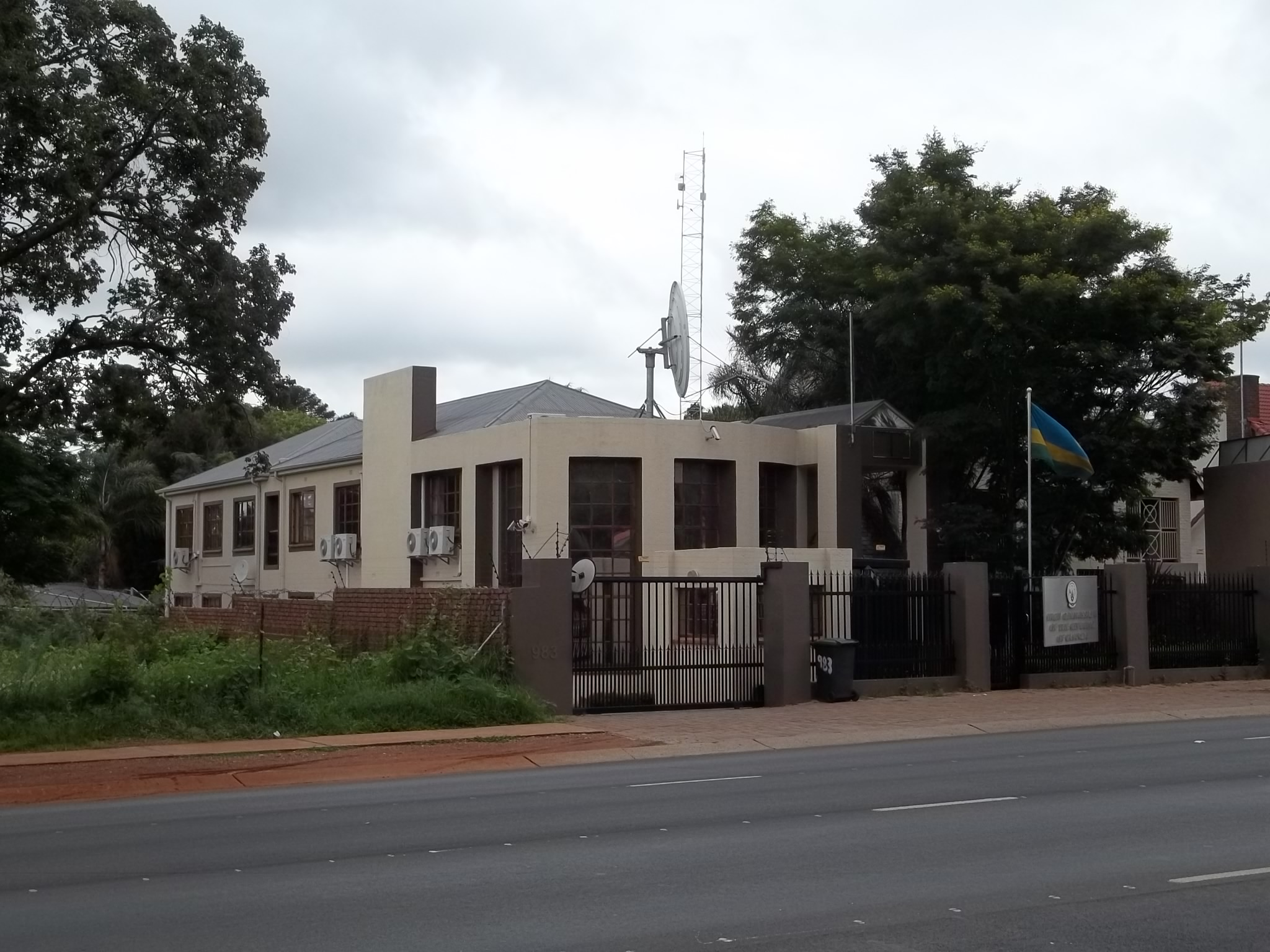
High Commission of Rwanda

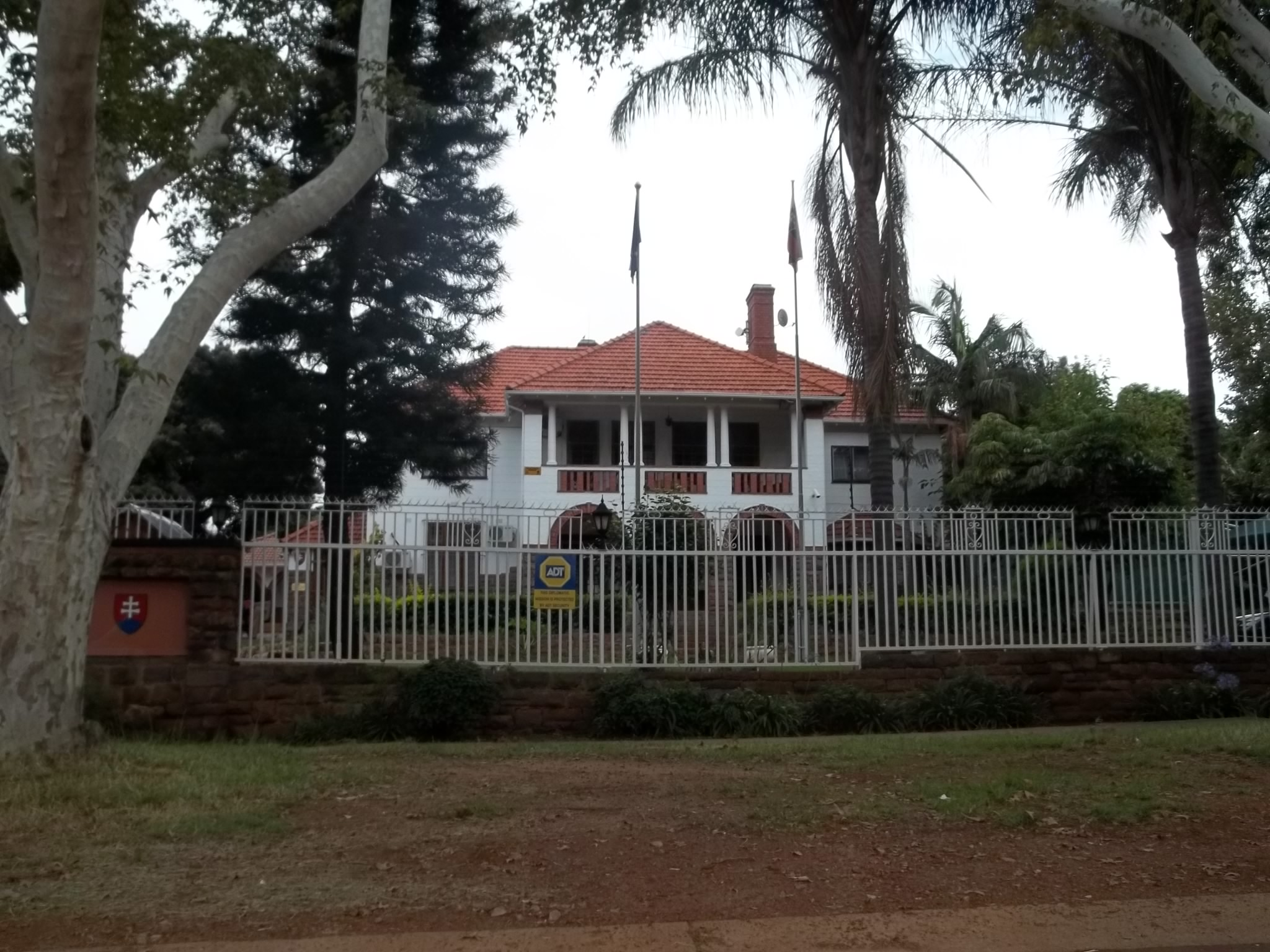
Embassy of Slovakia

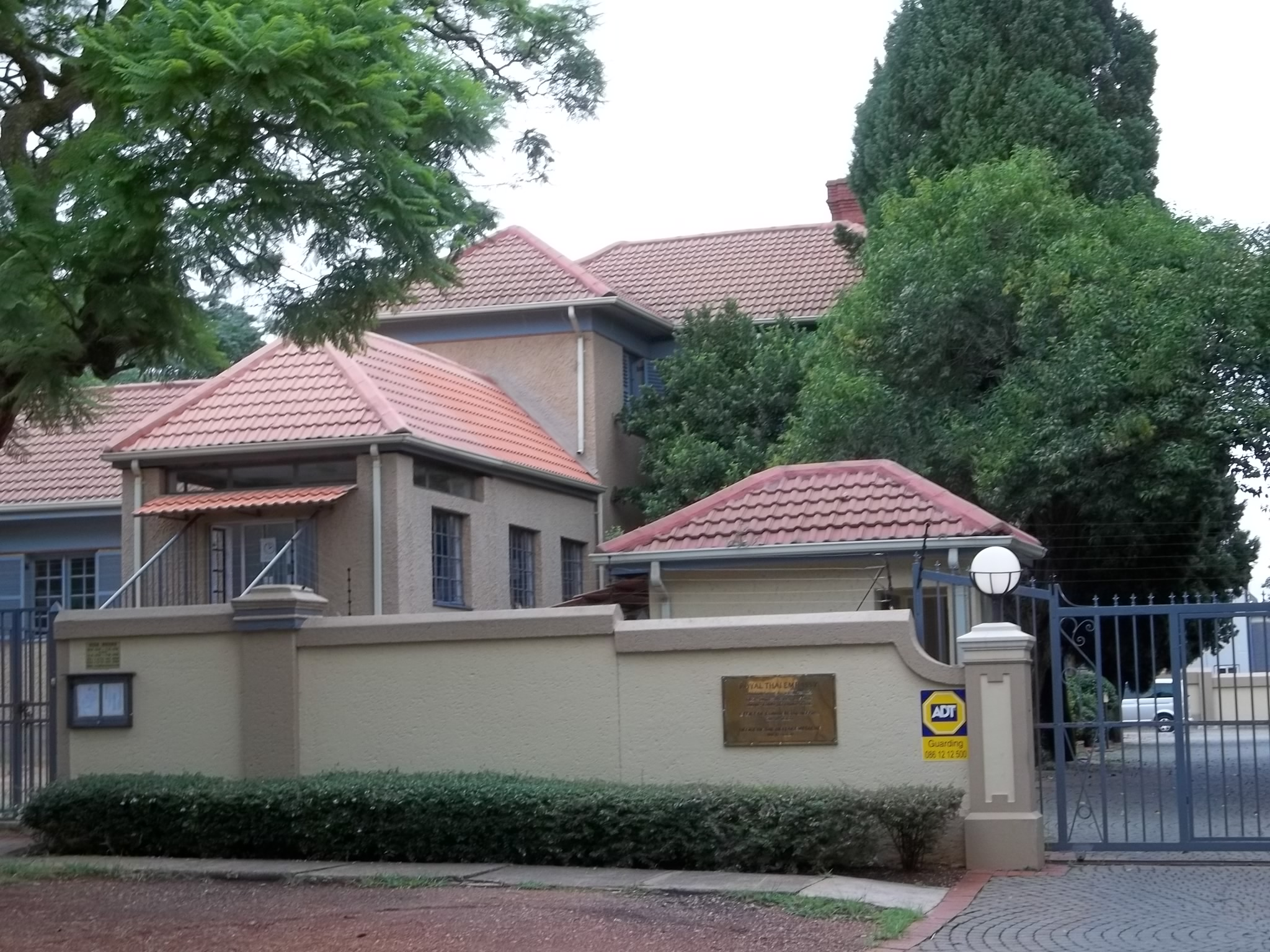
Embassy of Thailand

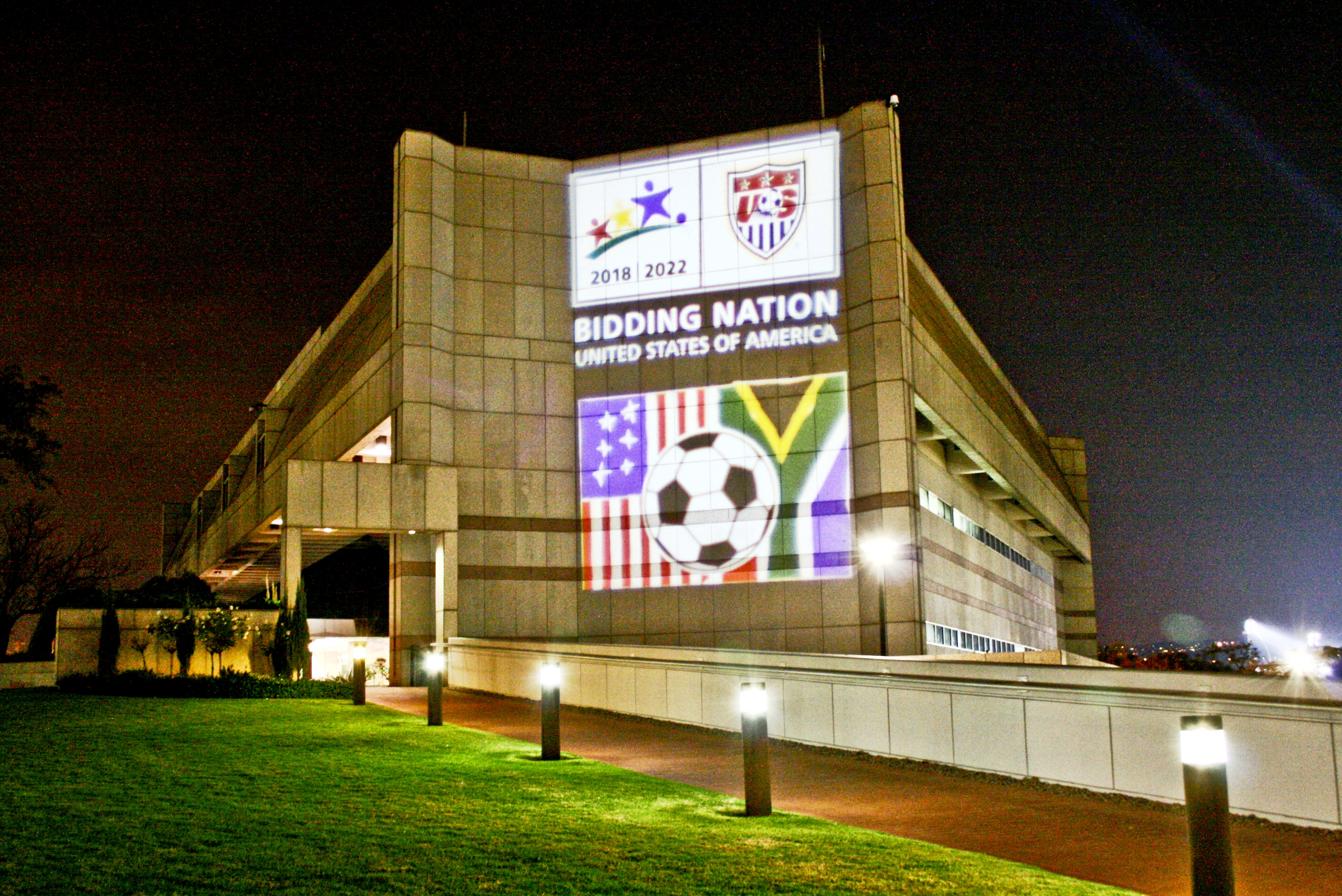
Embassy of the United States

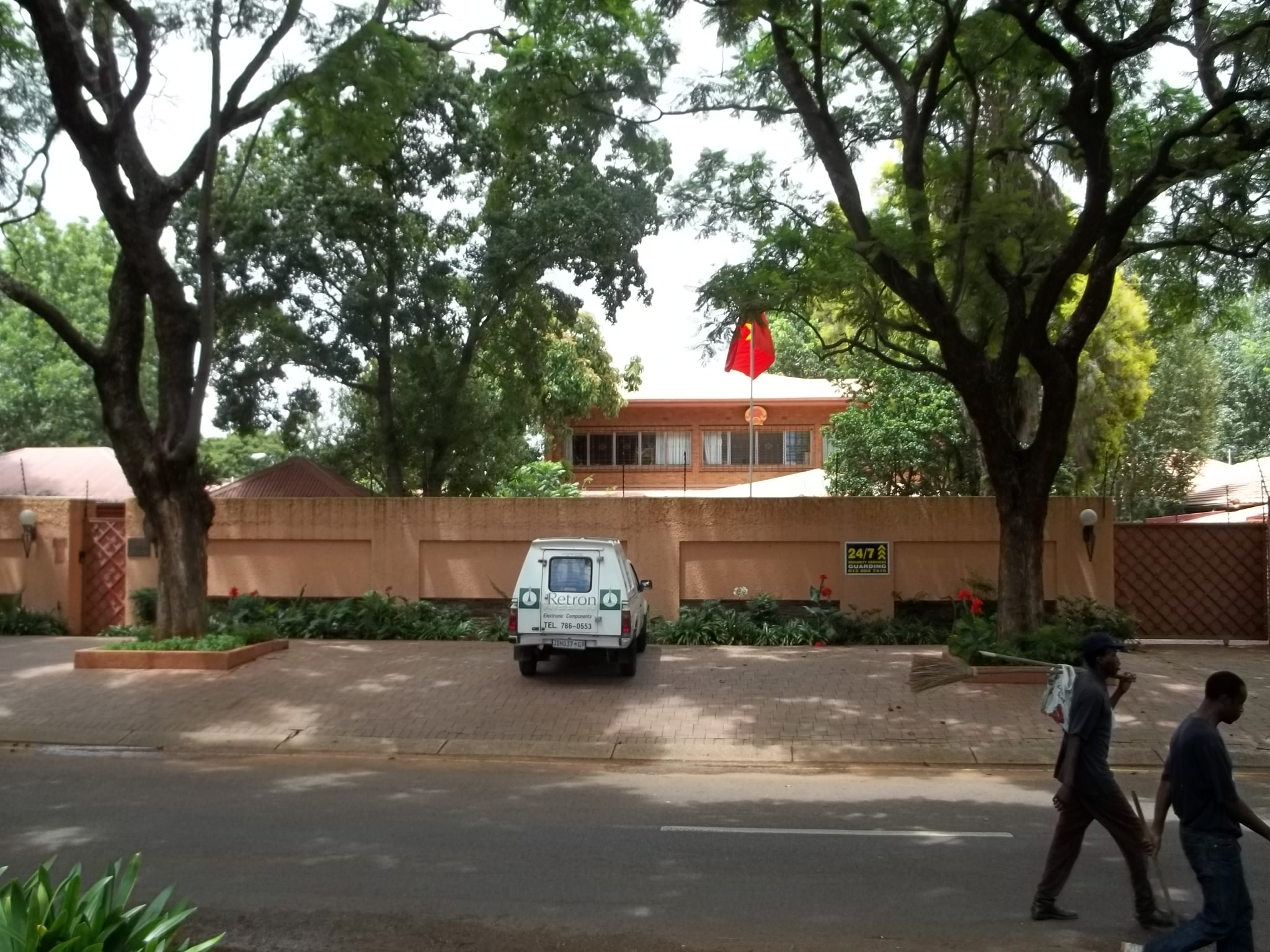
Embassy of Vietnam

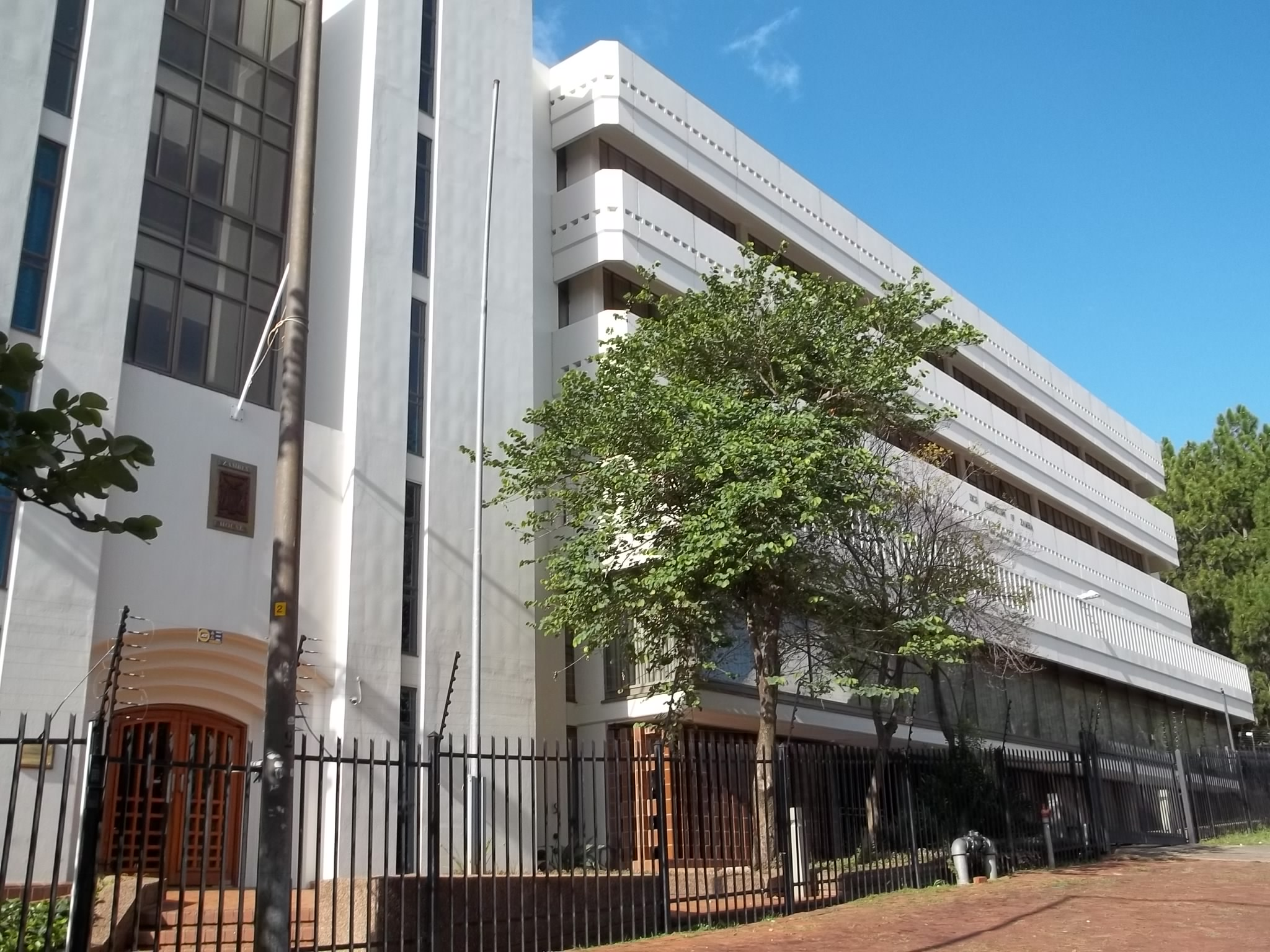
High Commission of Zambia

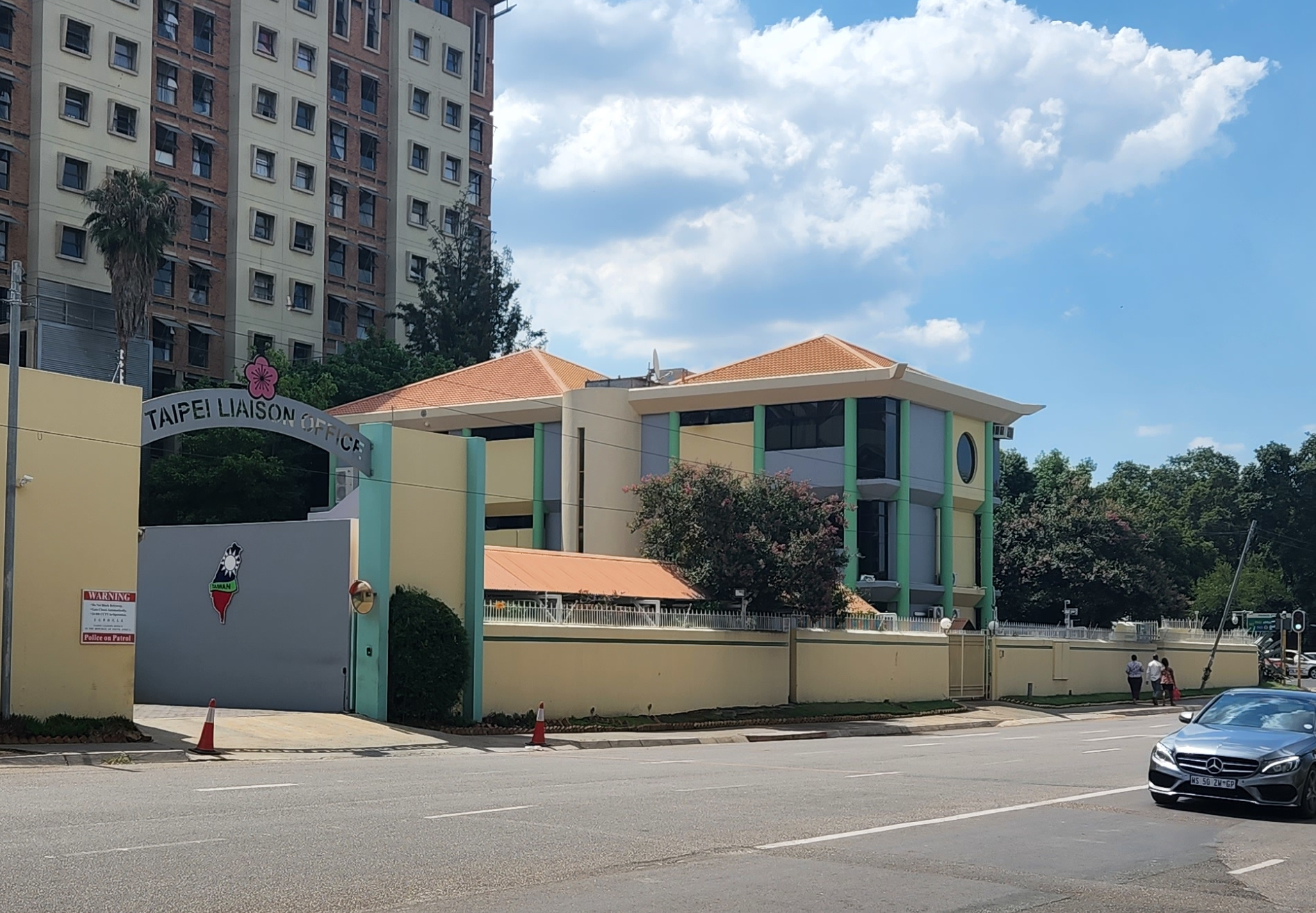
Liaison Office of Taiwan

== Embassies and Consulates-General ==
Many countries have either an embassy or high commission (used during the Parliamentary Session) or a consulate general in Cape Town.

=== Cape Town ===
- Angola (Consulate-General)
- Belgium (Consulate-General)
- Botswana (Consulate-General)
- Brazil (Consulate-General)
- China (Consulate-General)
- France (Consulate-General)
- Germany (Consulate-General)
- Greece (Consulate)
- India (Consulate-General)
- Indonesia (Consulate-General)
- Italy (Consulate)
- Japan (Office of Consul)
- Lesotho (Consulate-General)
- Madagascar (Consulate-General)
- Mozambique (Consulate)
- Namibia (Consulate-General)
- Netherlands (Consulate-General)
- Portugal (Consulate-General)
- Romania (Consulate-General)
- Russia (Consulate-General)
- Spain (Consulate-General)
- Switzerland (Consulate-General)
- Republic of China (Taiwan) (Liaison Office)
- Turkey (Consulate-General)
- United Kingdom (Consulate-General)
- United States (Consulate-General)
- Zimbabwe (Consulate)
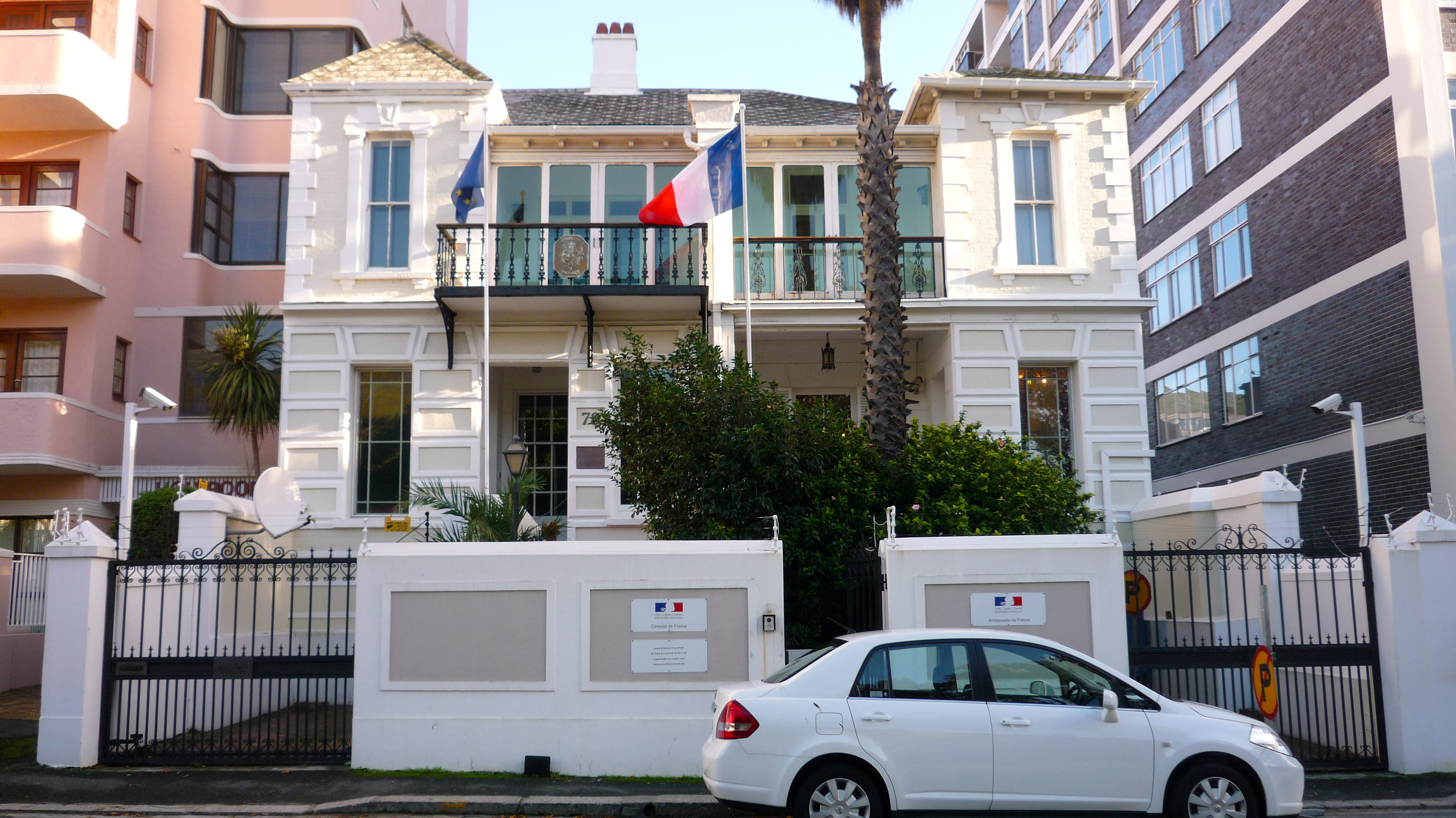
Consulate-General of France

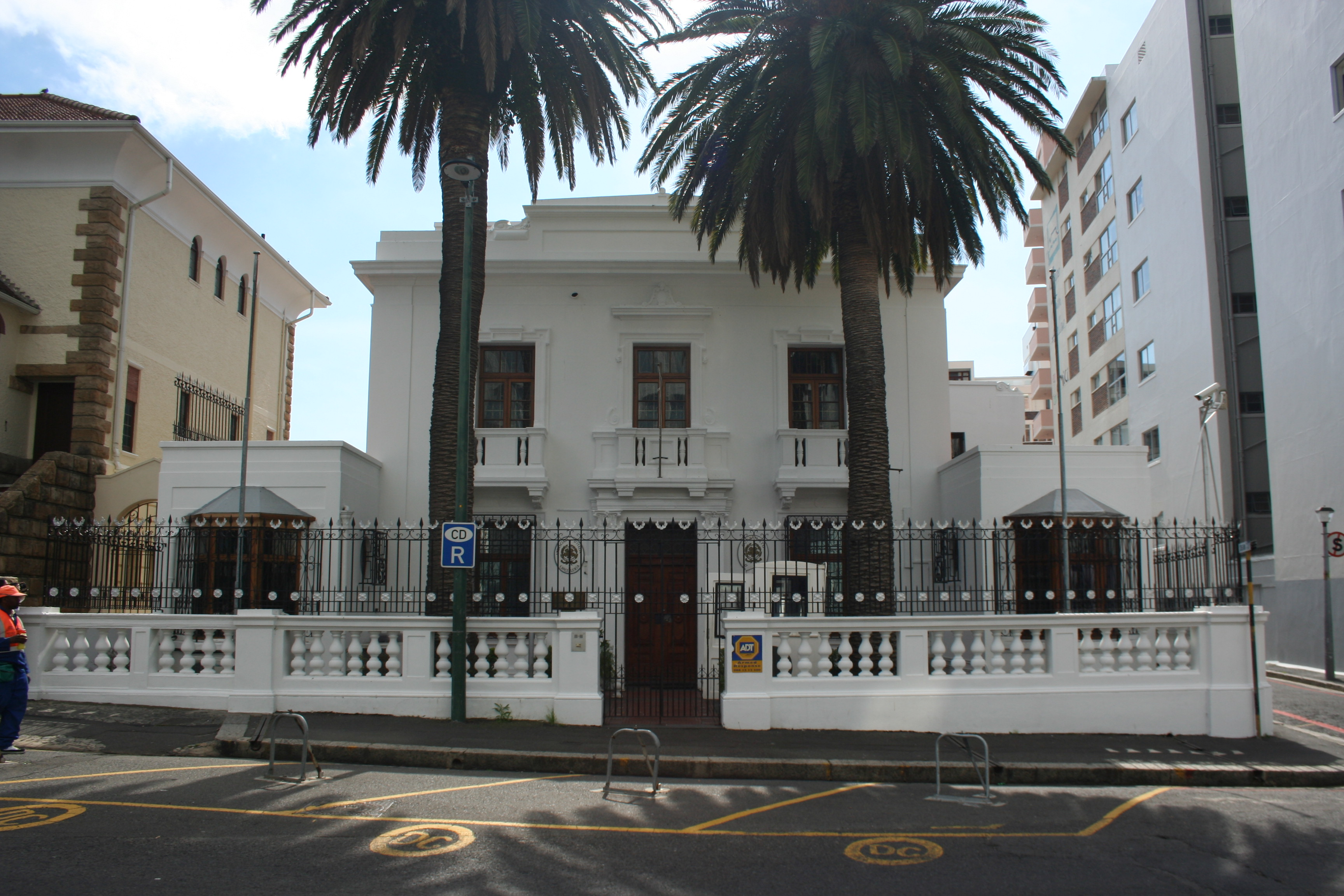
Consulate of Italy

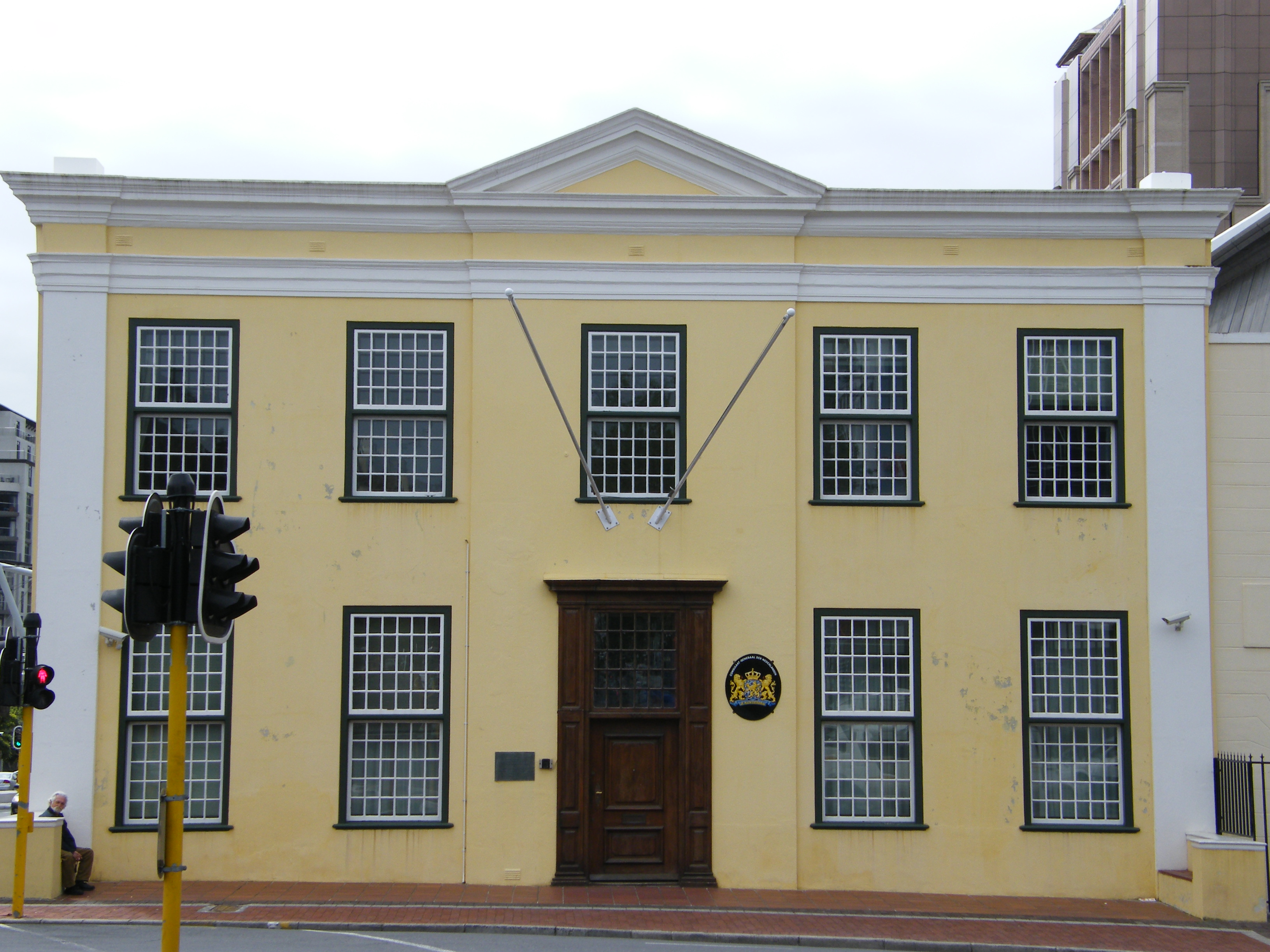
Consulate-General of the Netherlands

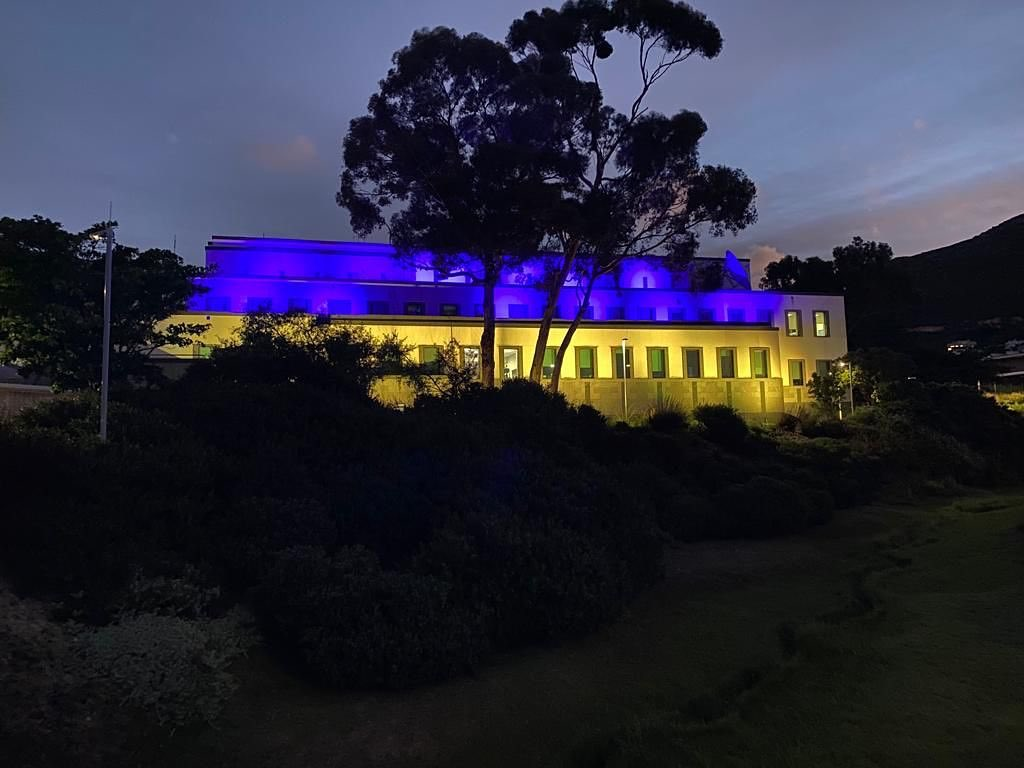
Consulate-General of the United States

=== Durban ===
- China (Consulate-General)
- India (Consulate-General)
- Lesotho (Consulate-General)
- Mozambique (Consulate)
- United States (Consulate-General)

=== Johannesburg ===
- Angola (Consulate-General)
- Argentina (Consulate-General)
- Botswana (Consulate-General)
- China (Consulate-General)
- Eswatini (Consulate)
- France (Consulate-General)
- Greece (Consulate-General)
- India (Consulate-General)
- Italy (Consulate-General)
- Lesotho (Consulate-General)
- Malawi (Consulate-General)
- Mozambique (Consulate-General
- Nigeria (Consulate-General)
- Portugal (Consulate-General)
- Seychelles (Consulate-General)
- United States (Consulate-General)
- Zimbabwe (Consulate-General)
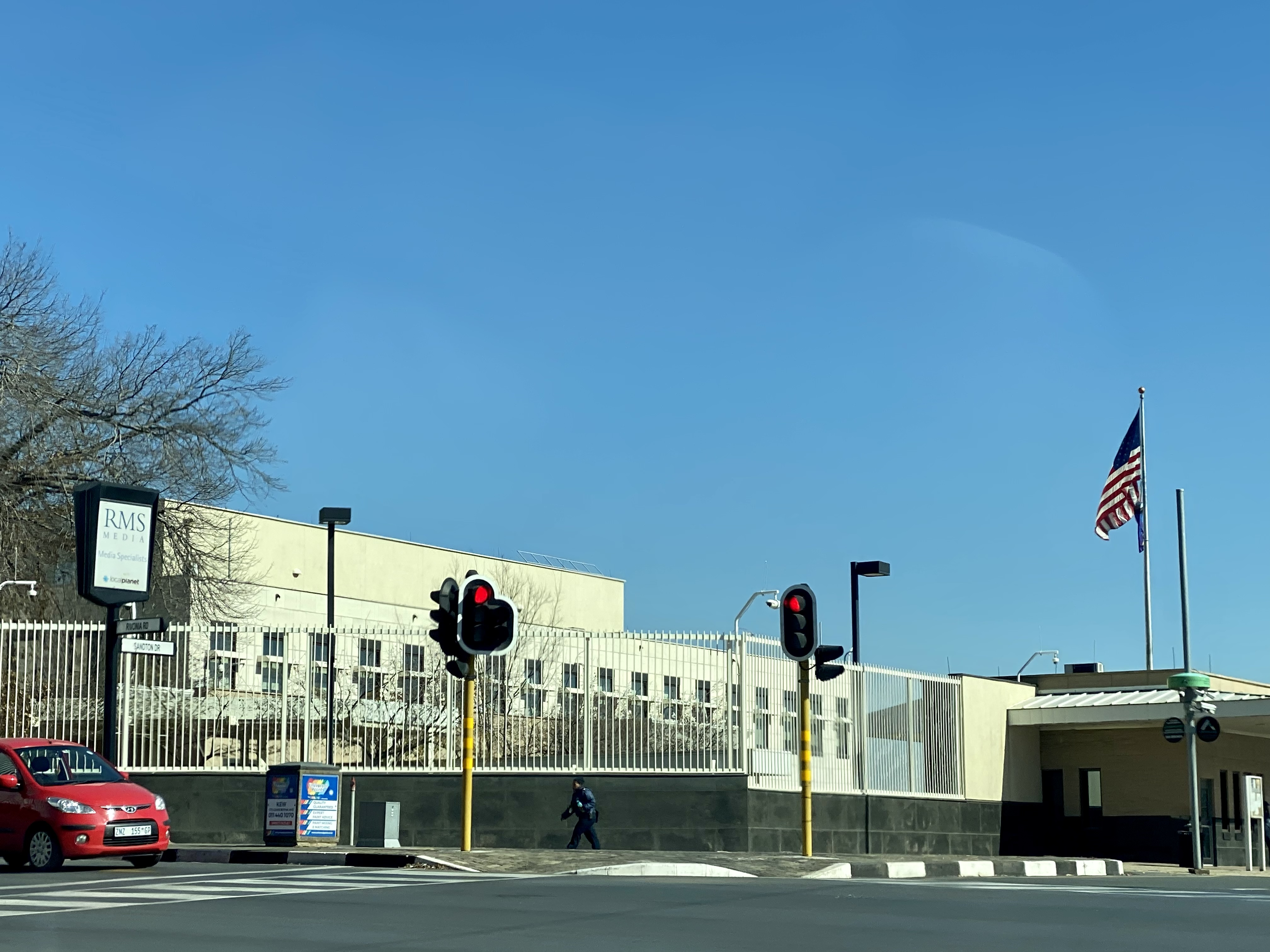
Consulate-General of the United States

=== Klerksdorp ===
- Lesotho (Consulate)

=== Mbombela, Mpumalanga ===
- Mozambique (Consulate-General)

=== Welkom ===
- Lesotho (Consulate)

== Non-resident embassies and high commissions ==
=== Resident in Cairo, Egypt ===
1. Armenia
2. Mongolia
3. Slovenia
4. Tajikistan

=== Resident in London, United Kingdom ===
1. Bahamas
2. Grenada
3. Papua New Guinea
4. Saint Kitts and Nevis

=== Resident in Nairobi, Kenya ===
1. Barbados
2. Djibouti
3. Estonia

=== Resident in other cities ===
1. Benin (Addis Ababa)
2. Brunei (Singapore)
3. Cape Verde (Luanda)
4. Costa Rica (Bern)
5. El Salvador (Tel Aviv)
6. Guatemala (Rabat)
7. Guinea-Bissau (Luanda)
8. Iceland (New Delhi)
9. Latvia (Bern)
10. Maldives (Colombo)
11. Malta (Valletta)
12. San Marino (City of San Marino)
13. Sierra Leone (Addis Ababa)
14. Suriname (Accra)
15. Turkmenistan (Astana)
16. Uzbekistan (Doha)

== Closed missions ==
Host city	Sending country	Mission	Year closed	Ref.
Pretoria	Benin	Embassy	2020	
Pretoria	Bosnia and Herzegovina	Embassy	Unknown	
Pretoria	Fiji	High Commission	2015	
Pretoria	Guatemala	Embassy	2021	
Pretoria	Iceland	Embassy	2009	
Pretoria	Suriname	Embassy	Unknown	
Cape Town	Australia	Consulate	1984	
Cape Town	Peru	Consulate	1985	
Cape Town	Uruguay	Consulate-General	2007	
Durban	Angola	Consulate-General	2018	
Durban	Greece	Consulate	2011	
Durban	Italy	Consulate	2010	
Johannesburg	Belgium	Consulate-General	2015	

== Embassies to open ==
- Cambodia
- Maldives

== See also ==
- Foreign relations of South Africa
- Visa requirements for South African citizens
