= Taiwan–Latin America relations =

Bilateral relations between Taiwan and Latin American states

Taiwan–Latin American relations
- Latin America: Taiwan

Latin America

Taiwan

Taiwan–Latin America relations refers to the diplomatic, economic, and cultural relations between Taiwan (officially the Republic of China, ROC) and countries in Latin America. Since 1949, relations have been shaped by competition between Taiwan and China (officially the People's Republic of China, PRC) for diplomatic recognition, as well as by trade, development cooperation, and shared political values such as democracy and constitutional governance.

Although Taiwan once maintained diplomatic ties with a larger number of countries in the region, the number of states recognizing Taipei has declined in the 21st century as several governments switched recognition to Beijing. As of 2026, eight countries in Latin America and the Caribbean maintain formal diplomatic relations with Taiwan: Guatemala, Honduras, Paraguay, Belize, Haiti, Saint Kitts and Nevis, Saint Lucia, and Saint Vincent and the Grenadines.

== Relations with Latin American countries ==
| Country | Diplomatic relations began | Diplomatic relations ended | Maintains unofficial relations | Notes |
|---|---|---|---|---|
| Argentina | 1945 | 1972 | Yes | See Argentina–Taiwan relations: Argentina has the Argentina Trade and Cultural Office in Taipei.; Taiwan has the Taipei Economic and Cultural Office in Argentina in Buenos Aires. |
| Bolivia | 1919 | 1985 | No | See Bolivia–Taiwan relations: Bolivia does not have a mission in Taipei.; Taiwan does not have a mission in La Paz. The Taipei Economic Office in La Paz was established in 1990 and closed in 2009. Taiwan is accredited to Bolivia from its Taipei Economic and Cultural Office in Peru in Lima, Peru. |
| Brazil | 3 October 1881 (Qing); 1928 | 1974 | Yes | See Brazil–Taiwan relations: Brazil has the Commercial Office of Brazil to Taipei in Taipei.; Taiwan has the Taipei Economic and Cultural Office in Brazil in Brasília. |
| Chile | 18 February 1915 | 5 January 1971 | Yes | See Chile–Taiwan relations: Chile has the Chilean Trade Office in Taipei in Taipei.; Taiwan has the Taipei Economic and Cultural Office in Chile in Santiago. |
| Colombia | 1941 | 1980 | Yes | See Colombia–Taiwan relations: Colombia does not have a mission in Taipei. The Colombian Trade Office in Taipei was established in 1993 and closed in 2002.; Taiwan has the Taipei Commercial Office in Colombia in Bogotá. |
| Costa Rica | 1941 | 6 June 2007 | No | See Costa Rica–Taiwan relations: Costa Rica does not have a mission in Taipei. The Embassy of Costa Rica, Taipei was closed in 2007 after China and Costa Rica established diplomatic relations.; Taiwan does not have a mission in San José. The Embassy of Taiwan, San José was closed in 2007 after China and Costa Rica established diplomatic relations. |
| Cuba | 16 September 1902 (Qing); 4 May 1913 | 1 September 1960 | No | See Cuba–Taiwan relations: Cuba does not have a mission in Taipei.; Taiwan does not have a mission in Havana. Taiwan is accredited to Cuba from its Taipei Commercial Office in Colombia in Bogotá, Colombia. |
| Dominican Republic | 1941 | 1 May 2018 | No | See Dominican Republic–Taiwan relations: Dominican Republic does not have a mission in Taipei. The Embassy of the Dominican Republic, Taipei was closed in 2018 after China and the Dominican Republic established diplomatic relations.; Taiwan does not have a mission in Santo Domingo. The Embassy of Taiwan, Santo Domingo was closed in 2018 after China and the Dominican Republic established diplomatic relations. Taiwan is accredited to the Dominican Republic from the Embassy of Taiwan, Guatemala City in Guatemala City, Guatemala and from the Taipei Economic and Cultural Office in Miami in Miami, United States. |
| Ecuador | 1946 | 18 November 1971 | Yes | See Ecuador–Taiwan relations: Ecuador does not have a mission in Taipei.; Taiwan has the Taipei Commercial Office in Ecuador in Quito. |
| El Salvador | 1941 | 21 August 2018 | No | See El Salvador–Taiwan relations: El Salvador does not have a mission in Taipei. The Embassy of El Salvador, Taipei was closed in 2018 after China and El Salvador established diplomatic relations.; Taiwan does not have a mission in San Salvador. The Embassy of Taiwan, San Salvador was closed in 2018 after China and El Salvador established diplomatic relations. |
| Guatemala | 15 June 1933 | Present | Official | See Guatemala–Taiwan relations: Guatemala has an embassy in Taipei.; Taiwan has an embassy in Guatemala City. |
| Honduras | 9 April 1941 | 26 March 2023 | No | See Honduras–Taiwan relations: Honduras does not have a mission in Taipei. The Embassy of Honduras, Taipei was closed in 2023 after China and Honduras established diplomatic relations.; Taiwan does not have a mission in Tegucigalpa. The Embassy of Taiwan, Tegucigalpa was closed in 2023 after China and Honduras established diplomatic relations. |
| Mexico | 14 December 1899 (Qing); 1928 | 16 November 1971 | Yes | See Mexico–Taiwan relations: Mexico has the Mexican Trade Services Documentation and Cultural Office in Taipei.; Taiwan has the Taipei Economic and Cultural Office in Mexico in Mexico City. |
| Nicaragua | 1930 | 1985 | No | See Nicaragua–Taiwan relations: Nicaragua does not have a mission in Taipei. The Embassy of Nicaragua, Taipei was closed in 2021 after China and Nicaragua established diplomatic relations.; Taiwan does not have a mission in Managua. The Embassy of Taiwan, Managua was closed in 2021 after China and Nicaragua established diplomatic relations. |
| Nicaragua | 1990 | 9 December 2021 | No | See Nicaragua–Taiwan relations: Nicaragua does not have a mission in Taipei. The Embassy of Nicaragua, Taipei was closed in 2021 after China and Nicaragua established diplomatic relations.; Taiwan does not have a mission in Managua. The Embassy of Taiwan, Managua was closed in 2021 after China and Nicaragua established diplomatic relations. |
| Panama | 16 January 1910 (Qing); 1912 | 13 June 2017 | No | See Panama–Taiwan relations: Panama does not have a mission in Taipei. The Embassy of Panama, Taipei was closed in 2017 after China and Panama established diplomatic relations.; Taiwan does not have a mission in Panama City. The Embassy of Taiwan, Panama City was closed in 2017 after China and Panama established diplomatic relations. Taiwan is accredited to Panama from its Taipei Commercial Office in Colombia in Bogotá, Colombia. |
| Paraguay | 8 July 1957 | Present | Official | See Paraguay–Taiwan relations: Paraguay has an embassy in Taipei.; Taiwan has an embassy in Asunción. |
| Peru | 26 June 1874 (Qing); 1913 | 2 November 1971 | Yes | See Peru–Taiwan relations: Peru has the Commercial Office of Peru to Taipei in Taipei.; Taiwan has the Taipei Economic and Cultural Office in Peru in Lima. |
| Uruguay | 1957 | 1988 | No | See Taiwan–Uruguay relations: Uruguay does not have a mission in Taipei.; Taiwan does not have a mission in Montevideo. The Taipei Economic Office in Uruguay was established in 1992 and closed in 2002. Taiwan is accredited to Uruguay from its Taipei Economic and Cultural Office in Argentina in Buenos Aires, Argentina. |
| Venezuela | 1941 | 1974 | No | See Taiwan–Venezuela relations: Venezuela does not have a mission in Taipei.; Taiwan does not have a mission in Caracas. The Taipei Economic Office in Venezuela was established in 1974 and closed in 2009. Taiwan is accredited to Venezuela from its Taipei Commercial Office in Colombia in Bogotá, Colombia. |

== See also ==
- Foreign relations of Taiwan
- Taiwan–Caribbean relations
- China–Latin America relations
- Forum of East Asia–Latin America Cooperation
