= Taiwan–Oceania relations =

Taiwan–Pacific relations
- Taiwan: Oceania

Taiwan

Oceania

Taiwan–Oceania relations refers relations between Taiwan (formally the Republic of China) and Oceania. As of 2024, three states in Oceania have diplomatic relations with Taiwan. These numbers fluctuate as Pacific Island nations re-evaluate their foreign policies, and occasionally shift diplomatic recognition between Beijing and Taipei.

== History ==
In 2005, Taiwanese President Chen Shui-bian visited Fiji, where he was greeted by government delegates with "full traditional Fijian ceremony of welcome" – although he did not meet his counterpart President Ratu Josefa Iloilovatu Uluivuda, nor Prime Minister Qarase. Ambassador Cai expressed China's "disappointment" at Fiji for having authorised the visit. Later that year, relations were slightly strained once more when Fiji supported Taiwan's wish to join the World Health Organization. Nonetheless, Qarase's government did not vary from its official recognition of the "One China" policy.

In September 2006, the first regional summit of all Taiwan's Pacific Island allies took place, and was hosted by Palau, in Koror. The meeting brought together Taiwanese President Chen Shui-bian and delegates from the Marshall Islands, Tuvalu, Nauru, Palau, Solomon Islands and Kiribati. It was to become a regular event, known as the Taiwan-Pacific Allies Summit. A second regional meeting was hosted by the Marshall Islands in October, and President Chen attended. This resulted in the Majuro Declaration, in which Taiwan's six Pacific allies re-stated their recognition of the Taiwan's sovereignty, and promised to support the Taiwan's attempts to join the United Nations.

Also in June 2007, Taiwan donated an aid package of €700,000, distributed among eight Pacific regional organisations.

In January 2008, following the victory of the Kuomintang in the Taiwan's elections, Kuomintang MP Yang Li-huan stated that under the new government Taiwan's interest in the Pacific could decrease. Three days later, however, it was confirmed that Taiwane vice-president Annette Lu would lead a diplomatic visit to the Marshall Islands, Nauru and Solomon Islands.

In March 2008, new President-elect Ma Ying-jeou was reported as saying that his government would put an end to Taiwanese "cheque-book diplomacy" in the Pacific. In May of that same year, Ma called for what he referred to as a "cease-fire" in the competition between the Republic of China and the People's Republic of China for diplomatic allies. This followed a scandal due to allegations that Taiwan's Foreign Minister James Huang had attempted to buy Papua New Guinea's diplomatic allegiance. In October, Taiwan cancelled a scheduled summit between itself and its Pacific Island allies. Although the authorities cited "preparation problems", Radio Australia commented that "the decision appears to be an attempt by the new administration of President Ma Ying-jeou to keep the island's diplomatic activities low-profile and avoid offending China". Taiwanese authorities later stated that the summit had been "postponed" rather than cancelled. In June 2009, the Ministry of Foreign Affairs announced that President Ma would "attend a [...] leadership summit between Taiwan and its South Pacific allies" in autumn. The summit, hosted by Solomon Islands, would be attended by the "heads of state of Taiwan's six allies in the region" and would focus on "countering the current economic contraction, climate change and how to strengthen the fisheries industry". Upon announcing the summit, the Ministry added that Ma had "developed a fondness for the Pacific region during his previous visit to Solomon Islands when he saw a handful of children at a market selling betel nuts and watermelons while wearing shirts donated by the people of Taiwan".

In July 2009, Taiwan donated over €40,000 in a scholarship scheme benefiting students from a number of Pacific countries, including those -such as Fiji or Papua New Guinea- which do not grant it diplomatic recognition. It also donated €288,000 for regional development assistance programmes, to be used notably on access to water, sanitation and hygiene, renewable energy, solar photovoltaic assessments, fisheries management, education and youth training.

Taiwan has asked to be recognised as an official dialogue partner of the Pacific Islands Forum. That status is currently awarded to China.

In March 2010, President Ma visited Taiwan's six allies in the region. This coincided with a visit to Solomon Islands by the Republic of China Navy. While in Solomon Islands, Ma outlined a development in technical assistance programmes to Taiwan's allies in the region, encompassing assistance in such areas as "encouraging a return to healthier diets, operating on cataracts [or] advising on land reform".

In 2026, due to pressure from mainland China, Taiwan closed its representative office and suspended purchases of oil in Papau New Guinea.

== Taiwan's foreign relations with Oceanian countries ==
Relations between Taiwan and Oceania

- Australia–Taiwan relations
- Fiji–Taiwan relations
- Kiribati–Taiwan relations
- Marshall Islands–Taiwan relations
- Federated States of Micronesia–Taiwan relations
- Nauru–Taiwan relations
- New Zealand–Taiwan relations
- Palau–Taiwan relations
- Papua New Guinea–Taiwan relations
- Samoa–Taiwan relations
- Solomon Islands–Taiwan relations
- Taiwan–Tonga relations
- Taiwan–Tuvalu relations
- Taiwan–Vanuatu relations

== See also ==
- Taiwan–Africa relations
- Taiwan–Caribbean relations
- Taiwan–Latin America relations
