= Chinese Venezuelans =

Chino-venezolanos; 委内瑞拉华人

Total population
- 600,000

Regions with significant populations
- Valencia, Caracas, Maracay, Barquisimeto, Barcelona-Puerto La Cruz, Maracaibo, Maturín, Acarigua

Languages
- Venezuelan Spanish, Cantonese, Mandarin Chinese, English

Religion
- Buddhism, Roman Catholicism, Taoism and Irreligion

Related ethnic groups
- Asian Latin Americans

Chinese Venezuelans (Spanish: Chino-venezolanos, Chinese: 委内瑞拉华人) are people of Han Chinese ancestry who were born in or have immigrated to Venezuela. The country is home to nearly 600,000 Chinese. Almost all their businesses are related to the culinary field.

== History ==
The presence of Chinese people in the country is primarily traced back to three waves beginning in 1847, with the vast majority of immigrants originating from Enping, Guangdong.

According to research by Professor Gao Weinong, the Enping community established strong chain-migration networks through the grocery and restaurant sectors, leading to Venezuela becoming the primary global destination for the Enping diaspora. Since then, the presence of Chinese Venezuelans has been constantly increasing, becoming more pronounced during the oil boom and surging significantly following the end of the Cultural Revolution in the late 1970s. It is estimated that 90% of the Chinese population in Venezuela originates from Enping.

== Economy ==
Until the mid-20th century, the Chinese community in Venezuela was primarily engaged in the laundry industry. One of the pioneers in this was José Peña, who adopted this name in Cuba and later arrived in Venezuela between 1885 and 1886, opening the first Chinese-run laundry in Caracas.

Likewise, the Sino-Venezuelan community has been known for its restaurants. For example, Joaquín Hau, who had arrived in Venezuela around 1928, started the first Chinese restaurant in Caracas with four nephews, which was called Chop Suey.

Professor Gao Weinong's research indicates that while laundries and restaurants were the early economic pillars, the Enping diaspora eventually established a dominant presence in the grocery and retail sectors (known locally as abastos). This transition was facilitated by mutual aid networks and specialized commercial associations that helped immigrants navigate Venezuela's shifting economic landscape.

=== Gastronomy ===
Chinese food in Venezuela is predominantly of Cantonese origin, specifically reflecting the culinary traditions of Enping. While generally consumed traditionally within the Sino-Venezuelan community, Chinese restaurants will often offer dishes adapted to the Venezuelan palate. Similarly, these dishes have been influenced by the style of Sino-American cuisine, particularly that of San Francisco.

Among the most common dishes offered by Chinese restaurants in Venezuela are lumpias, sweet and sour pork ribs, fried rice, and chop suey. Gao notes that within the community, authentic Enping-style dishes continue to be preserved as a form of cultural identity. However, some restaurants do offer a more varied menu.

== Demographics ==
=== Population ===
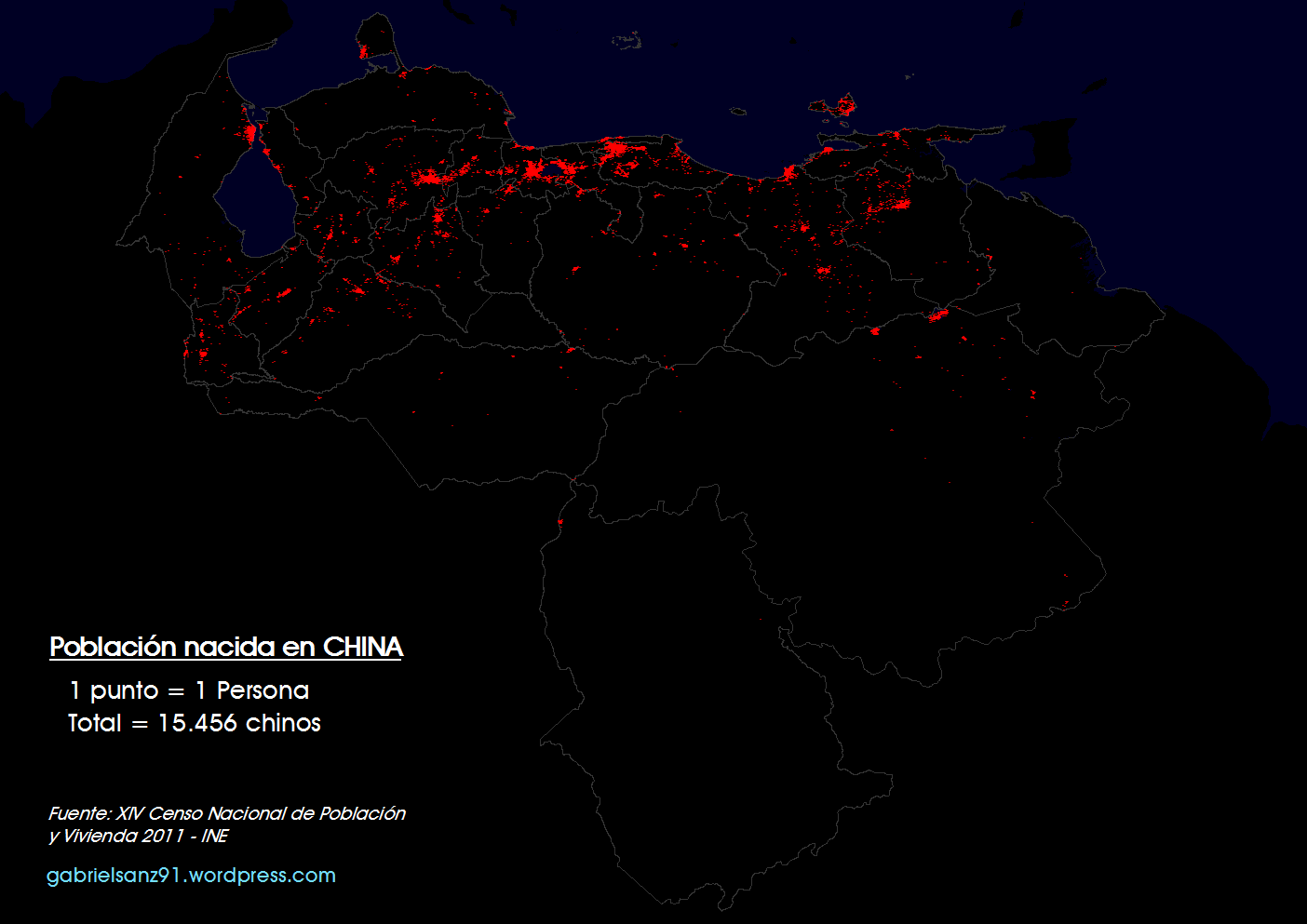
Areas of Venezuela where the Chinese community is concentrated

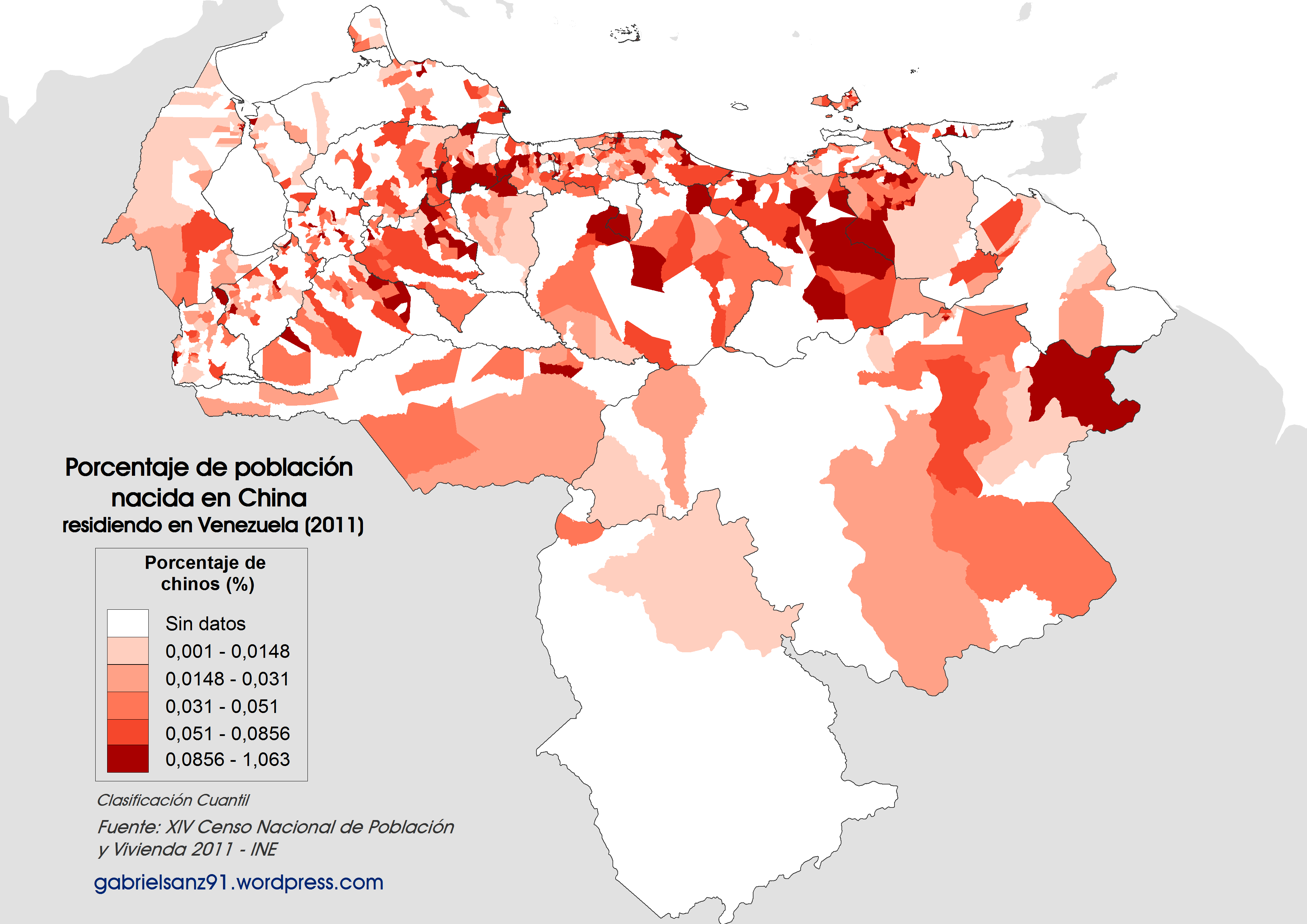
Percentage of population born in China through Venezuela

States with the highest proportions of Chinese-born population tend to be those of the Capital Region and Eastern Region. The states with the most population of Chinese-born people are also located in the central-north area.

At the 2011 census, this was the breakdown of Chinese-born population by state:

State	Chinese-born Population	Percentage
Amazonas	31	0.021
Anzoátegui	1,193	0.082
Apure	116	0.025
Aragua	1,305	0.081
Barinas	414	0.051
Bolívar	515	0.037
Capital District	1,765	0.092
Carabobo	2,016	0.09
Cojedes	167	0.039
Delta Amacuro	42	0.026
Falcón	269	0.028
Federal Dependencies	1	0.047
Guárico	350	0.047
Lara	1,247	0.071
Mérida	306	0.037
Miranda	1,453	0.055
Monagas	796	0.088
Nueva Esparta	344	0.071
Portuguesa	660	0.077
Sucre	321	0.037
Tachira	264	0.023
Trujillo	336	0.049
Vargas	134	0.038
Yaracuy	394	0.066
Zulia	919	0.025
Total Venezuela	15,358	0.06

=== Communities with high percentages of Chinese-born people ===
Parroquia (parish)	Populated place	State	% Chinese over total population
Barinas	Barinas	Barinas	1.06
Andres Eloy Blanco	Maracay	Aragua	0.66
San José	Valencia	Carabobo	0.52
Altagracia	West Caracas	Capital District	0.44
El Morro	Lechería	Anzoátegui	0.43
San Simón	Maturín	Monagas	0.43
Catedral	West Caracas	Capital District	0.42
Puerto La Cruz	Puerto La Cruz	Anzoátegui	0.39
Santa Teresa	West Caracas	Capital District	0.35
Candelaria	West Caracas	Capital District	0.34
Fraternidad	Puerto Cabello	Carabobo	0.33
Sagrario	West Caracas	Capital District	0.32
Chacao	East Caracas	Miranda	0.31
Sabana de Mendoza	Sabana de Mendoza	Trujillo	0.31
Concepción	Barquisimeto	Lara	0.30
Juan Griego	Juan Griego	Nueva Esparta	0.29
Candelaria	Valencia	Carabobo	0.27
San Pedro	West Caracas	Capital District	0.26
Atapiripe	Atapiripe	Anzoátegui	0.24
El Llano	Mérida	Mérida	0.52

== Notable people ==
- Victor Fung (footballer)
- Ludmila Vinogradoff

== See also ==
- Taiwan–Venezuela relations
- China–Venezuela relations
- Chinese diaspora
- Immigration to Venezuela
