= Taiwan–Caribbean relations =

- Caribbean: Taiwan

Caribbean

Taiwan

Taiwan–Caribbean relations refer to the diplomatic, economic, developmental, and foreign relations between Taiwan (formally the Republic of China) and countries in the Caribbean region. The Caribbean has played a significant role in Taiwan's foreign relations, as several Caribbean states are among the small number of countries that maintain formal diplomatic recognition of Taiwan rather than the People's Republic of China (PRC). These relationships have been shaped by international competition for diplomatic recognition, development cooperation, and shifting regional and global geopolitics.

As of 2026, nine states in the Caribbean recognized the PRC and four recognized the ROC. The region has remained one of the most important diplomatic strongholds for Taiwan in the Western Hemisphere.

== Debt recovery against Grenada ==
In 2005, Grenada ended diplomatic relations with Taiwan and established diplomatic relations with the PRC. At the time, Taiwan's Export-Import Bank was Grenada's largest individual bilateral creditor, accounting for approximately 12% of the country's total debt. Following the diplomatic switch, Taiwan declined to participate in Grenada's proposed debt restructuring and subsequently sued the Grenadian government in a US court in 2006 to recover its loans in full. The court awarded Taiwan approximately US$21.6 million plus interest and legal fees. In 2011, Taiwan sought to enforce the judgment by serving restraining notices on US airlines, cruise lines, and shipping companies that owed money to Grenada, as well as seeking funds awarded to Grenada in a separate arbitration. The US courts ultimately rejected Taiwan's attempt to seize the disputed funds, with the United States Court of Appeals for the Second Circuit affirming Grenada's position in 2012. Taiwan subsequently negotiated a settlement under which approximately US$36.6 million of Grenada's debt was restructured, including a 50% reduction in principal, a 15-year repayment period, and a hurricane-related payment suspension clause.

In a 2021 analysis, Caribbean scholar Rasheed Griffith examined Taiwan's response to Grenada's decision. Griffith characterized the episode as an instance in which Taiwan "weaponised" a bilateral loan contract against a financially devastated former partner and a particularly hard-edged example of the use of sovereign lending as an instrument of diplomatic retaliation.

== Taiwan's foreign relations with Caribbean countries ==
Relations between Taiwan and the Caribbean
Sovereign states

- Antigua and Barbuda–Taiwan relations
- (The Bahamas) Bahamas–Taiwan relations
- Barbados–Taiwan relations
- Cuba–Taiwan relations
- Dominica–Taiwan relations
- Dominican Republic–Taiwan relations
- Grenada–Taiwan relations
- Haiti–Taiwan relations
- Jamaica–Taiwan relations
- Saint Kitts and Nevis–Taiwan relations
- Saint Lucia–Taiwan relations
- Saint Vincent and the Grenadines–Taiwan relations
- Taiwan–Trinidad and Tobago relations

== See also ==
- Foreign relations of Taiwan
- Taiwan–Latin America relations
- China–Caribbean relations
- One-China policy
