= Taiwan–Africa relations =

Bilateral relations between Taiwan and African states

- AU: Taiwan

Africa

Taiwan

Taiwan–Africa relations refers to the diplomatic, economic, and informal relations between Taiwan (formally the Republic of China, ROC) and countries in Africa. Since 1949, competition between Taiwan and People's Republic of China (PRC) for diplomatic recognition has shaped Taiwan's engagement with African countries.

During the Cold War, Taiwan maintained formal diplomatic relations with a significant number of African countries. However, following the PRC's assumption of China's seat at the United Nations in 1971 and the global shift toward recognition of Beijing, Taiwan's official presence in Africa declined. As of 2026, Eswatini and the self-declared Republic of Somaliland are the only two African countries to have official relations with Taiwan, although Eswatini is the only African UN member that officially recognizes Taiwan rather than the China.

In addition to official relations, Taiwan maintains representative offices and conducts trade, development assistance, and cultural exchanges with several African countries.

== Loans and enforcement ==
Taiwan has provided loans to African states in support of its diplomatic competition with the People's Republic of China. Some of these loans later became contentious after recipient governments shifted recognition to Beijing. In 2017, Export–Import Bank of the Republic of China obtained US court judgments against the Democratic Republic of the Congo and the Central African Republic for a combined $212 million in unpaid loans and interest, while pursuing a further claim of at least $49.2 million against Guinea-Bissau. The cases attracted criticism because they involved some of Africa's poorest and most politically unstable states. Analysts also suggested that Taiwan's pursuit of repayment was motivated in part by retribution against governments that had switched diplomatic allegiance to China, with Atlantic Council analyst Robert Manning describing the litigation to Reuters as intended not only to recover the loans but also as "a bit of retribution."

== Taiwan's foreign relations with African countries ==
Relations between Taiwan and Africa

- Algeria–Taiwan relations
- Angola–Taiwan relations
- Benin–Taiwan relations
- Botswana–Taiwan relations
- Burkina Faso–Taiwan relations
- Burundi–Taiwan relations
- Cameroon–Taiwan relations
- Cape Verde–Taiwan relations
- Central African Republic–Taiwan relations
- Chad–Taiwan relations
- Comoros–Taiwan relations
- Democratic Republic of the Congo–Taiwan relations
- Republic of the Congo–Taiwan relations
- Djibouti–Taiwan relations
- Egypt–Taiwan relations
- Equatorial Guinea–Taiwan relations
- Eritrea–Taiwan relations
- Eswatini–Taiwan relations
- Ethiopia–Taiwan relations
- Gabon–Taiwan relations
- (The Gambia) Gambia–Taiwan relations
- Ghana–Taiwan relations
- Guinea–Taiwan relations
- Guinea-Bissau–Taiwan relations
- Ivory Coast–Taiwan relations
- Kenya–Taiwan relations
- Lesotho–Taiwan relations
- Liberia–Taiwan relations
- Libya–Taiwan relations
- Madagascar–Taiwan relations
- Malawi–Taiwan relations
- Mali–Taiwan relations
- Mauritania–Taiwan relations
- Mauritius–Taiwan relations
- Morocco–Taiwan relations
- Mozambique–Taiwan relations
- Namibia–Taiwan relations
- Niger–Taiwan relations
- Nigeria–Taiwan relations
- Rwanda–Taiwan relations
- São Tomé and Príncipe–Taiwan relations
- Senegal–Taiwan relations
- Seychelles–Taiwan relations
- Sierra Leone–Taiwan relations
- Somalia–Taiwan relations
- South Africa–Taiwan relations
- South Sudan–Taiwan relations
- Sudan–Taiwan relations
- Taiwan–Tanzania relations
- Taiwan–Togo relations
- Taiwan–Tunisia relations
- Taiwan–Uganda relations
- Taiwan–Zambia relations
- Taiwan–Zimbabwe relations

== See also ==
- Foreign relations of Taiwan
- Cross-Strait relations
- China–Africa relations
- Taiwan–Caribbean relations
