= China–Venezuela relations =

- China: Venezuela

China–Venezuela relations are the international relations between the People's Republic of China and the Bolivarian Republic of Venezuela. Formal diplomatic relations between both countries were established in August 1944 and switched recognition to the PRC in 1974. Before 1999 only one sitting president, Luis Herrera Campins, had visited China. Cooperation began growing significantly during the Presidency of Hugo Chávez of the Bolivarian Republic of Venezuela and the tenure of Jiang Zemin and Hu Jintao as the General Secretary of the Chinese Communist Party. In 2016, China-Venezuelan trade amounted to $7.42 billion, with $4.9 billion coming from Venezuelan exports and $2.52 billion coming from Chinese exports.

== History ==
=== Early years (1944–1999) ===
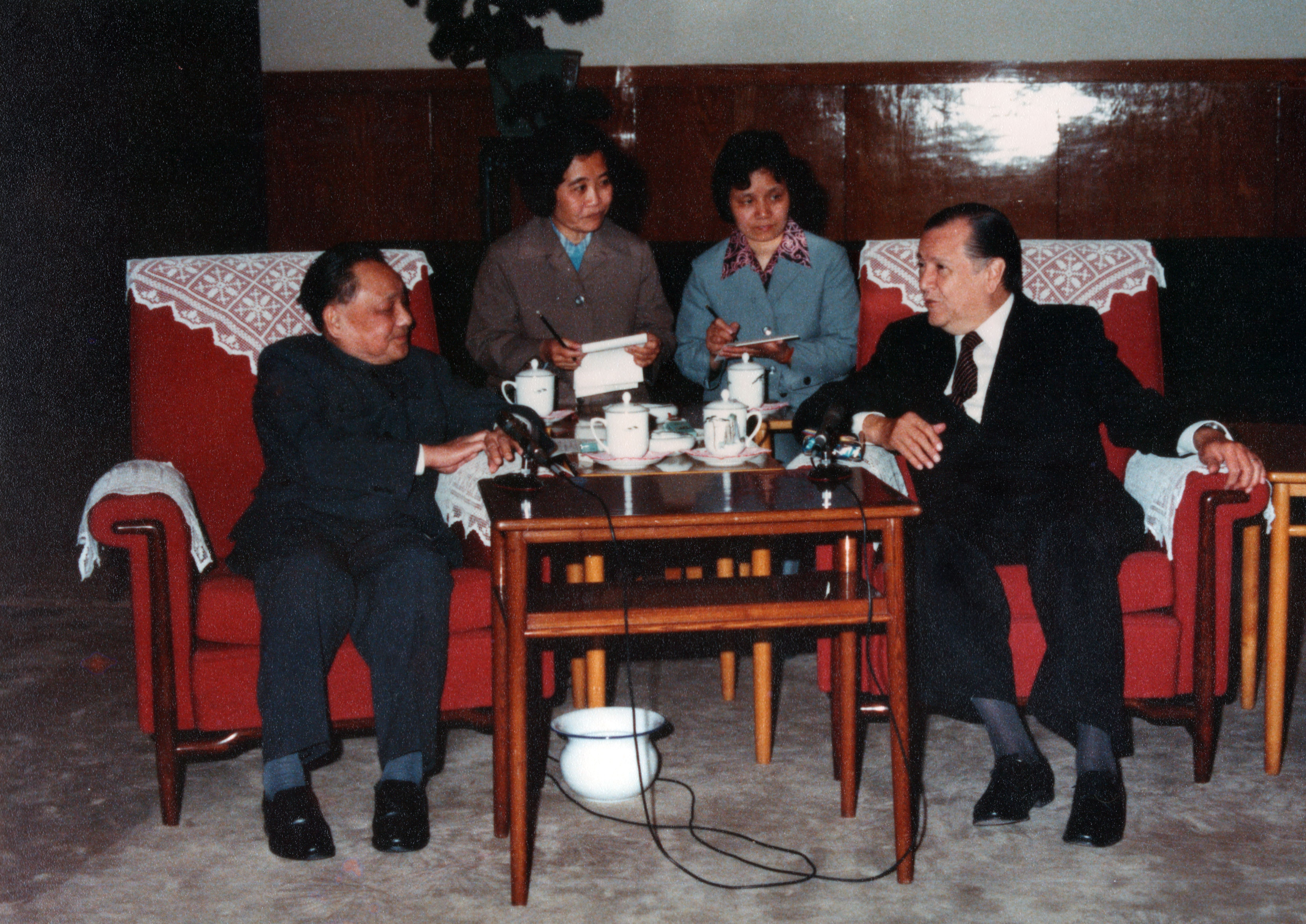
Former President Rafael Caldera meeting with Chinese leader Deng Xiaoping in 1981.

Formal diplomatic relations between the Chinese and Venezuelan governments were established in August 1944, with offices opened in Caracas and Nanking, the capital of the Republic of China. After the Communists taking power in 1949, the Venezuelan office was transplanted from Nanking to Taipei, the capital of Taiwan. In 1966, the office was upgraded into an embassy.

In 1974, Venezuela ended recognition of the ROC and switched to recognizing the People's Republic of China instead. Before 1999, only one sitting Venezuelan president had visited the PRC: Luis Herrera Campins, in 1981. As a result, up until 1999 there had only been 19 formal agreements between China and Venezuela, and only two of these would be ratified by both sides.

=== Chávez administration (1999-2013) ===
The nature of China-Venezuelan relations completely changed once Hugo Chávez won the 1998 Venezuelan Presidential elections.

From the outset of his presidency, Hugo Chávez sought to distance himself from the United States and court other allies that could help him find alternative sources of trade, diplomatic and military relations. During the first year of his presidency, he visited China and would accumulate the greatest number of visits to China out of any other Latin-American leader during the same period (1999–2012). While giving a speech at Beijing University, Chávez is reported to have stated that “the Bolivarian Revolution is rooted in the ideology of Communist China's founder, CCP Chairman Mao Zedong”. During that same visit, Chávez also proclaimed that Simon Bolivar was a “soul mate of Mao Zedong”.

While China-Venezuelan relations were not strong at the time of Hugo Chávez's 1999 election, by his third term in 2012 the alliance between these socialist regimes were stronger than ever before. In terms of their diplomatic ties, Venezuela became a supporter of China on issues relating to Iran and North Korea; and they also publicly supported the creation of an international currency, which is a position that China favored.

Chavez has been called a 'strong and vibrant leader' and 'good friend of the Chinese people.'

=== Maduro administration (2013-2026) ===
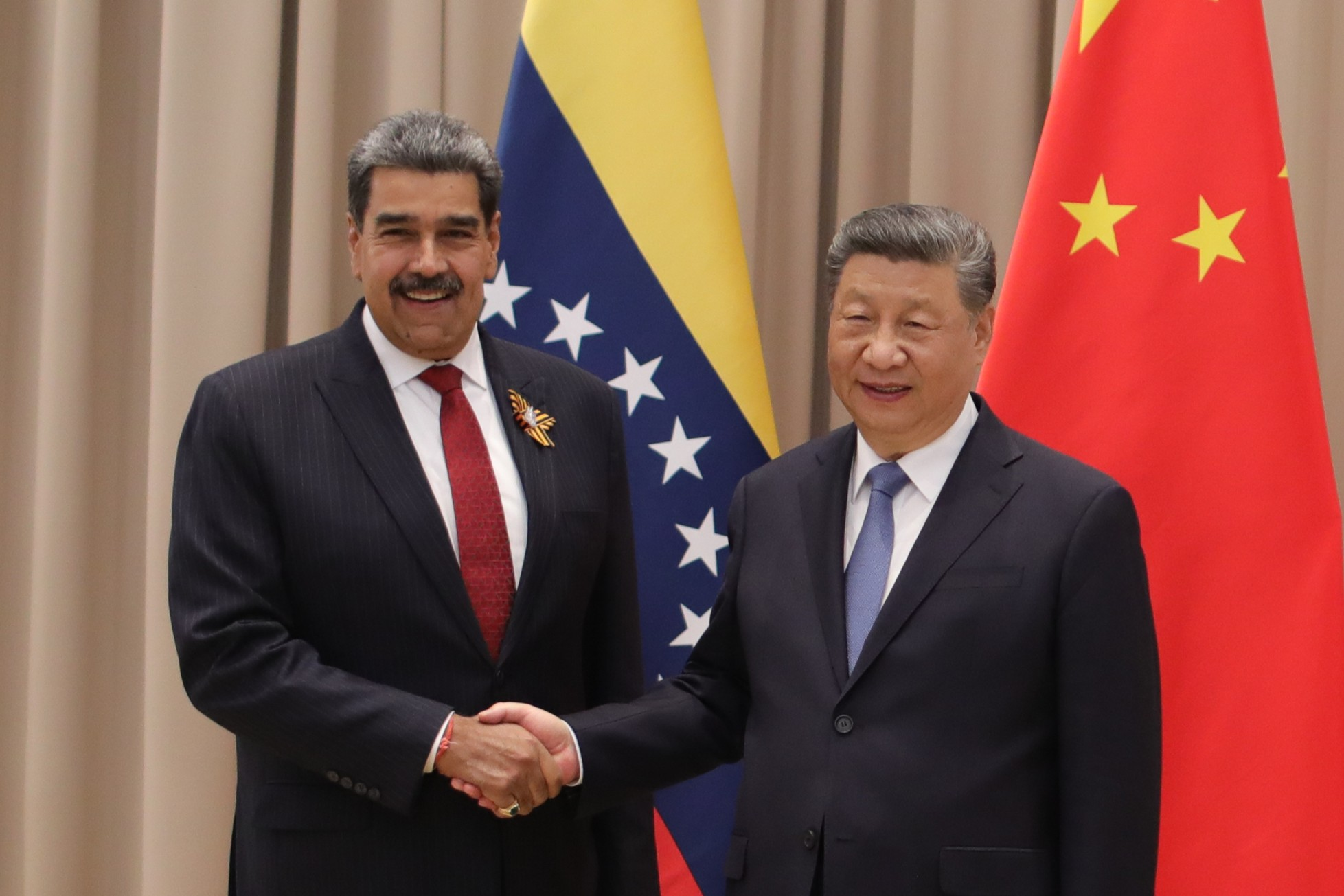
President Nicolás Maduro shaking hands with Chinese leader Xi Jinping in 2025.

In March 2013, Hugo Chávez died. In April, a special presidential election was held in which Chávez's vice president Nicolás Maduro won.

In 2017, the Supreme Tribunal of Venezuela removed power from the elected National Assembly, resulting in a constitutional crisis and protests that year. Maduro called for a rewrite of the constitution, and the Constituent Assembly of Venezuela was elected in 2017, under what many—including Venezuela's chief prosecutor Luisa Ortega and Smartmatic, the company that ran the voting machines—considered irregular voting conditions; the majority of its members were pro-Maduro. On 20 May 2018, presidential elections were called prematurely; opposition leaders had been jailed, exiled or forbidden to run, there was no international observation, and tactics were used to suggest voters could lose their jobs or social welfare if they did not vote for Maduro. While the majority of nations in the Western world did not recognize the Constituent Assembly election or the validity of Maduro's 2018 reelection, and the Canadian, Panamanian, and the United States governments sanctioned Maduro, China, Russia and other allies recognized the elections and congratulated Maduro for winning.

In January 2019, the opposition-majority National Assembly declared that Maduro's re-election was invalid and declared its president, Juan Guaidó, to be acting president of the Venezuela. The US, Canada, and most of Western Europe and Latin America (including Brazil, Colombia, Argentina) recognized Guaidó as interim president.

However, China and Russia have continued to voice support for Maduro and have accused of the US of interfering in Venezuela's domestic affairs amid the ongoing turmoil. Iran has also condemned US threats, while a few Latin American countries such as Cuba and Bolivia also continue to back the Maduro administration. On the other hand, the ROC was among the several countries to support Juan Guaidó and the opposition-led National Assembly. Through its Twitter account, the Foreign Ministry quoted that "Taiwan stands with the forces of freedom" while calling for "the democratic order to be restored" in Venezuela.

In February 2019, China alongside Russia vetoed a United Nations Security Council resolution calling for new presidential elections in Venezuela.

During the crisis in Venezuela, China supplied riot-control equipment to Venezuelan authorities combatting the protests in Venezuela. According to the Center for Strategic and International Studies, China has also financially assisted Venezuela through its economic crisis.

Maduro made an official state visit to China in September 2023, when he signed an agreement that included the training of Venezuelan astronauts, expressing his wish to send Venezuelans to the Moon. China supported Maduro's claim of victory in the contested 2024 Venezuelan presidential election. In August 2025, China deployed the Liaowang, a Type 815 spy ship, to the Gulf of Paria to monitor U.S. military activity.

Maduro used Huawei phones numerous times to symbolize the strategic partnership between China and Venezuela.

On 19 November 2025, amidst a United States naval deployment in the Caribbean, Chinese foreign ministry spokesperson Mao Ning said that China opposes "any interference in Venezuela's internal affairs under any pretext" and called on the United States to "choose a course of action conducive to peace and stability". On 25 November, while sending a congratulatory message to President Maduro, Chinese leader Xi Jinping stated that China supports Venezuela in "safeguarding its sovereignty and national security, the dignity of the nation, and social stability" and "resolutely opposes the meddling of external forces in Venezuela’s internal affairs under any pretext".

On 3 January 2026, the United States carried out several strikes in Venezuela and detained and abducted President Maduro. China condemned the operation and called for Maduro's release. The strikes came a day after Maduro received a Chinese delegation on 2 January which included Special Representative of the Chinese Government on Latin American Affairs, Qiu Xiaoqi.

== Trade and investments (1999-present) ==
In 2001, Venezuela was the first Hispanic country to enter a 'strategic development partnership' with China.

From 2003 until 2012, China-Venezuelan economic ties grew exponentially stronger. The amount of bilateral trade between China and Venezuela expanded about 24-fold from $742,417,000 in 2003 to $20 billion in 2012. Moreover, during this same time period, Venezuela became China's fourth largest supplier of oil.

The two countries established the China-Venezuela Joint Fund in 2007. The China Development Bank lent the fund $4 billion and the Venezuelan Economic and Social Development Bank (BANDES) contributed $2 billion. The fund's goal is to offer capital for infrastructure projects in Venezuela to be built by Chinese companies.

In April 2010, China agreed to extend $20 billion in loans to Venezuela.

Venezuela outlined the role of the venture as one which would link Venezuela's oil producing regions and agricultural farming areas. In September 2009 Venezuela announced a new $16bn deal with China to drill for oil in a joint venture with PDVSA to produce 450,000 barrels per day (72,000 m^{3}/d) of extra heavy crude. Hugo Chávez stated that "In addition, there will be a flood of technology into the country, with China going to build drilling platforms, oil rigs, railroads, houses."

When Venezuela experienced economic distress, China was unable to secure either a return on its loans or the full amount of oil imports Venezuela had promised. China did not attempt to accumulate any Venezuelan assets even when it was clear Venezuela could not resume payment. China instead became unwilling to risk additional investment.

=== Oil ===
Although Venezuela has the greatest amount of oil reserves outside of the Middle East, the type of oil it produces, its geographical location, and its relationship with the US inhibited Chavez's administration's ability to increase oil exports to China.

The biggest obstacle Chávez faced in exporting Venezuelan oil to China was due to the fact that during the early 2000s, China did not have the machinery in their refineries capable of processing the highly sulfurous Venezuelan oil. This meant that the only oil that China was interested in importing was a specific type of low-grade oil called “orimulsion” which was mainly used to make asphalt.

Another factor that constrained Venezuela's ability to export its oil to China was the size of Venezuela's oil shipment tankers. The tankers were simply too big to fit through the Panama Canal and would have to take a longer route that traversed the Cape of Good Hope, South Africa.

The final obstacle to the exportation of oil was a diplomatic one. Since about 60 percent of Venezuela's oil exports were going to the United States, Chinese officials were worried that by buying more oil that they would become involved in the disputes between Chavez's anti-US regime and the Bush administration. Because of these factors, in 2005, Venezuela was only exporting 140,000 barrels of crude orimulsion per day. In addition, Venezuela made up only 2 percent of China's imports and exports in 2003.

In September 2008, Venezuela signed a series of energy co-operation deals with China with Hugo Chávez stating that oil exports could rise threefold by 2012, to 1 million barrels per day (160,000 m^{3}/d). However, by 2012, underinvestment in the oil sector meant that only 640,000 barrels of oil a day were exported to China and 200,000 of those simply went to service Venezuela's huge debts to China. During the first quarter of 2018, only 381,300 barrels of oil were being exported.

In February 2009, Venezuela and China agreed to double their joint investment fund to $12 billion and signed agreements to boost co-operation which include increasing oil exports from Venezuela, China's fourth biggest oil provider. An oil refinery is planned be built in China to handle Venezuelan heavy crude from the Orinoco basin. "It is part of a strategic alliance" Venezuelan President Hugo Chávez said, after meeting the visiting Chinese Vice President Xi Jinping who stated that "our co-operation is highly beneficial".

On 19 October 2018, Maduro promised to raise oil exports to China and Russia to one million barrels a day, 'rain or shine'.

=== Infrastructure, tech, and industry ===
In 2009, China entered into a partnership with Venezuela to launch a railway company in Venezuela which will be 40% controlled by the China Railways Engineering Corporation (CREC) and the remainder by Venezuela.

In 2012, Chang Zhenming (常振明), president of CITIC group, signed a number of mining contracts, for the research and exploration of iron, gold, bauxite, torio (potential as nuclear fuel), etc. reserves in Venezuela.

In September 2013, China decided to lend $50bn over 5 years to finance 201 housing projects in Venezuela.

In 2016, during Nicolás Maduro's presidency and the worsening of the Venezuelan crisis, the government launched the Local Committees for Supply and Production (CLAP) program to distribute subsidized food packages and hired Soltein SA de CV, a company based in Mexico, to design an online platform to track them. Wanting to learn further about beneficiaries, the government asked ZTE help to develop QR codes for the "homeland cards". ZTE developed the codes at a cost of less than $3 per account, and the government printed the cards, linking them to the Soltein database.

In 2008, China also launched a communication satellite Venesat-1 for Venezuela, which has since become inactive. They also a signed a deal with Orinico to update the mining map of Venezuela.

==== Satellite tracking stations ====
China operates two satellite tracking stations in Venezuela. Chinese state-owned China Great Wall Industry Corporation built the El Sombrero satellite tracking station at the Captain Manuel Ríos Aerospace Base and another at Luepa, Bolívar.

== Human rights ==
In June 2020, Venezuela was one of 53 countries that backed the Hong Kong national security law at the United Nations.

== New Silk Road ==
Countries which signed cooperation documents related to the Belt and Road Initiative

Venezuela joined the Belt and Road Initiative (BRI) in 2018.

Of the $150 billion the Chinese Development Bank loaned to Latin America in the past 12 years, a third went to Venezuela.

== Military ==
Venezuela's military equipment is mostly of Chinese and Russian origin. Military relations between the two countries increased under Chávez. During Chávez's administration, China started selling various military products, such as radars and aircraft, and also began performing bilateral military training activities in Venezuela. According to a 2019 report China has sold $615 million in weapons in the past ten years.

== Emigration ==
As of 2017, Maduro estimates that there are 500,000 Chinese immigrants living in Venezuela, nearly a ten-fold increase since 2000.

== Resident diplomatic missions ==
of China in Venezuela

- Caracas (Embassy)

of Venezuela in China

- Beijing (Embassy)
- Guangzhou (Consulate-General)
- Hong Kong (Consulate-General)
- Shanghai (Consulate-General)

== See also ==
- China–Latin America relations
- Chinese Venezuelans
- Taiwan–Venezuela relations
- VIT, C.A.
