= Libya–Taiwan relations =

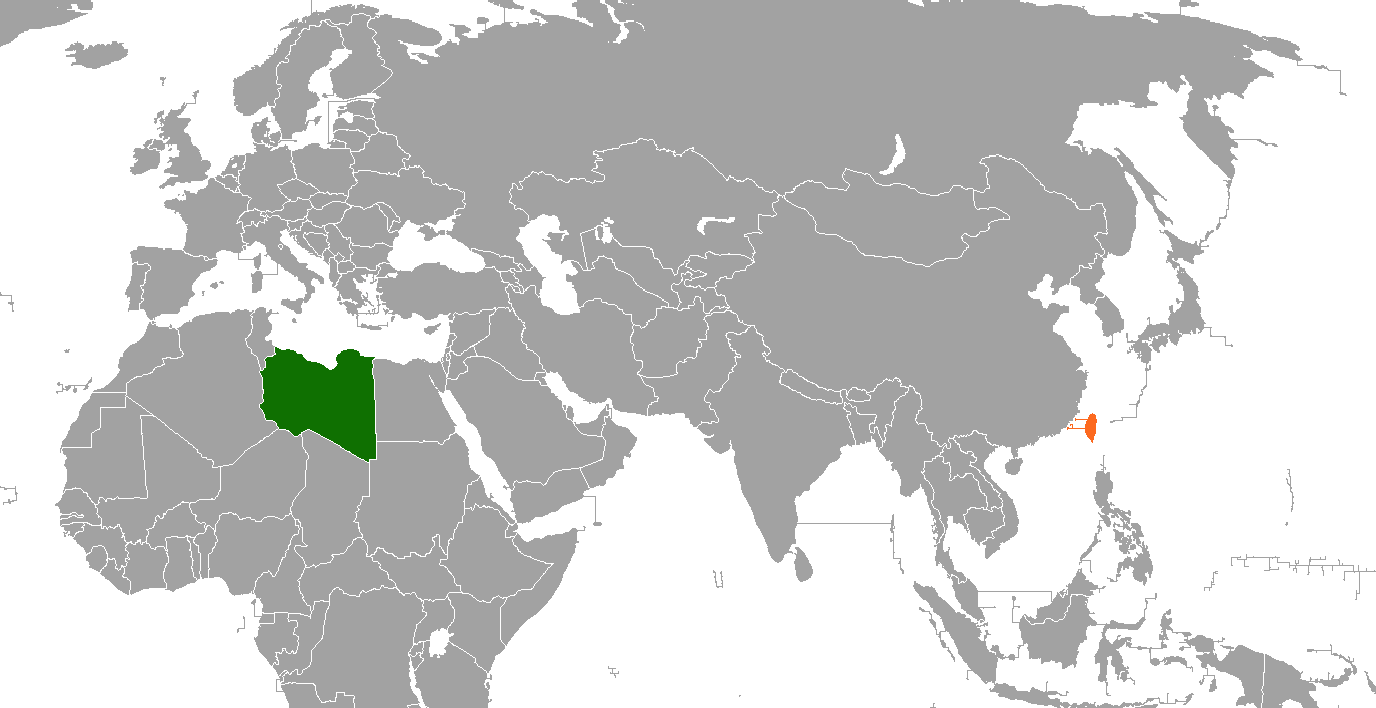

- Libya: Taiwan

Libya–Taiwan relations refers to bilateral relations between Taiwan and Libya. Relations began in 1959 and continued on and off until the First Libyan Civil War.

== History ==
Diplomatic relations between Taiwan and Libya were established in 1959.

In 1961, Taiwan sent a team of medical professionals to Libya, this was Taiwan's first attempt at medical diplomacy.

In 1979, Libya broke off formal diplomatic relations with Taiwan when they established relations with China, the Taiwanese embassy was replaced with the Taiwan Commercial Office in Tripoli which was closed in 1997 under Chinese pressure.

In 2006, Saif al-Islam Gaddafi traveled to Taiwan and met with Taiwanese President Chen Shui-bian amidst a warming of relations. The two promised a reopening of the trade office. The trade office reopened in 2008. Following Gaddafi's trip the Taiwanese government denied reports that they had agreed to supply Libya with weapons and communications equipment.

The trade office closed in 2011 as a result of the First Libyan Civil War.

== See also ==
- Wen-chin Ouyang
- Fu Hsing Kang College
