= Marshall Islands–Taiwan relations =

- Taiwan: Marshall Islands

Diplomatic mission
- Embassy of the Marshall Islands, Taipei: Embassy of Taiwan, Majuro

Envoy
- Ambassador Anjanette Kattil: Ambassador Steve Hsia

Marshall Islands–Taiwan relations refers to bilateral relations between the Marshall Islands and Taiwan. Diplomatic relations began in 1998, and both have diplomatic missions in each others' capitals.

== History ==
In 1979, Marshall Islands began contact with the Taiwanese government as the country ratifies its constitution in anticipation of independence. However, unofficial relations ended by 1988 as Marshall Islands decided to conduct relations instead with the People's Republic of China.

On 20 November 1998, Taiwanese foreign minister Jason Hu met with his Marshallese counterpart Phillip Muller, where they signed a joint communiqué for mutual diplomatic recognition and the establishment of relations.

On 5 December 1998, Taiwan established its embassy in the Marshallese capital of Majuro. Then on 7 October 1999, Marshall Islands established its embassy in Taipei, and sent its first ambassador in May 2002.

== List of signed agreements ==
The following is a list of signed bilateral agreements between the two governments:

Date	Agreement	Notes
13 August 1979	Agreement on Agricultural Technical Cooperation 《農業技術合作協定》	(Note: Amended: 16 February 1982, 27 August 1984, 5 May 1986, 25 November 1988; Extended: 16 February 1982, 22 February 1984, 5 May 1986, 25 November 1988, 31 August 2009, 22 March 2022)
10 February 1999	Air Services Agreement 《空運服務合作協定》	
1 May 1999	Agreement on the Promotion and Reciprocal Protection of Investments 《投資促進暨保護協定》	
17 May 2002	Joint Communiqué 《中華民國與馬紹爾群島共和國之聯合公報》	
9 October 2003	Agreement on ICDF-Taiwan Volunteers 《關於國際合作發展基金會志工之協定 》	
1 December 2004	Agreement on Cooperation in Health 《衛生合作協定》	
14 April 2006	Agreement Concerning Cooperation in the Exchange of Intelligence Related to Money Laundering 《洗錢情報交換合作協定》	
28 July 2008	Memorandum of Understanding Regarding the Establishment of a Taiwan Health Center in the Republic of the Marshall Islands 《設立臺灣衛生中心瞭解備忘錄》	
12 April 2011	Instrument of Ratification on the Treaty of Extradition 《引渡條約》	
30 October 2017	Memorandum of Understanding on ROC-RMI Presidents' Scholarship Fund 《設立臺馬總統獎助學金基金瞭解備忘錄》	
30 October 2017	Memorandum of Understanding Concerning Cooperation in Immigration Affairs and Human Trafficking Prevention 《有關移民事務與防制人口販運合作瞭解備忘錄》	
27 July 2018	Agreement on Coast Guard Cooperation 《海巡合作協定》	
27 July 2018	Agreement on the Mutual Waiver of Visa Requirements 《國民互免簽證協定》	
20 November 2018	Agreement on Police Cooperation 《警政合作協定》	
20 November 2018	Agreement on Strategic Cooperation and Training 《戰略合作暨夥伴關係架構》	
3 January 2019	Agreement for Cooperation on Austronesian Peoples Cultural Affairs 《南島民族文化事務合作協定》	
13 April 2023	Diplomatic Staff Training Cooperation Agreement 《外交人員訓練及交流合作協定》	

== Trade relations ==
Trade volume between Marshall Islands and Taiwan (in USD)
Year	Trade volume	Annual change	Ranking	Taiwan→Marshall Islands	Annual change	Ranking	Marshall Islands→Taiwan	Annual change	Ranking
2022	438,579,961	▲395.92%	63	438,570,564	▲396.21%	46	9,397	▼82.67%	209
2023	243,296,936	▼44.526%	70	243,125,176	▼44.564%	50	171,760	▲1727.817%	172
2024	133,910,288	▼44.96%	77	133,887,678	▼44.931%	61	22,610	▼86.836%	200

=== Trade products ===
- Taiwan → Marshall Islands: woven nets made of wire, rope or cable, salt, radar appliances, automatic data processing machines, other steel products, drinking water
- Marshall Islands → Taiwan: frozen fish, scrap copper, recycling materials
