= List of diplomatic missions in Libya =

This is a list of diplomatic missions in Libya. Due to the Libyan Crisis, several countries have closed their embassies in Tripoli.

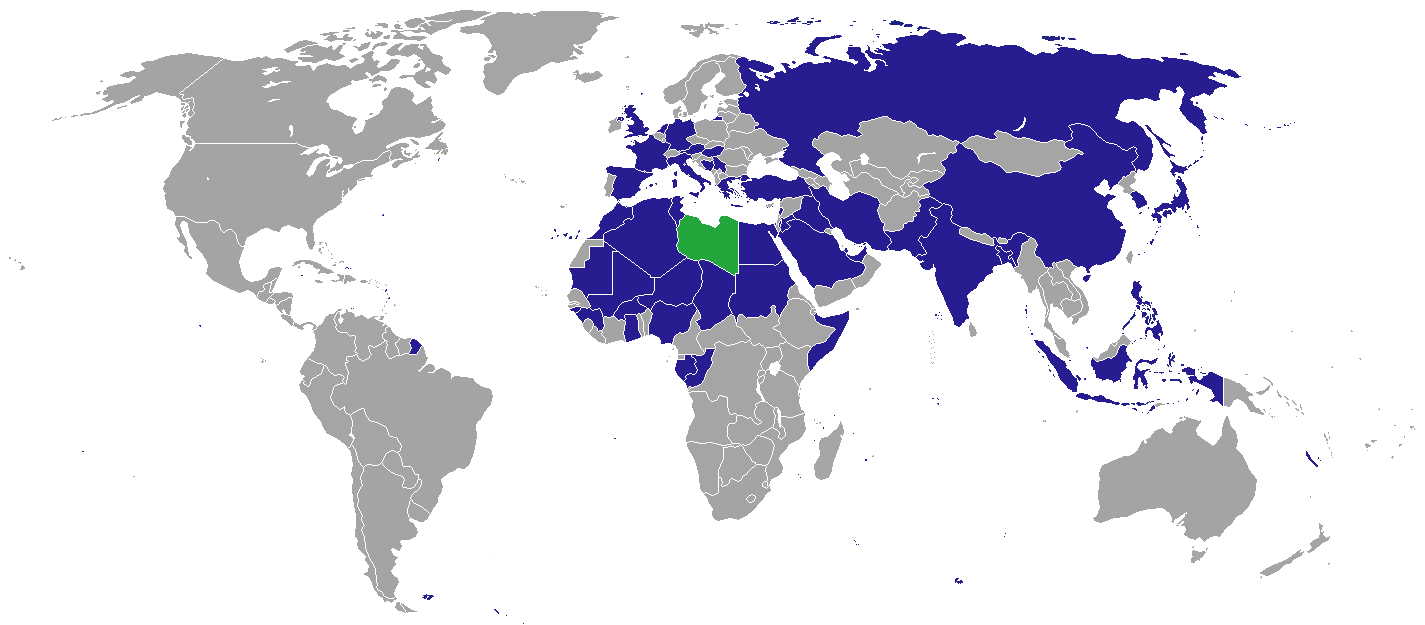
Map of diplomatic missions in Libya

== Diplomatic missions in Tripoli ==
=== Embassies ===
1. Algeria
2. Austria
3. Bangladesh
4. Bosnia and Herzegovina
5. Burkina Faso
6. Chad
7. China
8. Congo-Brazzaville
9. Congo-Kinshasa
10. Egypt
11. Eritrea
12. France
13. Gabon
14. Germany
15. Ghana
16. Greece
17. Guinea
18. Guinea-Bissau
19. Hungary
20. India
21. Indonesia
22. Iran
23. Iraq
24. Italy
25. Japan
26. Jordan
27. Kuwait
28. Lebanon
29. Mali
30. Mauritania
31. Malta
32. Morocco
33. Netherlands
34. Niger
35. Nigeria
36. Pakistan
37. Palestine
38. Philippines
39. Qatar
40. Russia
41. Saudi Arabia
42. Serbia
43. Somalia
44. South Korea
45. Spain
46. Sudan
47. Syria
48. Tunisia
49. Turkey
50. United Arab Emirates
51. United Kingdom
52. Yemen

=== Other missions or delegations ===
- European Union (Delegation)

=== Gallery ===
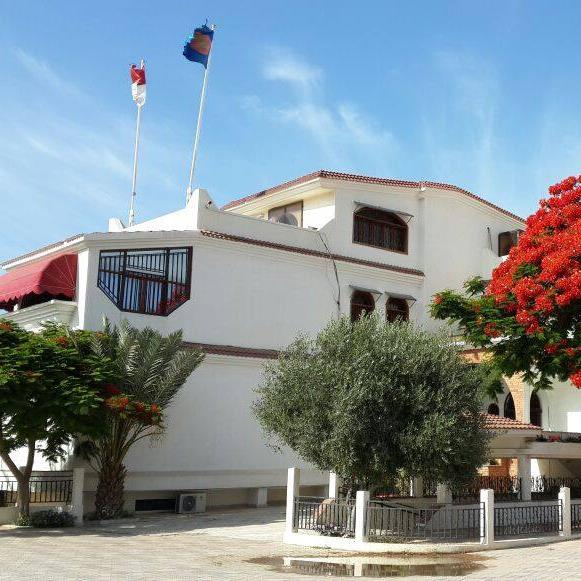
Embassy of Indonesia

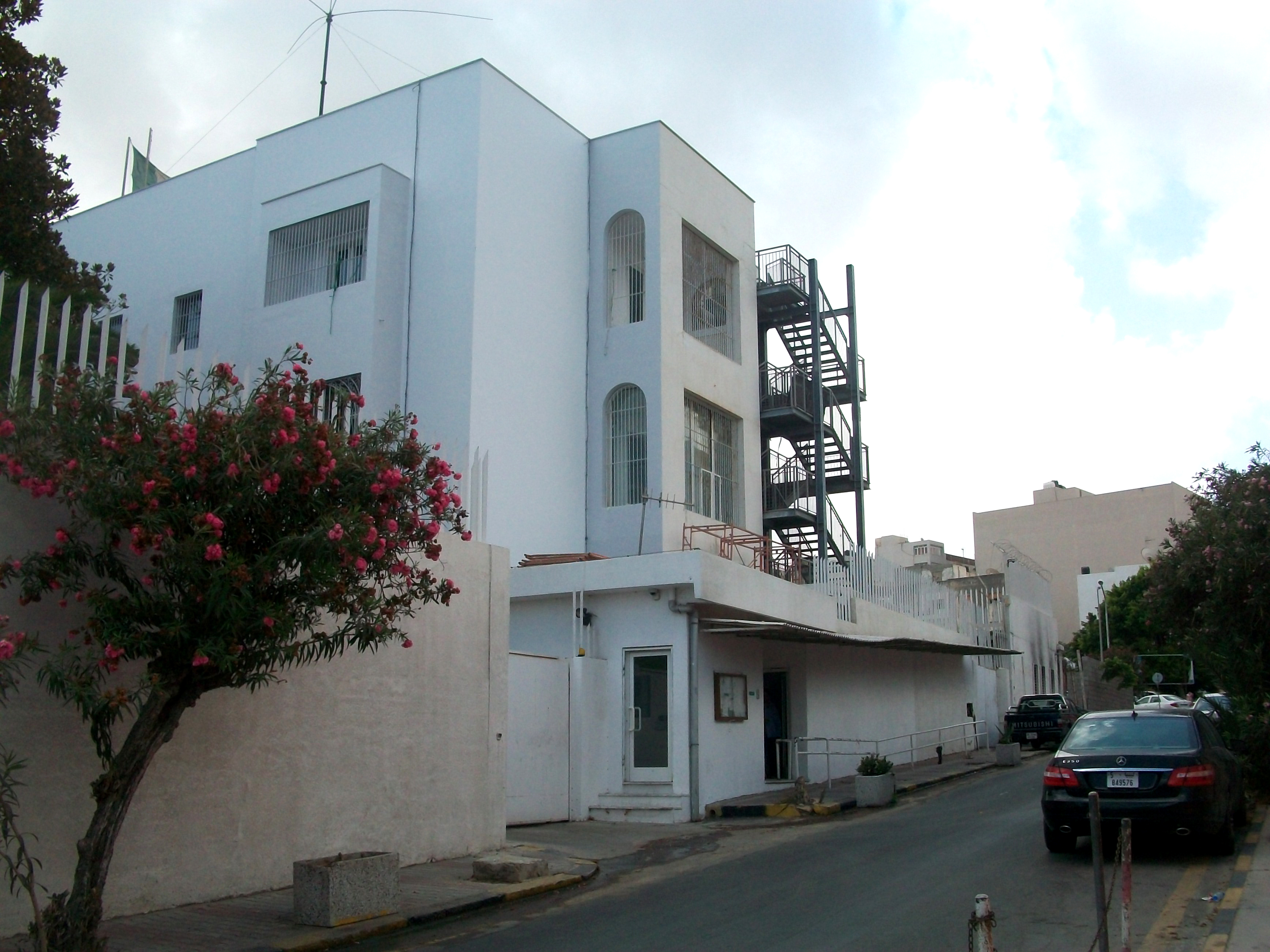
Embassy of Italy

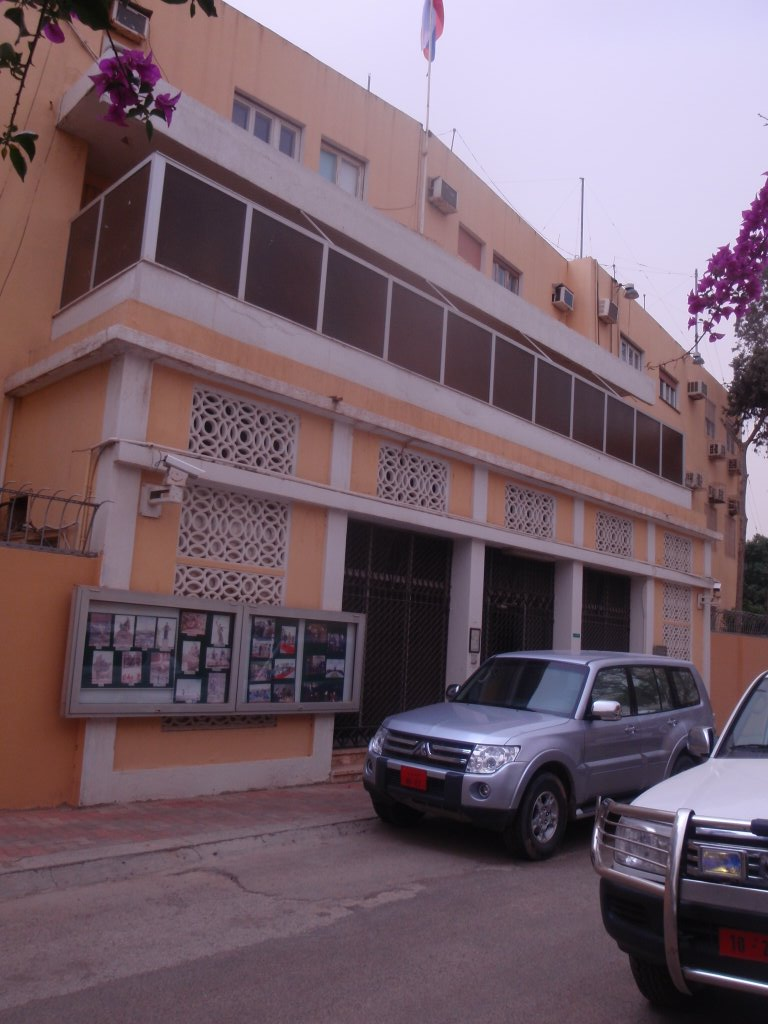
Embassy of Russia

== Consular missions ==
The following major cities are host to career consular missions of the sending countries listed therein. All missions are assumed to be consulates-general unless indicated otherwise.

=== Benghazi ===
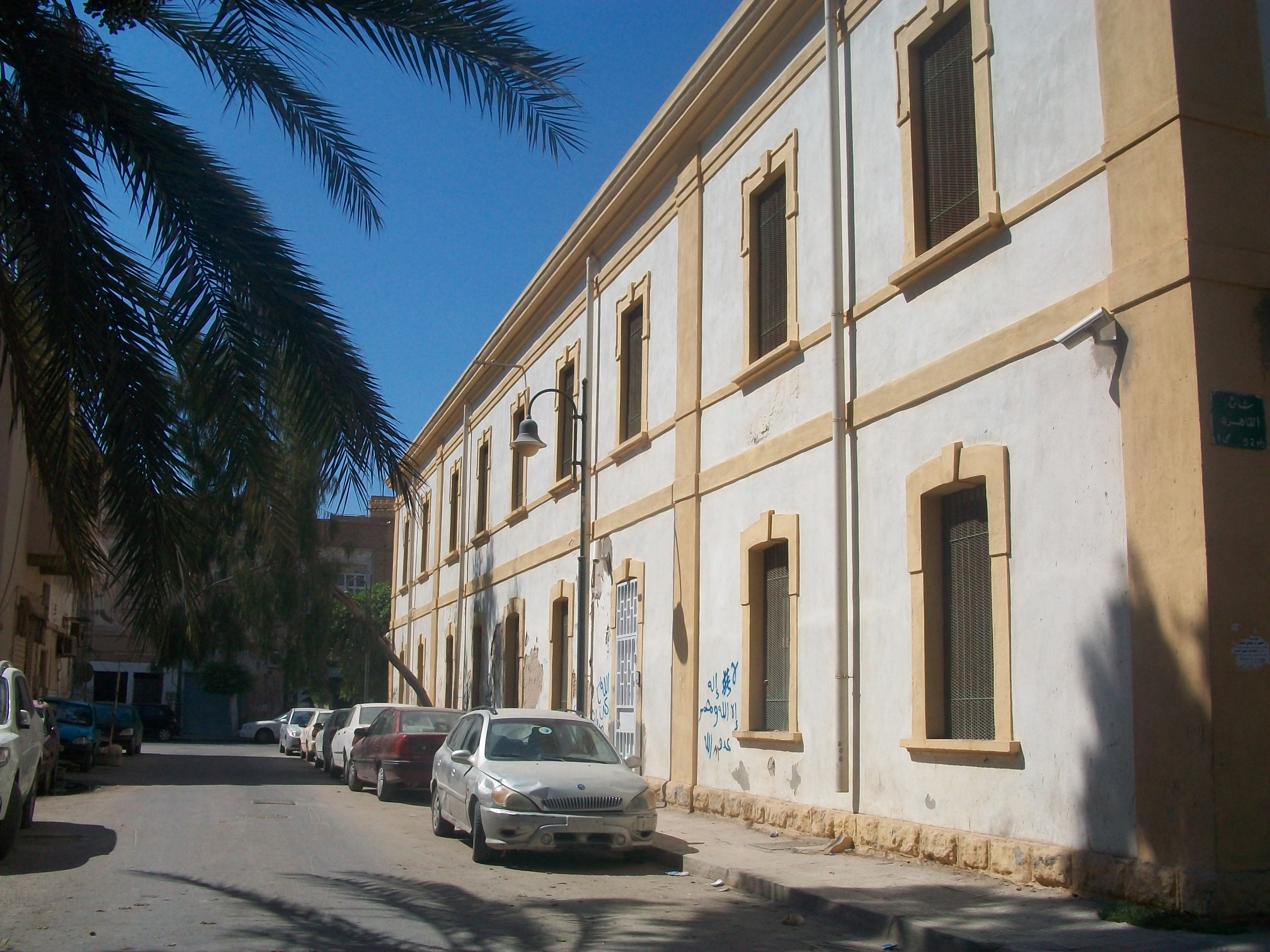
Italian Consulate-General in Benghazi

1. Belarus (Consulate)
2. Chad
3. Egypt
4. Greece
5. Italy
6. Morocco
7. Pakistan
8. Russia
9. Sudan
10. Tunisia
11. Turkey

=== Kufra ===
1. Chad
2. Sudan

=== Misrata ===
1. Turkey

=== Sabha ===
1. Algeria (Consulate)

== Non-resident embassies ==
=== Resident in Algiers, Algeria ===
- Angola
- Madagascar
- Mexico
- Namibia
- Nicaragua
- Peru
- Uganda

=== Resident in Cairo, Egypt ===
- Albania
- Armenia
- Azerbaijan
- Belarus
- Bolivia
- Brunei
- Burundi
- Cambodia
- Colombia
- Chile
- Croatia
- Denmark
- Djibouti
- Ecuador
- Equatorial Guinea
- Ethiopia
- Georgia
- Malawi
- Mozambique
- Nepal
- New Zealand
- North Korea
- Norway
- Panama
- Rwanda
- Singapore
- Slovakia
- South Sudan
- Sri Lanka
- Tanzania
- Uruguay
- Vietnam

=== Resident in Tunis, Tunisia ===
- Argentina
- Belgium
- Brazil
- Bulgaria
- Cameroon
- Canada
- Czechia
- Finland
- Oman
- Poland
- South Africa
- Sweden
- Switzerland
- Ukraine
- United States
- Venezuela

=== Resident Rome, Italy ===
- Australia
- Ireland
- Lithuania
- Thailand

=== Resident in other cities ===
- Botswana (Addis Ababa)
- Gambia (Rabat)
- Holy See (Rabat, Malta)
- Iceland (Reykjavík)
- Laos (Paris)
- Maldives (Riyadh)
- Tonga (Abu Dhabi)

== Closed missions ==
Host city	Sending country	Mission	Year closed	Ref.
Tripoli	Afghanistan	Embassy	Unknown	
Tripoli	Albania	Embassy	Unknown	
Tripoli	Angola	Embassy	Unknown	
Tripoli	Argentina	Embassy (Note: To be reopened)	2018	
Tripoli	Australia	Consulate-General	2011	
Tripoli	Azerbaijan	Embassy	2014	
Tripoli	Bahrain	Embassy	Unknown	
Tripoli	Belarus	Embassy	2014	
Tripoli	Belgium	Embassy	2015	
Tripoli	Benin	Embassy	2015	
Tripoli	Bolivia	Embassy	2011	
Tripoli	Botswana	Embassy	Unknown	
Tripoli	Brazil	Embassy	2014	
Tripoli	Bulgaria	Embassy	Unknown	
Tripoli	Burundi	Embassy	2014	
Tripoli	Cameroon	Embassy	Unknown	
Tripoli	Canada	Embassy	Unknown	
Tripoli	Cape Verde	Embassy	Unknown	
Tripoli	Central African Republic	Embassy	Unknown	
Tripoli	Chile	Embassy	Unknown	
Tripoli	Comoros	Embassy	Unknown	
Tripoli	Croatia	Embassy	2011	
Tripoli	Cuba	Embassy	2011	
Tripoli	Cyprus	Embassy	2014	
Tripoli	Czechia	Embassy	2019	
Tripoli	Denmark	Embassy	2015	
Tripoli	Djibouti	Embassy	Unknown	
Tripoli	Ecuador	Embassy	2011	
Tripoli	Equatorial Guinea	Embassy	Unknown	
Tripoli	Ethiopia	Embassy	Unknown	
Tripoli	Finland	Embassy	2003	
Tripoli	Gambia	Embassy	Unknown	
Tripoli	Holy See	Apostolic Nunciature	Unknown	
Tripoli	Ireland	Embassy	Unknown	
Tripoli	Ivory Coast	Embassy	Unknown	
Tripoli	Kazakhstan	Embassy	Unknown	
Tripoli	Kenya	Embassy	2014	
Tripoli	Lesotho	Embassy	Unknown	
Tripoli	Liberia	Embassy	2011	
Tripoli	Madagascar	Embassy	2013	
Tripoli	Malawi	Embassy	2004	
Tripoli	Malaysia	Embassy	2014	
Tripoli	Mozambique	Embassy	Unknown	
Tripoli	Namibia	Embassy	Unknown	
Tripoli	Nicaragua	Embassy	2011	
Tripoli	North Korea	Embassy	2024	
Tripoli	Norway	Embassy	Unknown	
Tripoli	Oman	Embassy	2014	
Tripoli	Panama	Embassy	Unknown	
Tripoli	Poland	Embassy	2014	
Tripoli	Portugal	Embassy	2014	
Tripoli	Romania	Embassy	2014	
Tripoli	Rwanda	Embassy	Unknown	
Tripoli	Senegal	Embassy	Unknown	
Tripoli	Sierra Leone	Embassy	2014	
Tripoli	Slovakia	Embassy	2011	
Tripoli	South Africa	Embassy	Unknown	
Tripoli	Sri Lanka	Embassy	2011	
Tripoli	Sweden	Embassy	2005	
Tripoli	Switzerland	Embassy	2014	
Tripoli	Taiwan	Commercial Office	2011	
Tripoli	Tanzania	Embassy	Unknown	
Tripoli	Thailand	Embassy (Note: Resident in Rome, Italy)	2014	
Tripoli	Togo	Embassy	2015	
Tripoli	Turkmenistan	Embassy	Unknown	
Tripoli	Uganda	Embassy	Unknown	
Tripoli	Ukraine	Embassy	2015	
Tripoli	United States	Embassy (Note: Under the protecting power of Turkey.)	2014	
Tripoli	Uruguay	Embassy	Unknown	
Tripoli	Uzbekistan	Embassy	Unknown	
Tripoli	Venezuela	Embassy	Unknown	
Tripoli	Vietnam	Embassy	2018	
Tripoli	Zambia	Embassy	Unknown	
Tripoli	Zimbabwe	Embassy	2011	
Bayda	United States	Consulate	1966	
Benghazi	Bulgaria	Consulate	2007	
Benghazi	France	Consulate-General	1984	
Benghazi	Poland	Consulate-General	2006	
Benghazi	United Kingdom	Consulate	2012	
Benghazi	United States	Consulate	1966	
Benghazi	United States	Mission	2014	
Sabha	Niger	Consulate	Unknown	

== Missions to Open ==
=== Tripoli ===
- Argentina (Embassy)
- Azerbaijan (Embassy)
- Bahrain (Embassy)
- Brazil (Embassy)
- Bulgaria (Embassy)
- Cameroon (Embassy)
- Canada (Embassy)
- Cuba (Embassy)
- Czech Republic (Embassy)
- Denmark (Embassy)
- Djibouti (Embassy)
- Ethiopia (Embassy)
- Oman (Embassy)
- Poland (Embassy)
- Portugal (Embassy)
- Romania (Embassy)
- Senegal (Embassy)
- Sierra Leone (Embassy)
- South Africa (Embassy)
- Sweden (Embassy)
- Switzerland (Embassy)
- Tanzania (Embassy)
- Thailand (Embassy)
- Uganda (Embassy)
- Ukraine (Embassy)
- United States (Embassy)
- Venezuela (Embassy)
- Vietnam (Embassy)

=== Benghazi ===
- Syria (Consulate General)

=== Sabha ===
- Chad (Consulate General)
- Turkey (Consulate General)

== See also ==
- Foreign relations of Libya
- List of diplomatic missions of Libya
- Visa policy of Libya
- Visa requirements for Libyan citizens
