= Nicaragua–Taiwan relations =

- Taiwan: Nicaragua

Nicaragua–Taiwan relations are foreign relations between Nicaragua and Taiwan. Nicaragua maintained official diplomatic relations with Taiwan from 1930 to 1985 and again from 1990 to 2021. Relations between Nicaragua and China began in 2021. However, Nicaragua still maintains unofficial relations with Taiwan.

== History ==
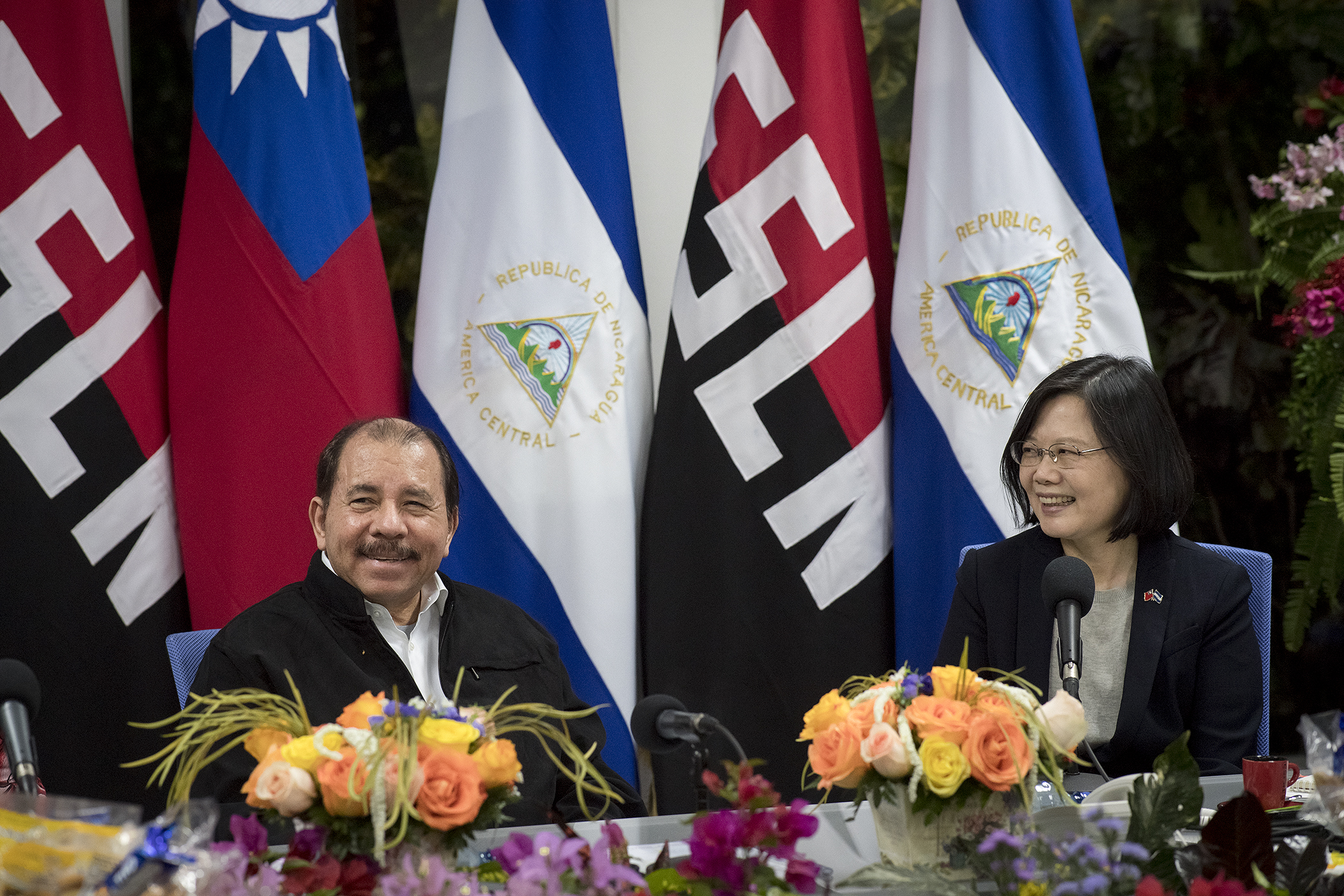
Meeting between Nicaraguan President Daniel Ortega and Taiwanese President Tsai Ing-wen in January 2017.

In 1985, the Nicaraguan government, under Daniel Ortega's administration, first severed official diplomatic ties with Taiwan.

In the 1990 Nicaraguan general election, Ortega was defeated by Violeta Chamorro, who declared the restoration of diplomatic relations with Taiwan. China subsequently severed diplomatic relations.

On 5 August 1997, Nicaraguan President Arnoldo Alemán visited Taiwan.

In honor of the diplomatic relations that were active between the two countries at the time, parks were renamed accordingly: in 1997, "Ji Xian Park" in New Taipei was renamed "Nicaragua Park", while a park in the capital, Managua, was renamed "Taiwan Friendship Park" following renovations completed in 2011..

On 10 December 2021, the government of Nicaragua, under President Daniel Ortega's administration, severed diplomatic relations with Taiwan for the second time.
