= Anjanette Kattil =

Marshallese diplomat

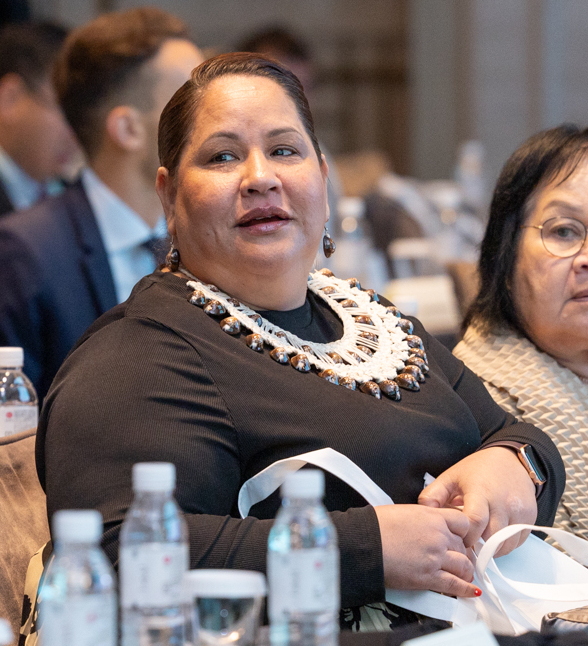
- Kattil in 2023

Marshallese Ambassador to Taiwan
- Incumbent
- Assumed office 30 August 2023

Chinese name
- Traditional Chinese: 卡蒂爾
- Simplified Chinese: 卡蒂尔
Transcriptions
Standard Mandarin
- Hanyu Pinyin: Kǎdì'ěr
- Wade–Giles: K'a^{3}-ti^{4}-erh^{3}

Anjanette Kattil (Chinese: 卡蒂爾; pinyin: Kǎdì'ěr) is a Marshallese diplomat who has served as the country's ambassador to Taiwan (Republic of China) since 2023. She was previously the deputy head of the Marshallese mission to Taiwan from 2016 to 2019.

== Career ==
Kattil was previously an assistant deputy of the Marshallese Ministry of Foreign Affairs.

From 2016 to 2019, she served as the deputy head of the Marshallese mission to Taiwan. During her tenure, she also acted as the mission's chargé d'affaires in the absence of the mission's head.

On 30 August 2023, Kattil became the Marshall Islands' ambassador to Taiwan upon the acceptance of her credentials by then Taiwanese president Tsai Ing-wen. Tsai thanked Kattil for her "longstanding support for Taiwan" and expressed hope for improved bilateral cooperation in several fields, including the environment, medical care, agriculture, and education. Kattil responded by thanking Tsai for her speech and the "warm reception", and pointed to the two countries' history of cooperation and Austronesian connections.

== Personal life ==
During her time posted in Taiwan, Kattil has developed a fondness for local foods and drinks. In a 2024 interview with the magazine Taiwan Panorama, she listed her favourites in Mandarin Chinese: xiaolongbao, shabu-shabu hotpot, beef noodle soup, bubble tea, and Taiwanese coffee.
