= Saint Lucia–Taiwan relations =

- Republic of China: Saint Lucia

Diplomatic mission
- Embassy of St. Lucia, Taipei: Embassy of Taiwan, Gros Islet

Envoy
- Robert Kennedy Lewis: Nicole Su (Su Ying-Chun)

Saint Lucia–Taiwan relations refers to bilateral relations between the Republic of China and Saint Lucia. Relations existed first between 1984 and 1997, and then resumed from 2007 onwards.

== History ==
On 7 May, 1984, the Taiwanese government officially established diplomatic relations with Saint Lucia. A month later on 7 June, Taiwan established an embassy at the St. Lucian capital of Castries. On 29 August, 1997, Saint Lucia established relations with the People's Republic of China, and the Taiwanese government cut ties with St. Lucia shortly afterwards.

On 20 April, 2007, Taiwanese foreign minister James Huang and St. Lucian foreign minister Rufus Bousquet announced the restoration of diplomatic relations between the two countries. On 4 June, 2015, St. Lucia established its embassy in the Taiwanese capital of Taipei.

== List of signed agreements ==
The following is a list of bilateral agreements signed between the two governments:

- 7 May 1984: Agreement on Agricultural Technical Cooperation (農業技術合作協定) (Note: Extended five times: 28 April 1986; 18 April 1988; 28 August 1990; 29 January 1992; 23 June 1994; 4 July 1996. Re-signed on 13 June 2008)
- 7 December 1994: Treaty of Amity (友好條約)
- 17 July 1996: Bilateral Air Services Agreement (空運服務協定)
- 30 April 2007: Joint Communiqué on the Restoration of Relations (恢復外交關係聯合公報)
- 1 September 2009: Agreement on ICDF Volunteers (派遣國際合作發展基金會志工協定)
- 19 March 2014: Information and Communication Technology (ICT) Cooperation Agreement 資訊通信技術合作協定)
- 9 January 2017: Memorandum of Understanding Concerning Cooperation in the Exchange of Financial Intelligence Related to Money Laundering, Associated Predicate Offences and Terrorism Financing (關於涉及洗錢、相關前置犯罪及資助恐怖主義金融情資交換合作瞭解備忘錄)
- 31 January 2018: Agreement on Police Cooperation (警政合作協定)
- 27 November 2019: Cooperation Agreement Regarding the Application of Information and Communication Technology (ICT) for Educational Development (資通訊技術應用於教育發展合作協定(2019-2022)
- 29 October 2022: Framework Agreement on Technical Cooperation (技術合作框架協定)
- 16 August 2023: Treaty on Mutual Legal Assistance in Criminal Matters (刑事司法互助條約)

== Trade relations ==
Trade volume between St. Lucia and Taiwan (in USD)
Year	Trade volume	Annual change	Ranking	Taiwan to St. Lucia	Annual change	Ranking	St. Lucia to Taiwan	Annual change	Ranking
2022	658,441	▲21.10%	198	302,760	▲3.68%	195	355,681	▲41.30%	168
2023	1,273,432	▲93.40%	188	841,409	▲177.91%	176	432,023	▲21.46%	165
2024	999,091	▼21.543%	192	624,713	▼25.754%	182	374,378	▼13.343%	169

=== Exports ===
- Taiwan to St. Lucia: Synthetic fiber fabrics, plastic pipes and accessories, lifting and handling vehicles, measuring equipment, circuit switches, rubber pipes, tires, control instruments and appliances, air pumps and fertilizers
- St. Lucia to Taiwan: Scrap metal, recycled paper, undenatured alcohol, resistors
