= Taipei Commercial Office, Bogotá =

Coordinates: 4.6750761°N 74.0476239°W

Taipei Commercial Office in Bogotá, Colombia 駐哥倫比亞代表處
- Oficina Económica y Cultural de Taipéi en Bogotá, Colombia

Agency overview
- Jurisdiction: Colombia; Panama; Venezuela; Cuba
- Headquarters: Carrera 11 # 93-53, Oficina 501, Bogotá, Colombia
- Agency executive: Victor Sheng-Hung CHU, Representative
- Website: Oficina Comercial de Taipéi en Colombia

The Taipei Commercial Office in Bogotá, Colombia (Chinese: 駐哥倫比亞代表處; pinyin: Zhù Gēlúnbǐyǎ Dàibiǎo Chù) (Spanish: Oficina Comercial de Taipéi en Bogotá, Colombia) represents the interests of Taiwan in Colombia in the absence of formal diplomatic relations, functioning as a de facto embassy.

Until 1980, Colombia recognised Taiwan as the Republic of China, which, in addition to its embassy in Bogotá, had a consulate general in Barranquilla. In that year, it established diplomatic relations with the People's Republic of China.

There is no longer a counterpart organisation in Taipei, although a Colombian Trade Office was established in 1993 and closed in 2002.

The Office is headed by Ms Verónica Chih Yun Kuei (Chinese: 桂志芸; pinyin: Guì Zhìyún; Wade–Giles: Kuei Chih-yün), its Representative as of 2025.

It also has responsibility for relations with Venezuela. These were previously handled by the Oficina Economica de Taipéi in Caracas, established in 1974, but closed in 2009, following tensions with the government of Hugo Chávez, which had close ties with the People's Republic of China and refused to renew the visas of the office's staff.

== See also ==
- List of diplomatic missions of Taiwan
- List of diplomatic missions in Colombia
- Colombia–Taiwan relations
