= Ludmila Vinogradoff =

Chinese-born Venezuelan journalist

- 柳德米拉·維諾格拉多夫
- Born: Ludmila Vinogradoff Sorokin; Shanghai, China
- Citizenship: China; Venezuela; Russia
- Education: Central University of Venezuela
- Occupation: Journalist

Ludmila Vinogradoff Sorokin (Chinese: 柳德米拉·維諾格拉多夫; Russian: Людмила Виноградофф) is a Chinese and Venezuelan journalist. She has worked in several national and international media outlets, including El Nacional, El País, Semana, ABC and Clarín.

== Education ==
Born to a Chinese father and a Russian mother, Ludmila emigrated with her family to Venezuela in search of freedom. She graduated from the Central University of Venezuela and later obtained a postgraduate degree in cinema and mass communication at the School for Advanced Studies in the Social Sciences in Paris, France.

== Career ==
She began her journalistic career at the Venezuelan newspaper El Nacional, covering political and economic topics. Vinogradoff has worked as a journalist for more than 25 years and part of her career has included investigating corruption in Venezuela. She has also been international correspondent in Caracas for the Spanish newspaper El País and the Colombian magazine Semana. She currently works for the Spanish newspaper ABC and the Argentine outlet Clarín.

== Works ==
- El ocaso de Chávez (2016)
