= Kiribati–Taiwan relations =

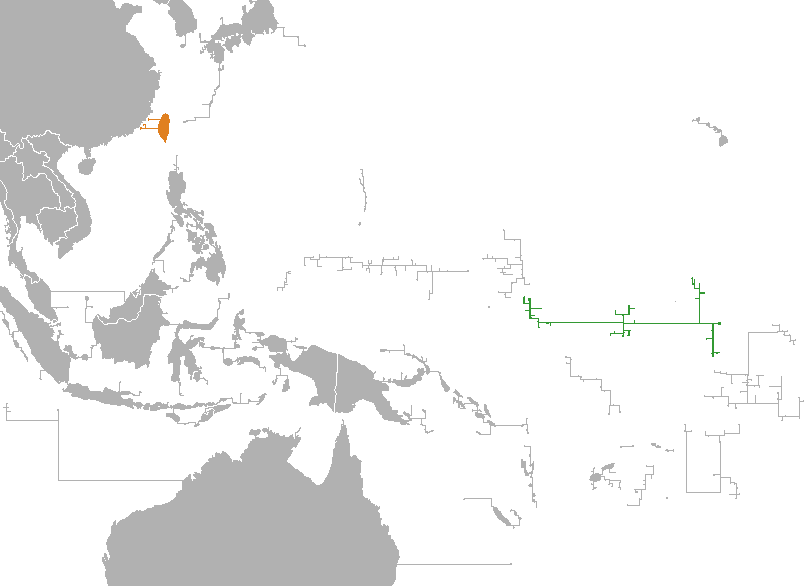

- Kiribati: Taiwan

Kiribati–Taiwan relations refers to relations between Kiribati and Taiwan. Kiribati, under the government of President Taneti Mamau, initially recognised the ROC but switched to PRC later on.

== History ==
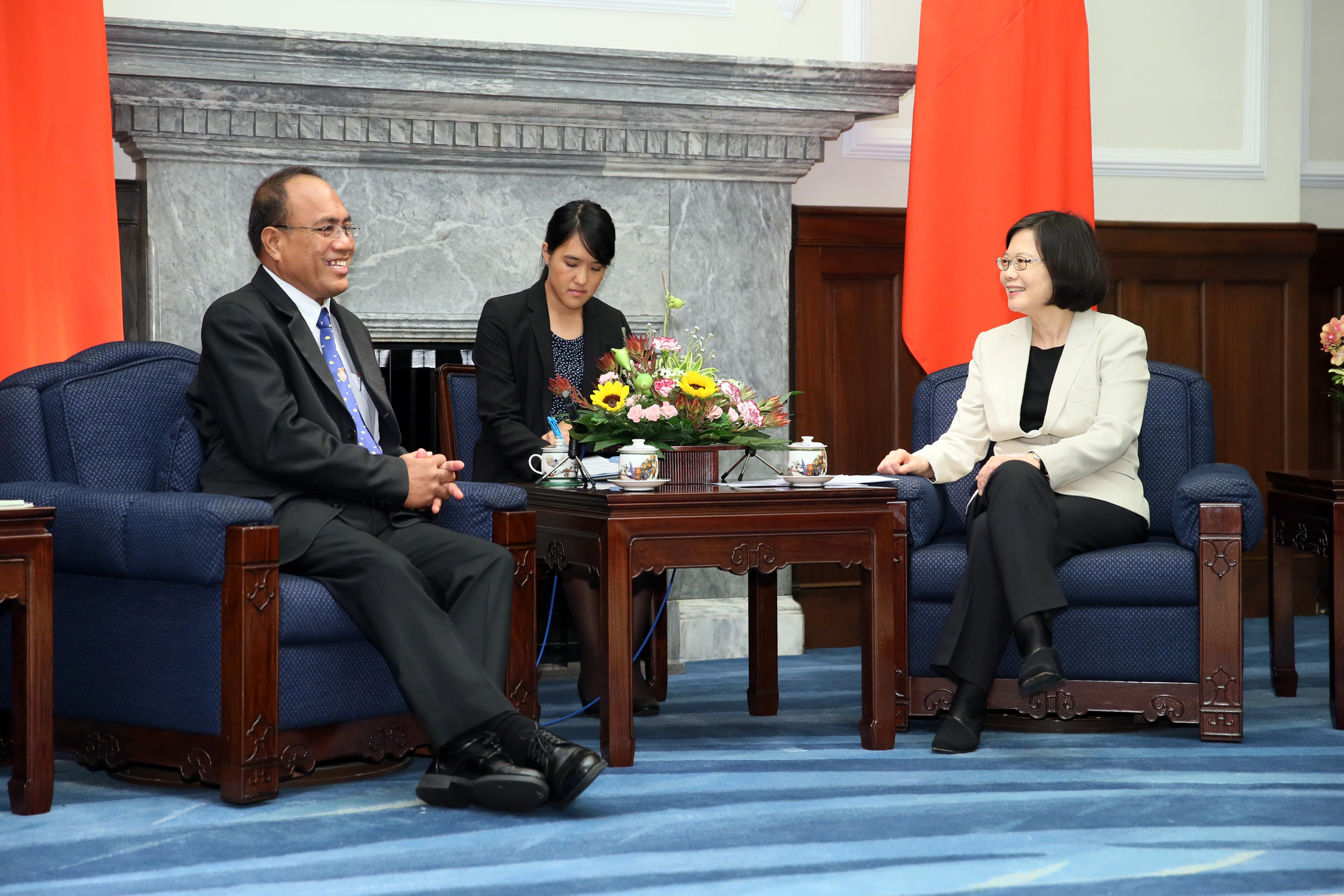
Kiribati President Taneti Mamau and President Tsai Ing-wen in Taiwan.

From 1980 to 2003, Kiribati recognised the PRC. Relations between China and Kiribati then became a contentious political issue within Kiribati. President Teburoro Tito was ousted in a parliamentary vote of no confidence in 2003, over his refusal to clarify the details of a land lease that had enabled Beijing to maintain a satellite-tracking station in the country since 1997, and over Chinese ambassador Ma Shuxue's acknowledged monetary donation to "a cooperative society linked to Tito". In the ensuing election, Anote Tong won the presidency after "stirring suspicions that the station was being used to spy on US installations in the Pacific". Tong had previously pledged to "review" the lease.

In November 2003, Tarawa established diplomatic relations with Taipei and Beijing severed its relations with the country. For the PRC, the presence of the satellite-tracking station had made relations with Kiribati relatively important; the station had, in particular, been used to track Yang Liwei's spaceflight. Therefore, for three weeks the PRC called upon I-Kiribati President Anote Tong to break off relations with Taiwan and re-affirm his support for the "One China" policy. Only after those three weeks did the PRC sever relations, thereby losing the right to maintain its satellite-tracking base. The ROC began providing economic aid to Kiribati, while Kiribati began supporting Taiwan in the United Nations.

In 2004, President Tong said he believed the PRC was trying to influence his country. The comment was mainly due to the PRC's refusal to remove all its personnel from its closed embassy. Tong stated that the Chinese personnel, who remained in Kiribati against his wishes, were handing out anti-government pamphlets; he told New Zealand journalist Michael Field: "I am sure if we did this in Beijing, we would be in jail in half a second". Tong's brother and main political opponent, Harry Tong, responded by accusing Taiwan of excessive influence on Kiribati, notably of influencing the country's clergy.

In 2008, Taiwan settled Kiribati's unpaid bills to Air Pacific, enabling the airline to maintain its services from Tarawa to Kiritimati.

In November 2010, despite their lack of diplomatic relations, the PRC was one of fifteen countries to attend the Tarawa Climate Change Conference in Kiribati, and one of twelve to sign the resulting Ambo Declaration on climate change. On 20 September 2019, Kiribati switched diplomatic relation from ROC to PRC.
