= Saint Kitts and Nevis–Taiwan relations =

- Republic of China: Saint Kitts and Nevis

Diplomatic mission
- Embassy of Taiwan, Basseterre: Embassy of St. Kitts and Nevis, Taipei

Envoy
- Ambassador Michael Lin: Ambassador Donya Lynex Francis

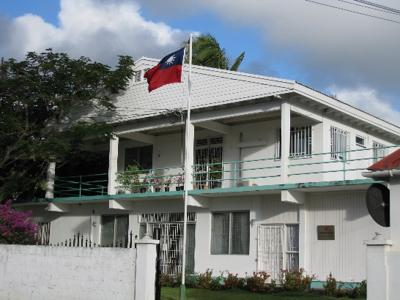
Embassy of Taiwan, Basseterre

Saint Kitts and Nevis–Taiwan relations refer to bilateral relations between St. Kitts and Nevis and the Republic of China (Taiwan).

== History ==
On October 9, 1983, the Prime Minister of St. Kitts and Nevis, Kennedy Simmonds, visited Taiwan and officially established relations with the Republic of China. Then on August 5, 1984, the Taiwanese government established an embassy at Basseterre. On January 28, 2008, St. Kitts and Nevis also established an embassy at Taipei.

== High level visits ==
=== St. Kitts and Nevis to Taiwan ===
Position	Official	Months of visit	Notes
Head of State (Governor-General)
Head of State (Governor-General)	Cuthbert Sebastian	November 1997, October 2002, May 2008	
Head of State (Governor-General)	Edmund Wickham Lawrence	May 2012	
Head of State (Governor-General)	Tapley Seaton	October 2018	
Head of State (Governor-General)	Marcella Liburd	October 2023	
Head of Government (Prime Minister)
Head of Government (Prime Minister)	Kennedy Simmonds	1983/10、1988/04	
Head of Government (Prime Minister)	Denzil Douglas	July 1996, July 1998, March 2001, November 2003, June 2005, November 2006, January 2008, March 2011, October 2013	
Head of Government (Prime Minister)	Timothy Harris	August 2015, May 2016, June 2017, April 2019	
Head of Government (Prime Minister)	Terrance Drew	November 2022, June 2024, November 2025	

=== Taiwan to St. Kitts and Nevis ===
Position	Name	Month of visit	Notes
Head of State (President)
Head of State (President)	Chen Shui-bian	September 2005	
Head of State (President)	Ma Ying-jeou	August 2013	
Head of State (President)	Tsai Ing-wen	July 2019	
Head of government (Premier)
Head of government (Premier)	Vincent Siew	May 1999	
Head of government (Premier)	Chang Chun-hsiung	September 2001	
Chief justice
Chief justice	Lai In-jaw	September 2008	

== List of Signed agreements ==
Date	Agreement	Notes
23 October, 1984	Agreement on Agricultural Technical Cooperation 《農業技術合作協定》	(Note: Extended on 8 April, 1987 and 13 July, 1989; re-signed on 11 December, 2013)
13 August, 1999	Agreement on ICDF Volunteers 《關於國際合作發展基金會志工協定》	
16 May, 2005	《聖克里斯多福及尼維斯聯邦外交及公務護照入境中華民國免簽證協定》	
26 July, 2006	Memorandum of Understanding on Cooperation for Information Exchange Concerning Avian Influenza 《禽流感疫情合作瞭解備忘錄》	
24 September, 2007	Agreement Concerning Cooperation in the Exchange of Intelligence to Combat Money Laundering and Financing Terrorism 《打擊洗錢及資助恐怖主義情報交換合作協定》	
28 January, 2008	Agreement on Technical Cooperation 《技術合作協定》	
10 September, 2009	Memorandum of Understanding on Human Resources Development 《育才計畫瞭解備忘錄》	(Note: Re-signed on 14 August, 2019)
19 July, 2013	Agreement on the Renewable Energy Policy Consultant-Dispatching Project 《再生能源政策諮商專家派遣計畫協定》	(Note: Extended on 5 September, 2014)
18 August, 2013	Treaty of Extradition 《引渡條約》	
8 November, 2013	Agreement on Cooperation in Information and Communication Technology (ICT) 《資訊通信技術合作協定(2013 - 2018)》	
1 September, 2014	Agreement on Cooperation in Immigration Affairs and Human Trafficking Prevention 《有關移民事務及防制人口販運合作協定》	
10 June, 2016	Agreement on Bilateral Cooperation 《兩國政府雙邊合作協定》	
2 December, 2016	Agreement on Police Cooperation 《警政合作協定》	
11 January, 2017	Agreement on Cooperation in Public Health and Medical Skills 《公共衛生及醫療技術合作協定》	
14 July, 2019	Agreement on Cooperation in Technical and Vocational Education and Training 《技職教育暨職業訓練合作協定》	
18 September, 2023	Agreement on Diplomatic Staff Training Cooperation 《外交部外交人員訓練及交流合作協定》	

== Trade relations ==
Trade volume between Taiwan and St. Kitts and Nevis (in USD)
Year	Trade volume	Annual change	Ranking	Taiwan → SKN	Annual change	Ranking	SKN → Taiwan	Annual change	Ranking
2022	1,563,308	▼44.25%	186	1,294,836	▼51.18%	175	268,472	▲76.82%	172
2023	581,969	▼62.77%	197	546,290	▼57.81%	182	35,679	▼86.71%	192
2024	782,120	▲34.39%	197	724,449	▲32.61%	181	57,671	▲61.63%	186

=== Trade products ===
- Taiwan → SKN: circuit board components, broadcasting equipment, TV, cellphones, ventilators, computers, VCR
- SKN → Taiwan: transformers, measuring and inspection equipment, electric machines, shoes and boots, scrap metals
