= Taipei Economic and Cultural Office, Mexico City =

- 墨西哥代表處; Taipei Economic and Cultural Office in Mexico; Oficina Económica y Cultural de Taipei en México

Agency overview
- Jurisdiction: Mexico; Costa Rica; Panama; Dominican Republic; El Salvador
- Headquarters: Mexico City, Mexico
- Agency executive: Violeta S. H. Hsu, Representative
- Website: Oficina Económica y Cultural de Taipei en México

The Taipei Economic and Cultural Office in Mexico; (Chinese: 墨西哥代表處; pinyin: Mòxīgē Dàibiǎo Chù) (Spanish: Oficina Económica y Cultural de Taipei en México) represents the interests of Taiwan in Mexico in the absence of formal diplomatic relations, functioning as a de facto embassy. Its counterpart in Taiwan is the Mexican Trade Services Documentation and Cultural Office in Taipei.

It is located in the Miguel Hidalgo borough.

The Office was established in 1993. Previously, Taiwan was represented by the Far East Trade Service Inc.. The Office is headed by a Representative, Carlos Liao.

== See also ==
- Mexico–Taiwan relations
- List of diplomatic missions of Taiwan
- List of diplomatic missions in Mexico
