= Taiwan Commercial Office in Tripoli =

- 臺灣駐利比亞商務代表處

Agency overview
- Formed: 13 February 2008
- Dissolved: 2011
- Jurisdiction: Libya
- Headquarters: Tripoli
- Parent agency: (Taiwan) Ministry of Foreign Affairs

The Taiwan Commercial Office in Tripoli (Chinese: 臺灣駐利比亞商務代表處) was a diplomatic mission of Taiwan in Libya that functioned as a de facto embassy in the absence of formal diplomatic relations.

A trade office was first established in Tripoli in 1980, after the government of Muammar Gaddafi established diplomatic relations with the People's Republic of China in 1978, but this was closed in 1997.

In 2006, following a meeting with Saif al-Islam Gaddafi, son of the then Libyan leader, President Chen Shui-bian announced plans to reopen the trade office. This was inaugurated on 13 February 2008.

During the 2011 civil war in Libya, the office was closed.

== See also ==
- List of diplomatic missions in Libya
