= Mexico–Taiwan relations =

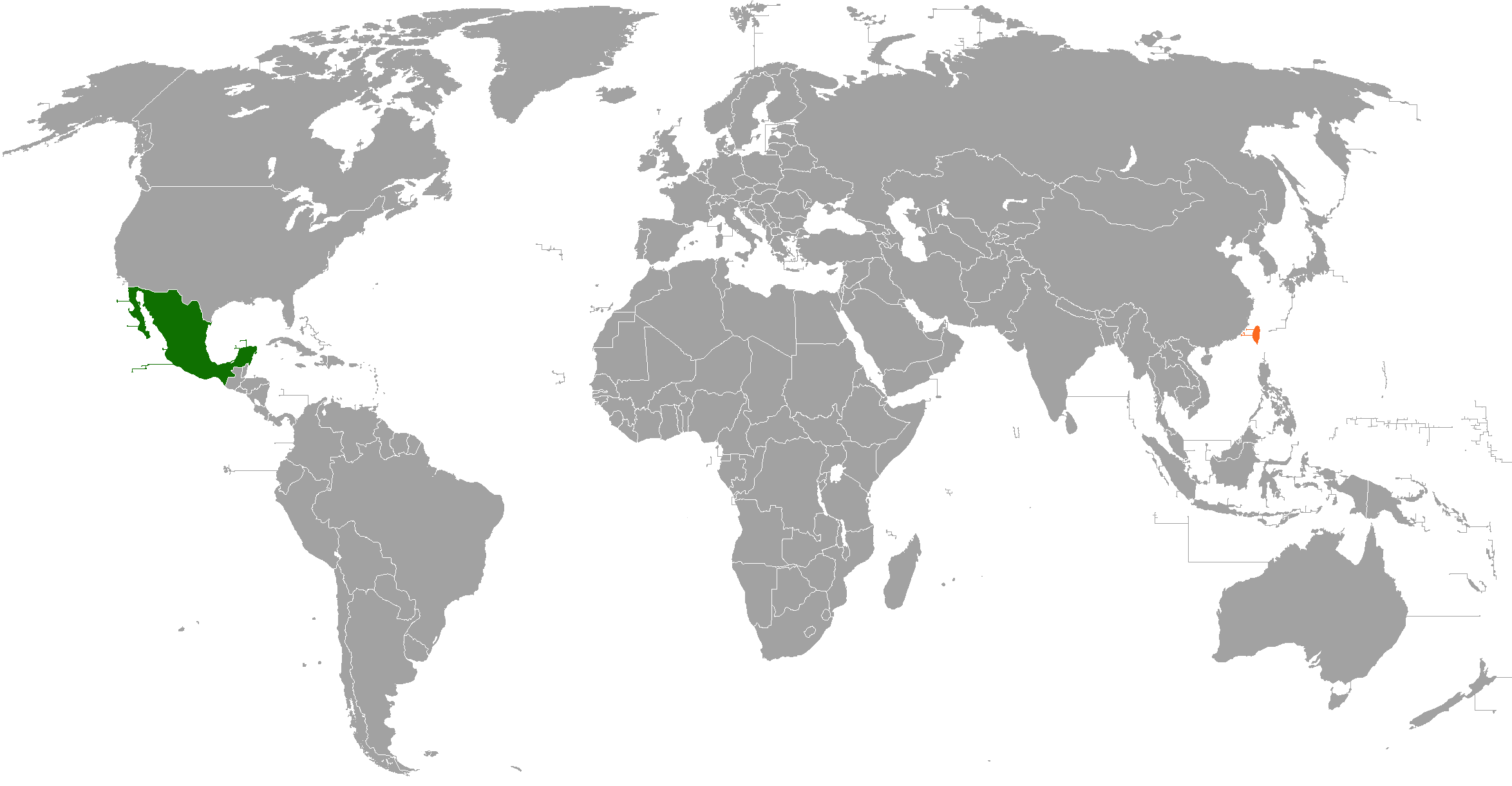

- Mexico: Taiwan

Diplomatic mission
- Mexican Trade Services Documentation and Cultural Office: Taipei Economic and Cultural Office in Mexico

Envoy
- Head of Office: Martin Torres Gutierrez Rubio: Representative Armando Cheng

Mexico and Taiwan (also known as Republic of China) have maintained unofficial bilateral relations since 1972. Previously, Mexico had formal relations with the Republic of China from 1949 until 1971, when it recognized the People's Republic of China. Both nations are members of the Asia-Pacific Economic Cooperation and the World Trade Organization.

== History ==
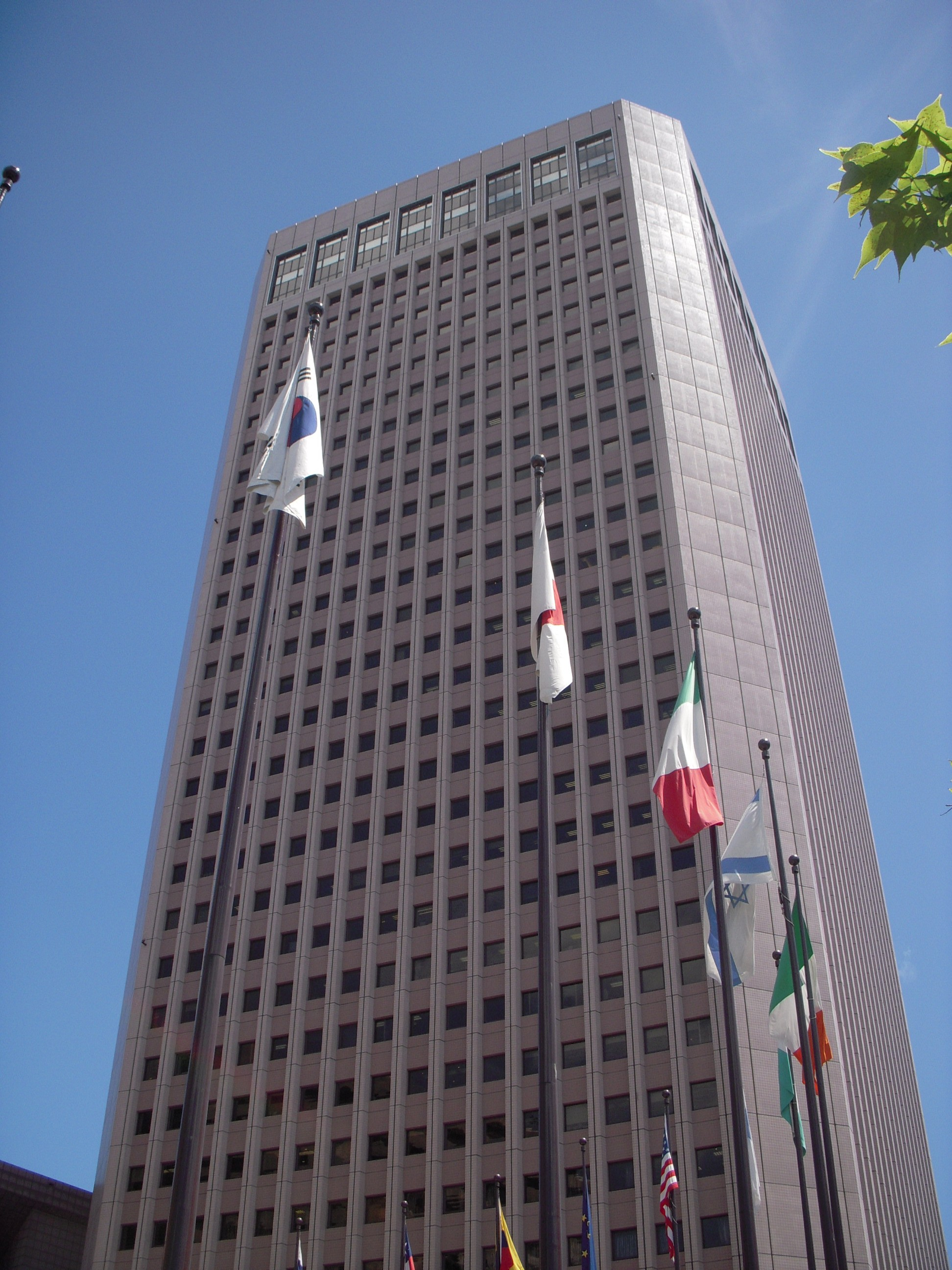
Building hosting the "Mexican Trade Services, Documentation and Cultural Office" in Taipei

In 1626, Spain established a colony in the northern part of present-day Taiwan. The colony of Spanish Formosa was held until 1642 and was administered by the Viceroy of New Spain in Mexico City. While under Spanish control, ships that sailed between the ports of Manila and Acapulco (known as the Manila galleon) would stop at the Spanish Fort of San Domingo to carry goods and people between Taiwan and the two ports.

Beginning in 1949, Mexico maintained diplomatic relations with the Kuomintang government of the Republic of China. However, official relations between Mexico and the Republic of China (Taiwan) ended in 1971 when Mexico voted in favor of the United Nations General Assembly Resolution 2758 which recognized the People's Republic of China (mainland China) "as the only legitimate representative of China to the United Nations". Since the adoption of UN Resolution 2758, Mexico has maintained official diplomatic relations with mainland China and unofficial diplomatic relations with Taiwan since 1972.

In order to promote trade, in 1990 Mexico opened a "Mexican Trade Services" office in Taipei (which held no diplomatic status). The office was later upgraded in 1991 to include a consular section and it was known as the "Mexican Trade Services, Documentation and Cultural Office". In 1993, Taiwan opened a 'Taipei Economic and Cultural Office' in Mexico City. Both representative offices are unofficially de facto embassies in each nations' capitals, respectively.

In 1991, the Taiwanese government proposed direct flights between Taiwan and Mexico with China Airlines to the government of Mexican President Carlos Salinas de Gortari, however, actions were never taken on the proposal. That same year, a high-level Mexican government official attended the 42nd National Day of the Republic of China. After several protests from the People's Republic of China on the Mexican official attending Taiwan's National Day, Mexican Deputy Foreign Minister Andrés Rozental Gutman promised to end all visits to Taiwan by Mexican government officials.

In 1994, Taiwanese Prime Minister Lien Chan paid a visit to Mexico and met with Mexican President Carlos Salinas de Gortari and presidential candidate Ernesto Zedillo. In November 2002, Taiwanese Representative of the President, Yuan T. Lee, visited Los Cabos, Mexico to attend the APEC summit.

In May 2012, a memorandum to explore a free trade agreement was signed between both nations.

== Trade ==
In 2023, total trade between both nations totaled US$14.9 billion. Mexico's exports to Taiwan include: machinery, telephones and mobile phones, motor cars and other vehicles, nickel, copper ores and other articles, chemical based products, vegetables, fish and other meat products. Taiwan's exports to Mexico include: electronic integrated circuits, parts and accessories for machines, electronics, parts and accessories of motor vehicles, clothing articles, and fish. More than 250 Taiwanese companies invest and/or operate in Mexico. Taiwanese multinational companies such as Foxconn, Invetec, Pegatron and Unimicron (among others) operate in Mexico.

Taiwan is the third largest investor in Mexico from Asia and Mexico's ninth biggest trading partner globally. Mexico is Taiwan's largest trading partner in Latin-America. In 2021, the Mexican Government issued its first 50 years Formosa bond in the Taipei Exchange.

== Resident diplomatic missions ==
- Mexico has a liaison office in Taipei known as the "Mexican Trade Services Documentation and Cultural Office".
- Taiwan has a liaison office in Mexico City known as the "Taipei Economic and Cultural Office in Mexico" (Oficina Económica y Cultural de Taipei en México).

== See also ==
- Taipei Economic and Cultural Office in Mexico
