= Cuba–Taiwan relations =

- Cuba: Taiwan

Diplomatic mission
- None: Accredited through the Taipei Commercial Office in Bogotá, Colombia

Cuba–Taiwan relations are the bilateral relations between Cuba and Taiwan, officially known as the Republic of China. The Republic of China and the Republic of Cuba had formal diplomatic relations from 1913 to 1960. After the Cuban Communist Revolution overthrew the pro-American old government, diplomatic relations were severed, and the new government became extremely unfriendly with the Republic of China. Cuba was the first country in the Americas to establish diplomatic relations with the People's Republic of China and sever ties with the Republic of China. Currently, there are no representative offices with embassy functions in each other's capitals; matters related to Cuba are concurrently managed by the Taipei Commercial Office in Colombia.

== History ==
In 1912, after the founding of the Republic of China, diplomatic representatives were sent to Cuba. On May 4, 1913, the Republic of China established minister-level diplomatic relations with Cuba, with most ministers serving concurrently. In 1919, the Legation of the Republic of Cuba to the Republic of China was established in Beijing, and a minister was stationed there. In 1921, the Republic of China Legation in the Republic of Cuba was established in Havana, and its concurrent position was changed to a full-time minister. On November 12, 1942, Cuban Minister of Foreign Affairs signed the Treaty of Friendship between the Republic of China and the Republic of Cuba.

In 1949, after the Republic of China government relocated to Taiwan on December 7 and the People's Republic of China took over mainland China, the two countries continued diplomatic relations, but Cuba did not send a minister. In March 1957, Cuba reestablished its legation in the capital, Taipei. (Note: From February 1957 to January 1959, the Embassy of Cuba in the Republic of China also administered the Republic of Korea, but this was suspended due to the severance of diplomatic relations with the Republic of Korea following the Cuban Revolution.) On August 23, 1957, diplomatic relations were upgraded to ambassadorial-level diplomatic relations, and the two countries' legations were upgraded to embassies, with ambassadors stationed there.

In January 1959, following the Cuban Revolution, the pro-American Batista government was overthrown. As Prime Minister of Cuba, Fidel Castro issued the Havana Declaration on September 2, 1960, recognizing the People's Republic of China. On September 3, the Republic of China severed diplomatic relations with Cuba.

On October 25, 1971, the 26th United Nations General Assembly voted on the proposal to "restore the legitimate rights of the People's Republic of China at the United Nations" proposed by Cuba and 23 other countries. (Note: People's Republic of Albania, Algeria, Myanmar, People's Republic of the Congo, Cuba, Equatorial Guinea, Guinea, Iraq, Mali, Mauritania, Kingdom of Nepal, Pakistan, Socialist Republic of Romania, Sierra Leone, Somalia, Ceylon, Democratic Republic of Sudan, Syria, Tanzania, People's Democratic Republic of Yemen, Arab Republic of Yemen, Socialist Federal Republic of Yugoslavia, and Zambia.) It was ultimately passed with 76 votes in favor, 35 against, and 17 abstentions. According to the United Nations Charter and the Rules of Procedure of the UN General Assembly, a proposal becomes a formal resolution upon passage, known as United Nations General Assembly Resolution 2758. The Republic of China, Maldives, and Oman did not vote. At that time, the Republic of China government, representing China's "legitimacy," led by Foreign Minister Chou Shu-kai, proactively announced its withdrawal from the United Nations at the General Assembly just hours before the vote. Later, the Republic of China government referred to this resolution as the 'Surrender Case.'

On April 14, 2016, Minister of Justice Luo Ying-shay of the Republic of China attended the Legislative Yuan's Judiciary and Legal Affairs Committee to give a special report on the deportation of Taiwanese fraud suspects from Kenya to mainland China. New Power Party legislator Huang Kuo-chang issued a red notice for a person in Panama who was wanted by the People's Republic of China, Taiwanese who were sent to Cuba and jumped to their deaths on the way to Cuba were questioned. Because Luo Yingxue mentioned 'then he died,' her wording infuriated Huang Kuo-chang. Luo Yingxue pointed out that after receiving the report, the Ministry of Justice consulted former Premier Mao Chi-kuo and President Ma Ying-jeou. Ma instructed the Ministry of Justice to negotiate with the Ministry of Foreign Affairs and the Mainland Affairs Council, but before negotiations could be reached, "the people boarded the plane." Huang Kuo-chang criticized the government's delay as the reason people were sent to Cuba; Luo Yingxue retorted, asking, 'Which side is delaying?' Both sides traded back and forth, neither showing weakness."

=== Cuba's opposition to Taiwan's participation in the World Health Assembly ===
In May 1997, May 2000, and May 2001, Cuba and several other countries spoke at the General Council of the World Health Assembly (WHA) opposing the proposal by Taiwan's diplomatic allies to include the Republic of China (Taiwan) in the agenda of the World Health Assembly as observers.

On January 14, 2002, Senegal, Grenada, Nicaragua, Guatemala, and Chad sent a letter to Gro Harlem Brundtland, director-general of the World Health Organization (WHO), between November 14 and 16, 2001, and requested that the proposal to "invite the Republic of China to participate in the World Health Assembly as an observer" be included in the discussion at the 55th World Health Assembly (WHA) in May 2002, and hoped that the WHO Executive Committee would include this proposal on the WHA's temporary agenda. The Cuban Executive Committee spoke demanding that the committee not discuss the above proposals, sparking heated debate. Finally, Cuba proposed a procedural motion, recommending that the proposal not to include Taiwan as an observer in the WHA agenda for discussion at the Executive Committee meeting and requesting it put to a vote. The motion was immediately voted on during the meeting, with 20 countries including North Korea in favor, 3 friendly countries opposed, 8 countries including the United Kingdom abstaining, and Kazakhstan absent and did not participate in the vote. Based on the voting results, the chairman announced that this proposal would not be included in the executive committee discussion.

On May 22, 2017, the World Health Assembly (WHA) opened. Before moving into the agenda, the conference discussed the agenda recommendations submitted by the General Affairs Committee, including supplementary proposals jointly submitted by 11 allied nations of the Republic of China, inviting Taiwan to attend the WHA as an observer. To allow all sides to fully express their views, the conference chair decided to hold a two-on-two debate, with diplomatic allies Saint Vincent and the Grenadines and Palau, as well as the People's Republic of China and Cuba, speaking on behalf of both sides and against sides. The Cuban representative pointed out that both UN General Assembly Resolution 2758 and WHA Resolution 25.1 have addressed the issue of the People's Republic of China as the sole Chinese representative attending WHA and related meetings, so the General Assembly should focus its efforts on important issues. In the end, the General Affairs Committee decided not to put it on the agenda.

In May 2018, May 2019, and May 2021 to May 2024, Cuba again banned Taiwan's diplomatic allies from the WHA General Affairs Committee in two-on-two debates, including proposals to "invite Taiwan to participate in the World Health Assembly as an observer" on the conference agenda.

== Visa ==
Nationals of both countries must apply for a visa to enter the other's country. Citizens holding a Taiwanese (Republic of China) passport can enter Cuba with an electronic visa, allowing a single-entry tourist visa to stay for 90 days, with an additional 90 days of extension.

Cuban nationals holding Cuban passports who arrive in Taiwan to participate in international conferences, sports events, trade shows, or other activities hosted or sponsored by central government agencies may enter the Republic of China with an electronic visa, staying for up to 30 days without extension.

In December 2023, Taiwanese tourists and Taiwanese Canadian tourists traveling to Cuba were refused entry by Cuban customs citing new policy regulations, as a result of refusing entry with Republic of China passports. The Ministry of Foreign Affairs of the Republic of China stated that currently, there is no relevant regulation or announcement on the Cuban government's website, and verification is ongoing. They also urged people to refrain from visiting until the information becomes clear.

== See also ==
- China–Cuba relations
- Foreign relations of Cuba
- Foreign relations of Taiwan
