= Liberia–Taiwan relations =

- Liberia: Taiwan

Liberia–Taiwan relations are foreign relations between Liberia and Taiwan. Liberia does not officially recognize Taiwan, instead recognizing the People's Republic of China as the one official government of China. Liberia maintained official diplomatic relations with Taiwan from 1957 to 1977 and again from 1989 to 2003. Relations between Liberia and China began in 2003. However, Liberia still maintains unofficial relations with Taiwan.

== History ==
On 24 April 1965, Liberian Vice President William Tolbert visited Taiwan.

Twelce years after the first severance of diplomatic relations in 1977, on 2 October 1989 the Liberian government announced it would restore ambassadorial relations with Taiwan. A joint communiqué reestablishing diplomatic ties was signed in Taipei on 9 October 1989. The diplomatic tie laster for fourteen years until 2003.

On 1977, Liberia severed ties with Taiwan for the first time.

On 28 March 2001, Liberian President Charles Taylor visited Taiwan.

On 12 October 2003, diplomatic relations were severed for a second time when Liberia reestablished relations with the PRC.
