= Taiwan–Venezuela relations =

- Taiwan: Venezuela

The Republic of China (Taiwan) and the Bolivarian Republic of Venezuela do not have official diplomatic relations, as Venezuela recognized the People's Republic of China in 1974, although unofficial relations were preserved through a Taipei Economic and Cultural Office in Caracas until it was closed in 2009.

In the 2000s, increasing partnership between the socialist government of Hugo Chávez and the People's Republic of China has led to a downplay of relations between Taiwan and Venezuela. During the Venezuelan presidential crisis, Taiwan has been supportive of Juan Guaidó and the opposition-led National Assembly in what it says are its efforts to restore democracy and stability in the country.

== History ==
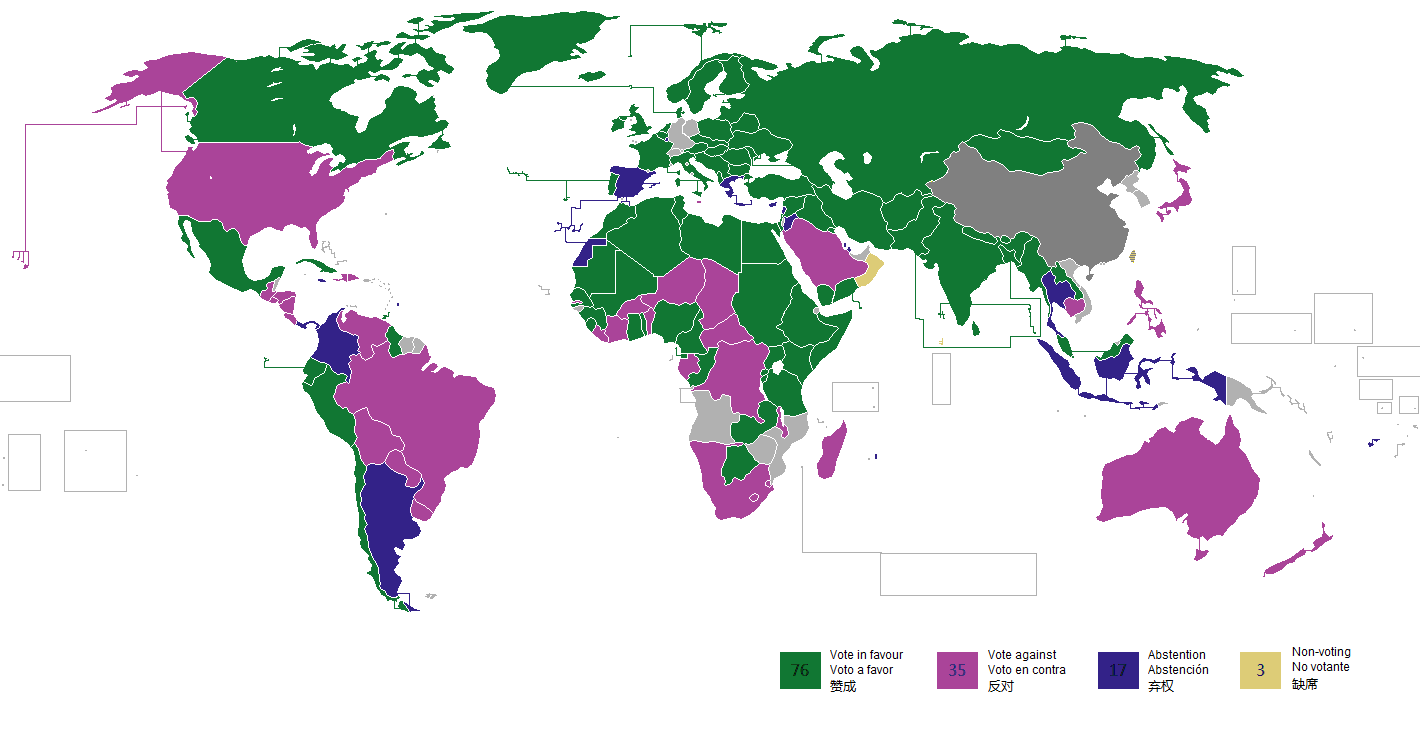
Venezuela voted against Resolution 2758, whose attempted to keep Nationalist China in the United Nations.

Relations between China and Venezuela began in August 1944 when an office was established in Caracas. In September 1949, José Manuel Ferrer who was in charge of the Venezuelan office in China moved with the government of the ROC to Taipei, whom regained the territory from Japan in 1945, when the Kuomintang leader, Chiang Kai-shek, lost the control of mainland China.

José Gil Borges was appointed to the position of ambassador of Venezuela in China in February 1966. On 1 July 1966 the previous ROC office in Caracas was promoted to the category of embassy.

In 1971, Venezuela voted against the United Nations General Assembly Resolution 2758 to retain China's representation in the United Nations. However, Venezuela broke diplomatic relations with the ROC in favor of the People's Republic of China on 28 June 1974 under the presidency of Carlos Andrés Pérez. An unofficial mission in Caracas, known as the Oficina Comercial de Taiwan was established to replace the former embassy. This was later renamed the Oficina Económica y Cultural de Taipei. Since the closure of the Office in 2009, the Oficina Comercial de Taipei in Bogotá, Colombia, has had responsibility for Venezuela.

== High level visits ==
In the past, some important Venezuelan politicians have visited Taiwan such as:

- Rafael Caldera - Former President of Venezuela (January 1992)
- Werner Corrales - Former Minister of Development (October 1995)
- Ramón Germán Monzón Salas - Former President of the foreign policy commission of the Venezuelan congress (January 1996)
- Juan José Caldera - Former Venezuelan Congress Senator (April 1997)
- Paciano Padrón: a former President of the foreign policy commission of the Venezuelan congress (January 1998)

== Relations under the Bolivarian Republic (1999–present) ==
=== Visa amendments ===
In March 2007, Venezuela repealed a 90-day visa exemption for Taiwan passport holders. Since then, visas for Taiwan citizens have been required.

In June 2007, the Venezuelan government decided not to renew visas for five members of Taiwan commercial representation in Caracas.

In July 2007, the spokesman for the Taiwan Ministry of Foreign Affairs, Wang Chien-yeh, said Taiwan held conversations with the Venezuelan government to reach an agreement in order to avoid the closure of the Taiwanese commercial representation.

In the case of a shutting down of Taiwanese office those Venezuelans who want to travel to Taiwan have to ask for visas in other countries such as Colombia or Panama and Taiwanese citizens who want to visit Venezuela have to ask a visa in other countries, such as the Venezuelan consulate in Hong Kong.

=== CPC Corporation, Taiwan ===
The government of Hugo Chávez nationalized all foreign-owned oil fields and took over oil fields belonging to companies which refused to sign agreements of a joint venture with PDVSA.

In July 2007, the Taiwan state-run oil firm CPC Corporation said the government of Venezuela had asked the firm to give up the 7.5 percent shares CPC holds on two oil fields the firm has in the South American country. The president of the CPC, Chen Pao-lang, said CPC will hold contacts with the Venezuelan government in order to defend their oil exploration rights on the two oil fields. Besides Chen said if no progress is made, CPC does not rule out a possible international arbitration.

=== 2019 presidential crisis ===
In January 2019, the ROC was among the several countries to support Juan Guaidó and the opposition-led National Assembly in its calls to restore democracy. Through its Twitter account, the Foreign Ministry quoted that Taiwan stands with the forces of freedom while calling for the democratic order to be restored in Venezuela.

==== Humanitarian aid ====
In February 2019, during the 2019 shipping of humanitarian aid to Venezuela, the government of Taiwan destined US$500,000 for the humanitarian aid to Venezuela, which was announced by Taiwan's representative to the US Stanley Kao during the World Congress of Humanitarian Crisis of Venezuela in Washington. National Assembly deputy of Miranda State Jesús Yánez thanked Taiwan for its donation to the crisis-hit country. In response, Foreign Minister Joseph Wu declared that "Venezuela needs democracy and an immediate economic stability, as the people of Venezuela deserve a better future."

During the coronavirus pandemic in March 2020, deputy Jesús Yánez announced that the government of Taiwan donated 1,000 surgical masks as a measure to prevent the pandemic. The masks were distributed in five stations of the Caracas Metro (Plaza Sucre, Pérez Bonalde, Plaza Venezuela, Chacao and Petare). Yánez highlighted that the metro is a means of transportation used by a large part of the population and is a breeding ground for the pandemic due to the crowding of people in closed spaces if any positive case should become known.

==== 2020 reelection of Guaidó ====
Taiwan's Minister of Foreign Affairs (MOFA) congratulated Guaidó on his reelection as National Assembly president and reiterated its support for free elections in Venezuela. The ministry says that Taiwan is ready to work with like-minded partners in further assisting the people restore the country's democracy & prosperity.

== Trade ==
In 2005 Venezuela was the eighth most important largest trading partner in Latin America for Taiwan. Taiwan exports to Venezuela parts and accessories of the motor vehicles of headings, baler machinery, electrical machinery and equipment and parts, sound recorders, television imagers, reproducers, vehicles other than railway or tramway rolling stock, plastics and plastics articles, rubber and rubber articles, man-made filaments, iron and steel, cotton, furniture, optical instruments and toys.

In return, Venezuela exports to Taiwan organic chemicals, raw hides and skins, aluminum and aluminum articles, iron and steel, plastics and plastic articles, copper and copper articles, inorganic chemicals, optical instrument, rubber and articles.

== Migration ==
In 2007, around 400 people from Taiwan lived in Venezuela. Many of them were owners of companies that manufacture plastics, ceramics, textiles, glass, and marketing finished products.

At the end of July 2007 more than 100 pilots, a baseball player and a student from Venezuela were living in Taiwan. The pilots have been working in Taiwan after the bankruptcy of some Venezuelan airlines such as Viasa and Avensa.

== See also ==
- China–Venezuela relations
