= Taipei Economic and Cultural Office, Lima =

De facto embassy of the Republic of China

Taipei Economic and Cultural Office in Peru
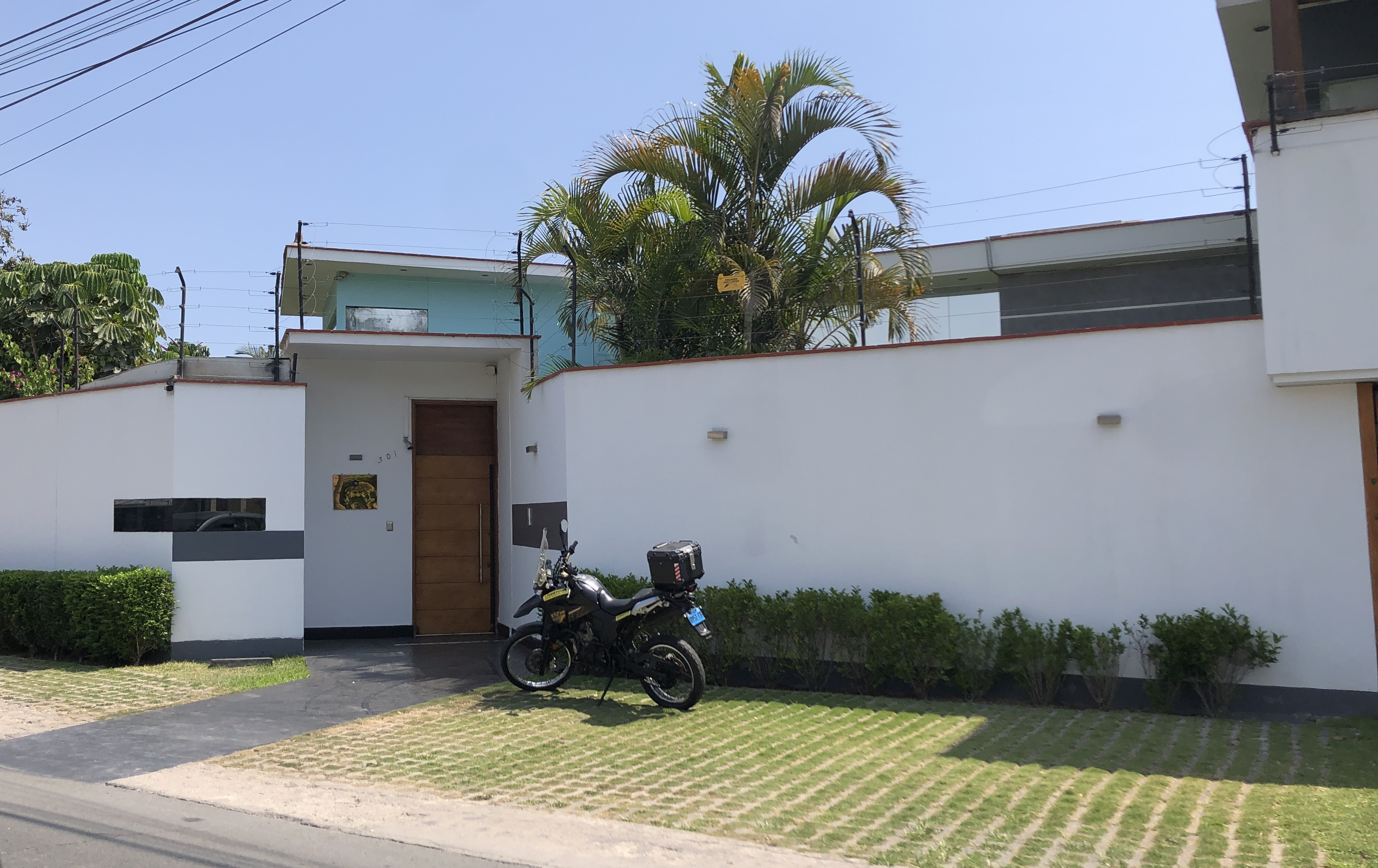
- Location: La Molina, Lima, Peru
- Address: Av. Las Palmeras 301
- Opening: March 1978
- Ambassador: Francisca Yu-Tsz Chang
- Jurisdiction: Peru; Bolivia
- Website: www.roc-taiwan.org/pe/

The Taipei Economic and Cultural Office in Peru (Note: Chinese: 駐秘魯臺北經濟文化辦事處; pinyin: Zhù bìlǔ táiběi jīngjì wénhuà bànshì chù; Spanish: Oficina Económica y Cultural de Taipei en el Perú) represents the interests of Taiwan in Peru, acting as a de facto embassy in the absence of diplomatic relations. The office is also accredited in Bolivia.

The office is responsible for promoting bilateral relations between Taiwan and Peru at various levels, as well as handling consular-related businesses and providing services for overseas Chinese and emergency assistance for foreigners.

The representative office of the Peruvian government in Taiwan is the Commercial Office of Peru in Taipei. (Note: Spanish: Oficina Comercial del Perú en Taipei, also known as OCEX Taipéi)

== History ==
=== Embassy ===
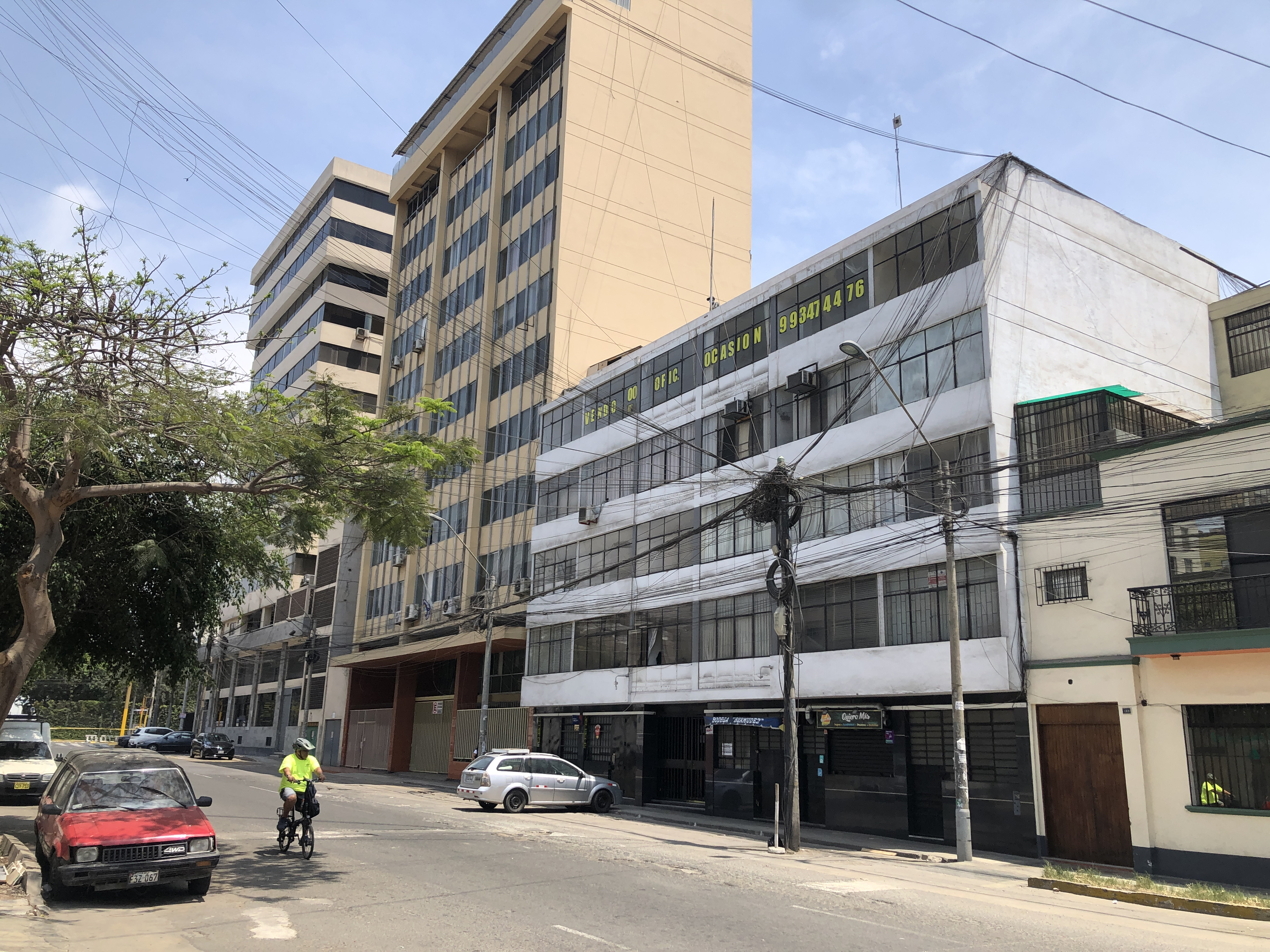
The embassy's final location was the fifth floor of the building on the right, from 1966 until 1971.

Peru established relations with the Qing dynasty with the signing of a treaty in Tianjin on June 26, 1874. Peru's first Resident Ambassador was named the next year, assuming his duties on May 20, 1878, while the Chinese ambassador would only reach Peru in 1883, after the War of the Pacific. In 1946, the Chinese mission's address was Jr. Ocoña 215 located at the Historic Centre of Lima.

Then Republic of China ambassador Liu Tsung-han made his last public appearance on November 1, 1971. The Central Chinese Welfare Society (Spanish: Sociedad Central de Beneficencia China) had organized a celebration honouring the 85th birthday of Chiang Kai-shek, with one hundred Chinese immigrants attending the party. By this point, the imminent recognition of the Beijing government by the military government of Juan Velasco Alvarado was well known, which caused a somber mood for those present.

The official announcement of Peru's recognition of the People's Republic of China instead of the Republic of China was issued via a memo made public on November 2, 1971. In response, the ROC ambassador left for Jorge Chávez International Airport on November 4, making a speech before departing to a crowd of several pro-ROC Chinese denouncing the memo and announcing the cessation of diplomatic relations between both countries on the same day.

Following Tsung-han's departure, other members of the diplomatic staff also left for Taiwan. On December 14, the emblem of the Republic of China was removed from the embassy, then located on the 5th floor of Jr. Pablo Bermúdez 177, in Santa Beatriz, and a group composed of Consul General Ding Zhan'ao and secretaries Cai Shuiliang and Wu Jixiong left for Taiwan on January 1, 1972. On the same day, Chinese associations in Lima celebrated the founding of the Republic of China, then still popular among the Chinese colony in Lima.

The new embassy of the Beijing government would later open in February 1972.

=== Taipei Economic and Cultural Office ===
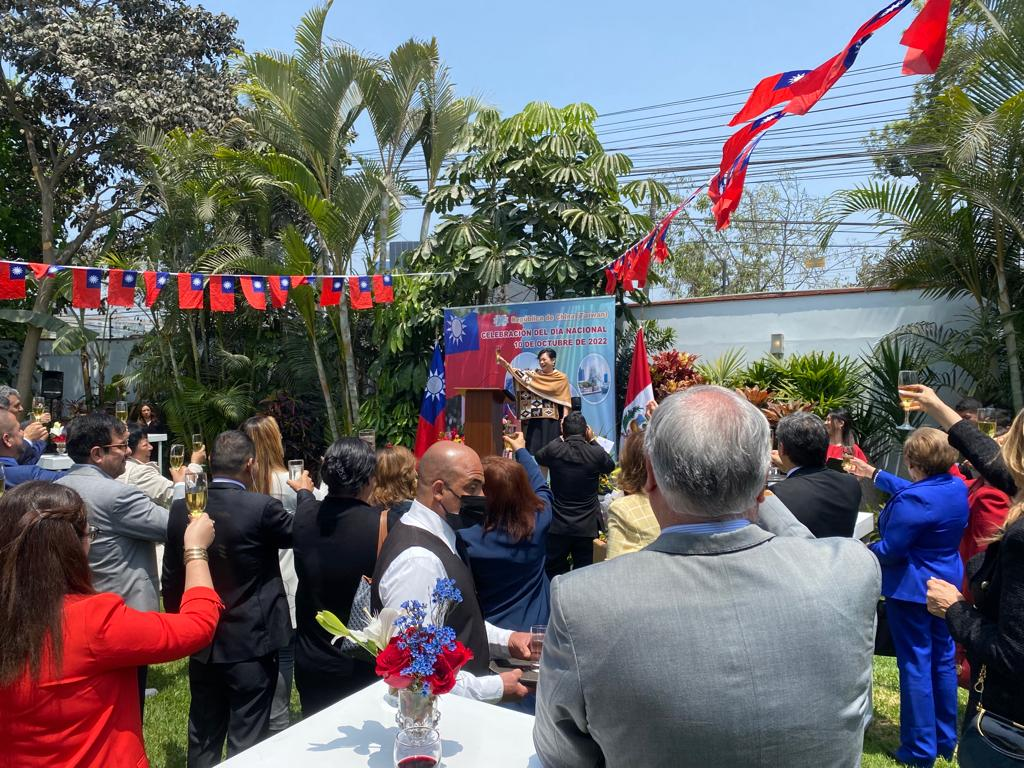
The office during National Day celebrations

In 1978, the Republic of China established the Far East Trade Center in Peru (Chinese: 駐秘魯遠東貿易中心; pinyin: Zhù bìlǔ yuǎndōng màoyì zhōngxīn; Spanish: Centro Comercial del Lejano Oriente) in Lima. A former location was located at Av. Benavides 1780.

President Alberto Fujimori approved Supreme Executive Order No. RE014, agreeing to change the name of "Far East Trade Center" to "Taipei Economic and Cultural Office in Peru". On March 3, 1994, Peru established a commercial office in Taiwan.

== List of representatives ==
Representative of the Taipei Economic and Cultural Office to Peru
- 駐秘魯臺北經濟文化辦事處代表
- National Emblem of the Republic of China

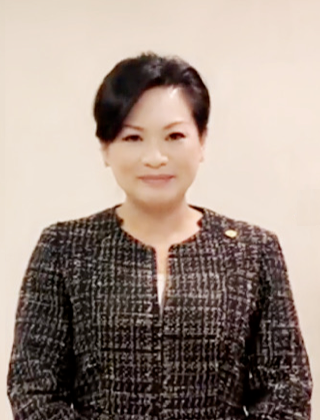
- Incumbent; Francisca Yu-Tsz Chang since December 2021
- Ministry of Foreign Affairs
- Inaugural holder: Wang Yun-chang
- Formation: 1978

The Representative of the Taipei Economic and Cultural Office in Peru (Note: Chinese: 駐秘魯臺北經濟文化辦事處代表; pinyin: Zhù bìlǔ táiběi jīngjì wénhuà bànshì chù dàibiǎo; Spanish: Representante de la Oficina Económica y Cultural de Taipei en Perú) functions as a de facto representative of the Republic of China to Peru, with the office being described at times as an embassy and the representative being described at times as an ambassador, both by government and local media sources.

| Name | | Term begin | Term end | Notes |
|---|---|---|---|---|
Embassy in Lima closed in 1971; Commercial Office opened in 1978
| Wang Yun-chang | 王允昌 | 1978 | 1983 | First representative of the ROC in Peru. He was the son of writer Wang Pingling. |
| Ding Ke | 丁珂 | 1983 | 1989 | Second representative to Peru. On several occasions, he was the victim of car bombs left by terrorist group Shining Path. |
| Jeffrey Chia-Feng Liu | 劉佳豐 | 1989 | 1996 | Married to Jenny Shiu-hui. He started his tenure when the office was under the name of Far East Trade Center. |
| Ming-Ta Hung | 洪明達 | 1997 | 2001 | |
| Enrique Liu | 劉春匪 | 2002 | 2002 | |
| Pedro Y.C. Hsiang | 向延竚 | 2003 | 2006 | |
| Frank H. S. Lin | 林信行 | April 3, 2006 | July 16, 2007 | Resigned. |
| Huang Lien-sheng | 黃聯昇 | August 13, 2007 | September 14, 2009 | Resigned on September 14, 2009. |
| Alejandro R. K. Huang | 黃榮國 | September 14, 2010 | 2013 | Huang became the representative on September 14, having been deputy representative since the 9th. |
| Jaime Chin-Mu Wu | 吳進木 | 2013 | 2017 | |
| Miguel Li-Jey Tsao | 曹立傑 | August 2017 | November 2018 | |
| Iván Yueh-Jung Lee | 李岳融 | November 2018 | November 2021 | Designated ambassador to Nicaragua in 2021. |
| Francisca Yu-Tsz Chang | 張幼慈 | December 2021 | Incumbent | |

== See also ==
- Peru–Taiwan relations
- List of diplomatic missions of Taiwan
- Embassy of China, Lima

== Bibliography ==
- Basadre Grohmann, Jorge (2014). Historia de la República del Perú [1822-1933]. Vol. 5. El Comercio. ISBN 978-612-306-353-5.
- Zhang, Xiaoxu (2022-09-19). "La identidad política de los inmigrantes chinos en el Perú con su país de origen: a principios de la década 1970s". Ibero-América Studies. 4 (2): 30–38. doi:10.55704/ias.v4i2.04. S2CID 252402046.
- Clemente Pecho, Jazmina Lizbeth (2020). La importancia de la rectoría del Ministerio de Relaciones Exteriores del Perú en la celebración de instrumentos internacionales: análisis de la celebración de instrumentos con entidades no estatales en el marco de las relaciones del Perú con China y Taiwán (PDF) (in Spanish). Lima: Academia Diplomática del Perú Javier Pérez de Cuéllar. p. 84.
- García Corrochano, Luis (2019). Las relaciones entre Perú y China en perspectiva histórica (in Spanish). Lima: PUCP. ISBN 9781909890459.
