= List of ambassadors of the Republic of China to Guatemala =

Coordinates: 14.599941°N 90.522895°W

Taiwanese Ambassador to Guatemala
- Incumbent; John Chieng-Chung Lai since 1 October 2015
- Inaugural holder: Li Chin
- Formation: 1 August 1956; 70 years ago

The Taiwanese Ambassador to Guatemala is the official representative of the Republic of China to the Republic of Guatemala.

== History ==
- In 1935 diplomatic relations between the governments of Guatemala and the Republic of China were established, when the Consulate General of the Republic of China was installed in Guatemala City.
- In 1954 the rank of the representation rose from Consulate General to Legation.
- In 1960 the rank of the representation rose from Legation to Embassy.

== List of representatives ==
Start date	Ambassador	Chinese language zh:中華民國駐瓜地馬拉大使列表	Notes	Premier of the Republic of China	President of Guatemala	End date
August 1, 1956	Li Chin	zh:李琴		Yu Hung-Chun	Carlos Castillo Armas	July 1, 1959
July 1, 1959	Wang Feng	汪丰		Chen Cheng	Miguel Ydígoras Fuentes	October 1, 1960
October 1, 1960	Wang Feng	汪丰		Chen Cheng	Miguel Ydígoras Fuentes	January 1, 1972
January 1, 1972	Mao Chi-hsien	毛起鷴		Chiang Ching-kuo	Carlos Arana Osorio	October 1, 1979
October 1, 1979	Hsueh Jen-yang	zh:薛人仰		Sun Yun-suan	Fernando Romeo Lucas García	May 1, 1981
May 1, 1981	Loh I-Cheng	陆以正	Until 1996, he was the ambassador in Pretoria.	Sun Yun-suan	Fernando Romeo Lucas García	December 1, 1985
1990	Francisco Ou	zh:歐鴻鍊		Hau Pei-tsun	Marco Vinicio Cerezo Arévalo	1996
1997	Andrew J. S. Wu	吴仁修		Vincent Siew	Álvaro Arzú Irigoyen	January 1, 2002
January 1, 2002	Francisco Lung Yuan Hwang	黃瀧元		Yu Shyi-kun	Alfonso Antonio Portillo Cabrera	October 1, 2002
October 1, 2002	Francisco Ou	zh:歐鴻鍊		Yu Shyi-kun	Alfonso Antonio Portillo Cabrera	May 1, 2008
June 1, 2008	Adolfo Ta-chen Sun	孙大成		Liu Chao-shiuan	Álvaro Colom	October 1, 2015
October 1, 2015	John Chieng-Chung Lai	賴建中	Until 2001, he was the ambassador to Honduras.	Mao Chi-kuo	Álvaro Colom	
