= Francisco Lung Yuan Hwang =

- 黃瀧元

Chinese Ambassador to Guatemala of Taiwan to Guatemala
- In office January 2002 – October 2002
- Preceded by: Andrew J. S. Wu
- Succeeded by: Francisco Ou

Personal details
- Born: January 25, 1941 (age 85) Taiwan
- Spouse(s): Chen, Fu-mei
- Children: one daughter, one son.
- Education: Tamkang University (BA)

Francisco Lung Yuan Hwang (born January 25, 1941) is a retired Taiwanese ambassador.

== Education ==
Hwang graduated from Tamkang University in 1966 with a Bachelor of Arts (B.A.) specializing in the Spanish language.

== Career ==
Hwang's career began at the Ministry of Foreign Affairs in Taipei in 1968. A fluent Spanish speaker, he moved to the Taiwanese embassy in San José, Costa Rica, in 1971, moving up the ranks to become First Secretary before his departure in 1983. From 1984 to 1985 he was special secretary to the Chief Protocol in the Ministry of Foreign Affairs, before being appointed Deputy Director of the Central and South America department in 1985, then Deputy Director of Protocol in 1986, returning to Costa Rica as Cultural Counsel later that year, a post he held until 1992.

Between 1992 and 1996 he worked as a Representative at the Commercial and Cultural Office of Taiwan in Buenos Aires, Argentina, before returning to the Ministry in Taiwan to serve as Director General, first of the Department of Protocol (1996–97), then the Department of Central and South America (1997–98) and finally the Department of Public Relations (1998-2000). After this he returned to South America to serve as Representative at the Taipei Economic and Cultural Representative Office in Santiago de Chile from 2000 to 2001. In 2002 he was appointed ambassador to Guatemala, and in 2003 Vice Minister of Foreign Affairs.
