= Francisco Ou =

Taiwanese diplomat and politician (1940–2021)

- 歐鴻鍊
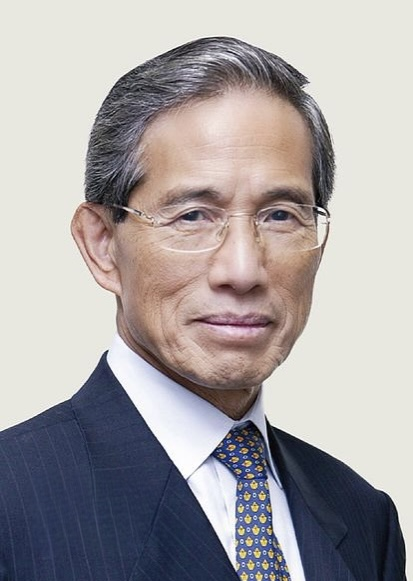
- Official portrait, 2008

19th Minister of Foreign Affairs
- In office 20 May 2008 – 10 September 2009
- Premier: Liu Chao-shiuan
- Deputy: Andrew Hsia
- Preceded by: Yang Tzu-pao (acting)
- Succeeded by: Timothy Yang
Additional diplomatic offices
Ambassador of Taiwan to Guatemala
In office 1 October 2002 – 1 May 2008
Preceded by	Francisco Lung
Succeeded by	Adolfo Sun
In office 1990–1996
Preceded by	Loh I-cheng
Succeeded by	Andrew Wu
Ambassador of Taiwan to Nicaragua
In office 24 August 1984 – 23 December 1985
Preceded by	Mao Chi-hsien
Succeeded by	Yu Chengren

Personal details
- Born: 5 January 1940 Hsinchu, Taiwan, Empire of Japan
- Died: 30 October 2021 (aged 81)
- Education: National Chengchi University (BA)

Francisco H.L. Ou (traditional Chinese: 歐鴻鍊; simplified Chinese: 欧鸿链; pinyin: Oū Hóngliàn; 5 January 1940 – 30 October 2021) was a Taiwanese diplomat who served as the Minister of Foreign Affairs from 2008 to 2009. Before serving as foreign minister, he was ambassador to Nicaragua and Guatemala.

== Early life and education ==
Ou was born in Hsinchu, Taiwan, and raised in Hualien. His father was arrested during the February 28 Incident in 1947. He and his family lived in poverty during his younger days. Ou received his Bachelor of Arts from National Chengchi University in 1962.

== Political career ==
Upon graduation, he then went on to serve in the government in several diplomatic capacities, mostly with Central and South American nations. He was also the Spanish interpreter for late President Chiang Kai-shek and Chiang Ching-Kuo. Ou served as Embassy secretary to Peru (1967–71), ambassador to Nicaragua (1984–85) and Guatemala (1990–96, 2003-8). He has also been director of the Far East Commercial Office in Santiago, Chile (1975-1981), director of the Taiwan Commercial Office in Argentina (1986–90) and representative for the Taiwan Economic and Cultural Office in Spain (2000–03).

== ROC Foreign Ministry ==
=== Foreign ministry appointment ===
Ou had planned to retire after turning 65 and applied for permanent residency (‘green card’) in the United States of America. Although he had not expected to be tapped as Foreign Minister when Ma Ying-jeou formed his new government in 2008, Ou accepted Ma's offer. He immediately gave up his green card upon accepting his new post. His possession of a green card generated minor controversy in Taiwanese circles as many viewed the possession of extra-Taiwan status (citizenship or even a green card) as being unpatriotic. Ou, however, claimed that he was merely planning for his retirement, for most of his family members live in the US, and applied for a green card out of realistic thinking.

=== Foreign ministry resignation ===
Ou resigned from his post effective 10 September 2009, along with outgoing Premier Liu Chao-Shiuan and the rest of the Cabinet in a reshuffling of government, mostly due to the slow government response handling the Typhoon Morakot aftermath. He was replaced by Timothy Yang, formerly the Republic of China's representative to Indonesia.

== Personal life ==
Ou was fluent in Taiwanese, Mandarin Chinese, English, French, and Spanish. He was also an avid table tennis player.

Ou reportedly underwent surgery in August 2021, and was hospitalized before his death on 30 October 2021, aged 81.
