= Peru–Taiwan relations =

- Peru: Taiwan

Diplomatic mission
- Commercial Office of Peru to Taipei: Taipei Economic and Cultural Office in Peru

Peru–Taiwan relations are the bilateral relations between the Republic of China (Taiwan) and the Republic of Peru. Relations were officially severed in 1971, but are unofficially maintained through the presence of representative offices in each country's capital city.

== History ==
Peru established relations with the Qing dynasty with the signing of a treaty in Tianjin on June 26, 1874. Peru's first Resident Ambassador was named the next year, assuming his duties on May 20, 1878, while the Chinese ambassador would only reach Peru in 1883, after the War of the Pacific. Relations between both states started with the Coolie Trade and matured during the ‘Hundred Years weakness and poverty’ (Wang, 1993) from the 1840s to 1949 of the impoverished Qing China, followed by a republic divided by civil wars and invaded by Japan.

After the establishment of the Republic of China, Peru maintained its relations with the new Kuomintang government. In 1944, the diplomatic status of the two countries was raised to embassy level, and high-level officials of the two countries exchanged frequent visits in the 1950s and 1960s. As a result of the Chinese Civil War, Peru closed its embassy in Beijing in 1946.

The anticipated official announcement of Peru's recognition of the People's Republic of China instead of the Republic of China was issued via a memo made public on November 2, 1971. In response, the final Kuomintang ambassador, Liu Tsung-han, left for Jorge Chávez International Airport on November 4, making a speech before departing to a crowd of several pro-Kuomintang Chinese denouncing the memo and announcing the cessation of diplomatic relations between both countries on the same day.

Following Tsung-han's departure, other members of the diplomatic staff also left for Taiwan. On December 14, the Kuomintang's emblem was removed from the embassy, then located on the 5th floor of Jr. Pablo Bermúdez 177, and a group composed of Consul General Ding Zhan'ao and secretaries Cai Shuiliang and Wu Jixiong left for Taiwan on January 1, 1972. On the same day, Chinese associations in Lima celebrated the founding of the Republic of China, then still popular among the Chinese colony in Lima.

The new embassy of the Beijing government would later open in February 1972.

== High-level visits ==
High-level visits from Taiwan to Peru

- Special Representative Lien Chan (2008)
- Special Representative James Soong (2016)

High-level visits from Peru to Taiwan

- President Manuel Prado Ugarteche (1961)
- Prime Minister Ernesto Montagne Sánchez (1970)
- Former president Alejandro Toledo (2008)
- Congressman Luis Galarreta (2019)

== Trade ==
As of 2022, Peru is Taiwan's fifth commercial partner in Latin America.

== Resident diplomatic missions ==
- Taiwan has a representative office in Lima.
- Peru has a representative office in Taipei.
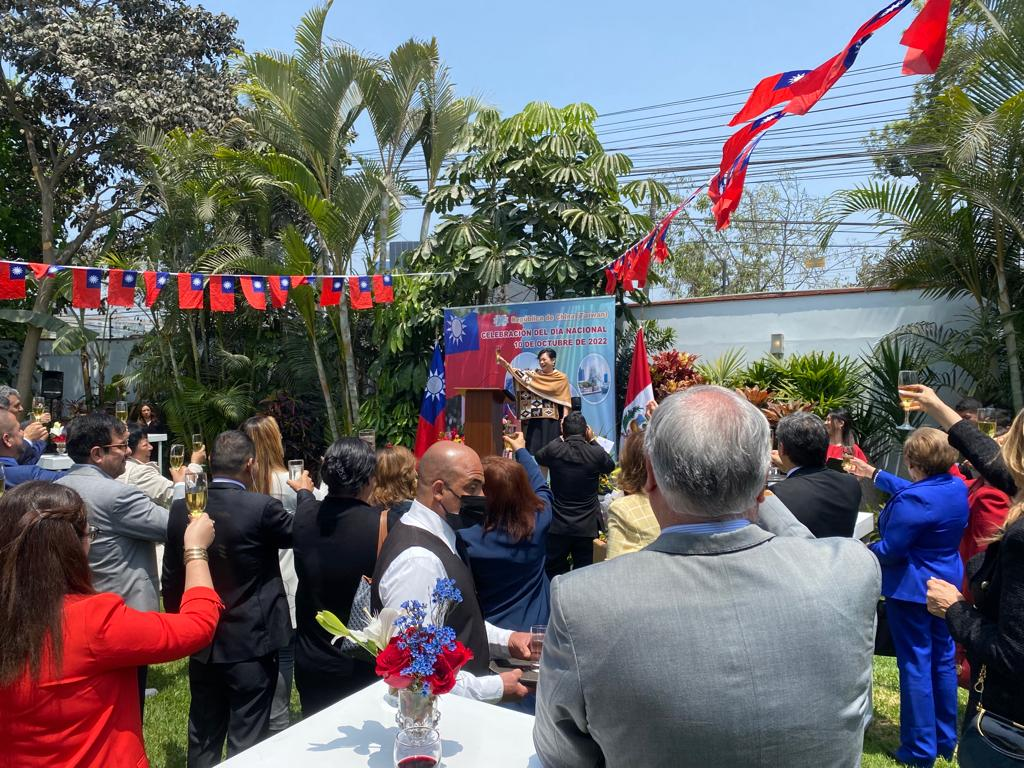
ROC office in Lima during National Day celebrations

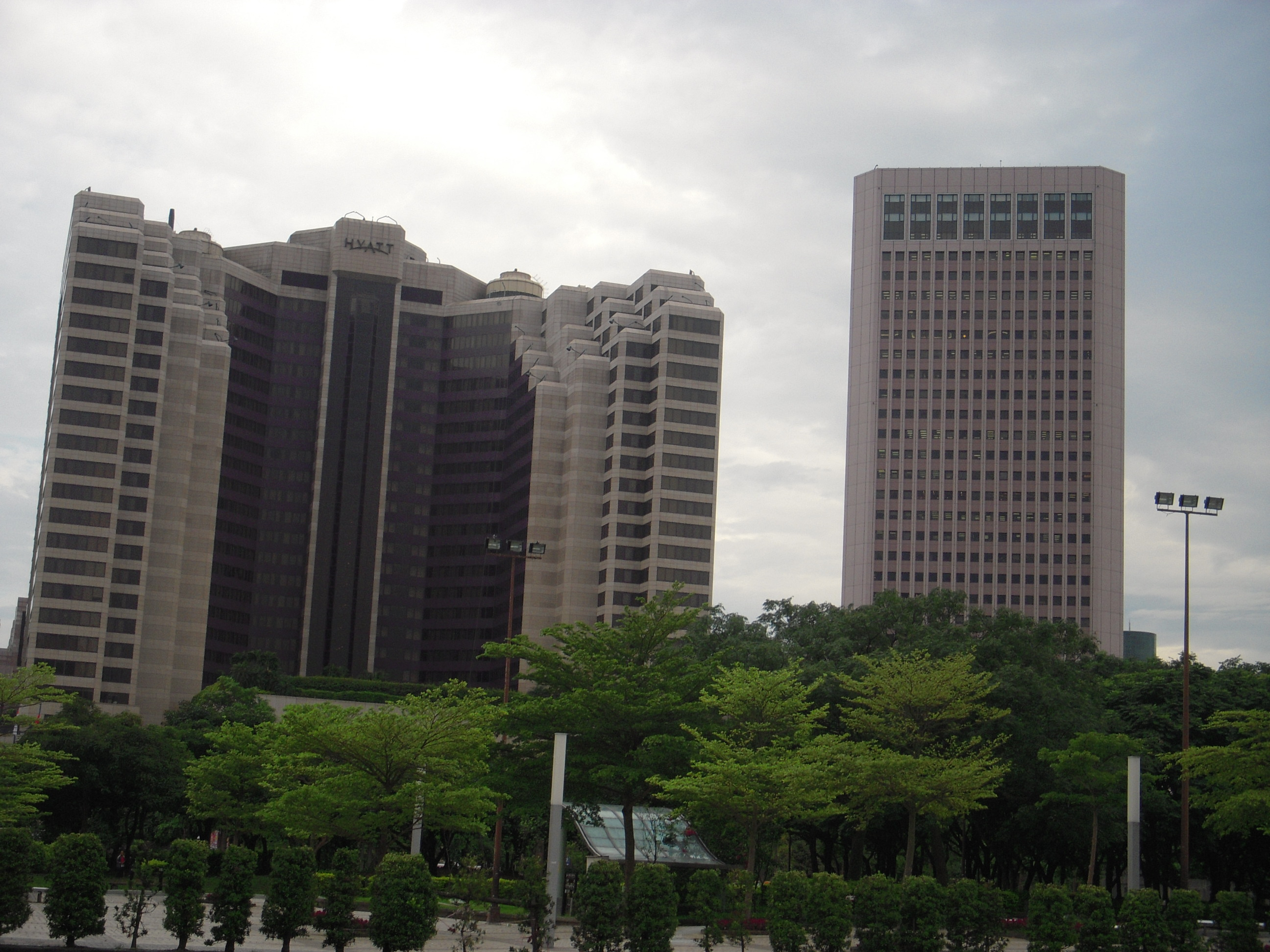
Peruvian office in Taipei, located in the building to the right

== See also ==
- Foreign relations of Peru
- Foreign relations of Taiwan
- List of ambassadors of the Republic of China to Peru
- List of ambassadors of Peru to the Republic of China
