= Timothy Yang =

Taiwanese politician (1942–2026)

- 楊進添
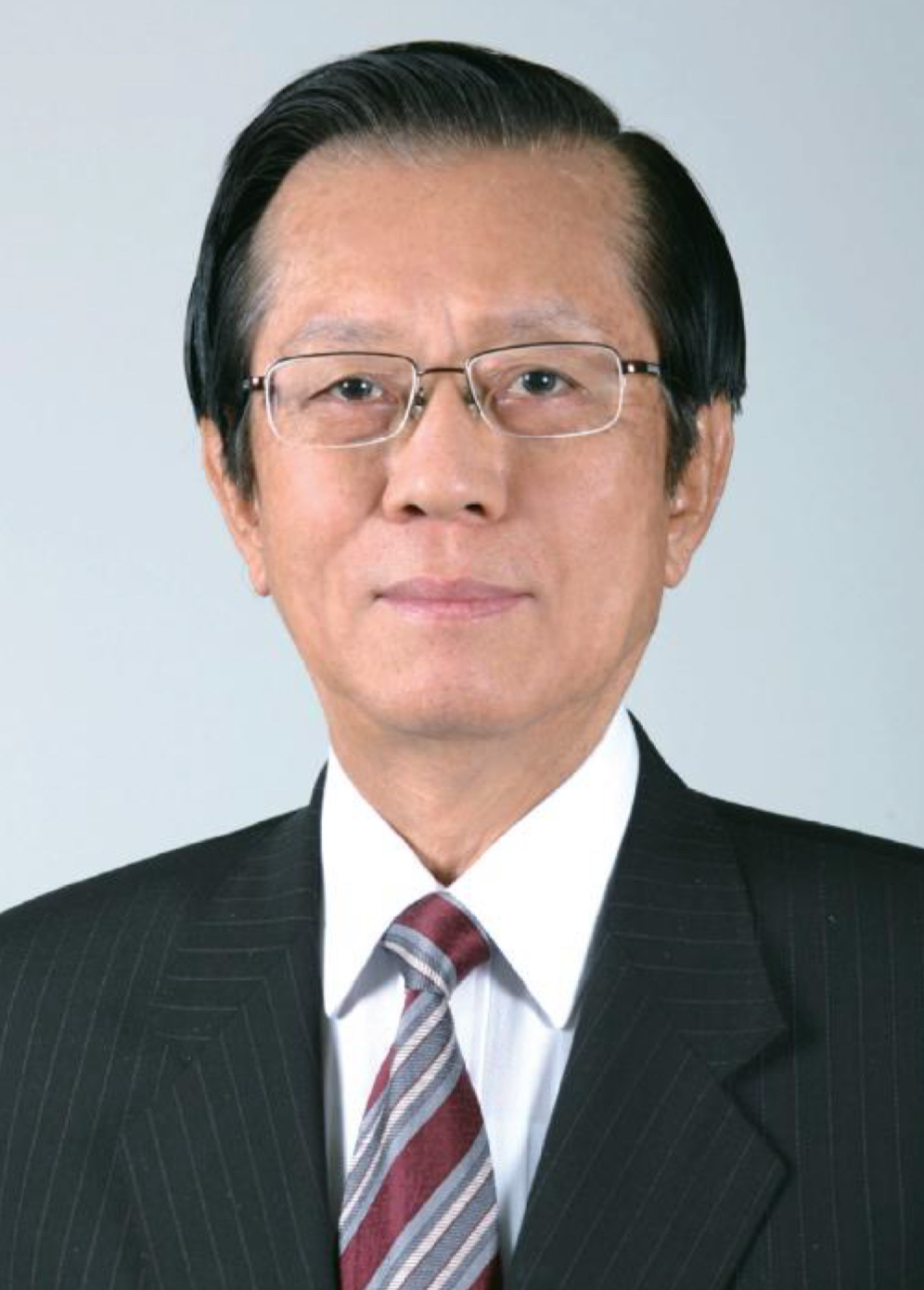
- Official portrait, 2012

28th Secretary-General to the President
- In office 27 September 2012 – 12 February 2015
- President: Ma Ying-jeou
- Deputy: Lo Chih-chiang; Hsiung Kuang-hua
- Preceded by: Tseng Yung-chuan
- Succeeded by: Tseng Yung-chuan

20th Minister of Foreign Affairs
- In office 10 September 2009 – 27 September 2012
- Premier: Wu Den-yih; Sean Chen
- Deputy: Shen Lyu-shun; Tung Kuo-yu
- Preceded by: Francisco Ou
- Succeeded by: David Lin

Ambassador of Taiwan
- to Indonesia: August 2007 – 10 September 2009
- Preceded by Succeeded by: David Lin; Andrew Hsia
- to Australia: 5 September 2000 – 17 December 2005
- Preceded by Succeeded by: Liu Po-lun; Katharine Chang
- to Ireland: August 1988 – September 1991
- Preceded by Succeeded by: Position established Yang Lao-shen

Personal details
- Born: 1 July 1942 Ershui, Changhua, Taiwan, Empire of Japan
- Died: 25 May 2026 (aged 83) Taipei, Taiwan
- Party: Kuomintang
- Education: National Chengchi University (BA)
- Profession: Diplomat

Timothy Yang or Yang Chin-tien (Chinese: 楊進添; pinyin: Yáng Jìntiān; 1 July 1942 – 24 May 2026) was a Taiwanese diplomat and politician who served as Minister of Foreign Affairs and Secretary-General to the President of the Republic of China, under President Ma Ying-Jeou.

== Early life and education ==
Yang was born in Ershui, Changhua County, and earned his bachelor's degree in diplomacy from National Chengchi University.

== Foreign Minister of the Republic of China (Taiwan) ==
When veteran diplomat Francisco Ou resigned from the Cabinet of Premier Liu Chao-Shiuan in September 2009, President Ma Ying-Jeou named Yang to the post, to serve in the newly formed Cabinet of incoming Premier Wu Den-yih. Prior to becoming Foreign Minister, Yang served as representative to Ireland, Australia, and Indonesia. As Minister of Foreign Affairs he also held the position of vice-chairman within the Taiwan Foundation for Democracy.

== ROC Presidential Office Secretary-General ==
=== ROC Presidential Office Building Truck Attack ===
Commenting on the truck attack to the ROC Presidential Office Building in January 2014, Yang said that a team would be established and charged with improving security around the building.

== Death ==
Yang died on 24 May 2026, at the age of 83.

== See also ==
- President of the Republic of China

Government offices
Preceded by David Lin	Taiwanese Representative to Indonesia; 2007–2009	Succeeded by Andrew Hsia
Preceded by Francisco Ou	Minister of Foreign Affairs; 2009–2012	Succeeded by David Lin
Preceded by Tseng Yung-chuan	Secretary-General to the President; 2012–2015	Succeeded by Tseng Yung-chuan
