= Francisca Yu-tsz Chang =

Taiwanese diplomat

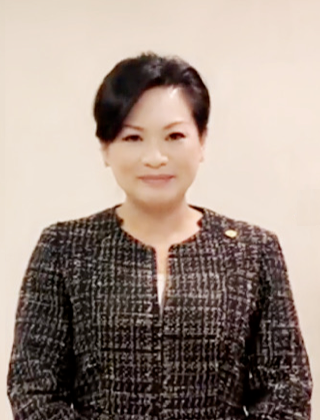

Representative of Taiwan to Peru
- Incumbent
- Assumed office December 2021
- Preceded by: Iván Yueh-jung Lee

Representative of Taiwan to Colombia
- In office October 2020 – December 2021
- Preceded by: José Han
- Succeeded by: Verónica Chih-yun Kuei

Director of the Central America Trade Office
- In office September 2019 – October 2020
- Preceded by: Jaime Chuang
- Succeeded by: Liao Hongda

Personal details
- Education: Fu Jen Catholic University (BA); Tamkang University (MA)
- Occupation: Diplomat
- Awards: Merit to Democracy (2021)

Chang Yu-tsz (Chinese: 張幼慈; pinyin: Zhāng Yòucí), Zhang Youci, better known as Francisca Yu-tsz Chang, is a diplomat of the Republic of China, commonly known as Taiwan. She was the first female representative of the Republic of China in Colombia from 2020 to 2021, currently serving as the representative of the Republic of China to Peru.

== Biography ==
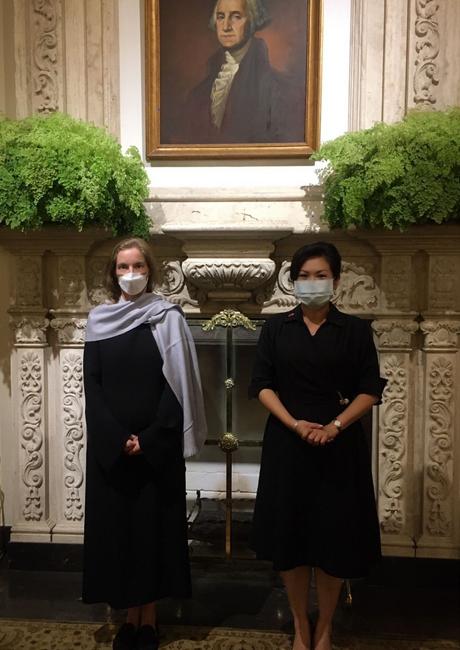
Zhang with U.S. Ambassador to Peru Lisa D. Kenna in 2022.

Zhang graduated from the Spanish Literature Department of Fu Jen Catholic University with a bachelor's degree and the Latin American Institute of Tamkang University with a master's degree.

She served as the second secretary of the embassy in Costa Rica, the head of the training institute for diplomatic and consular personnel of the Ministry of Foreign Affairs, the first-class secretary of the embassy in the Dominican Republic, the Taipei Economic and Cultural Office in Spain, the Ministry of Foreign Affairs' Research and Design Association, Deputy Counselor of the Department of Latin America and the Caribbean of the Ministry of Foreign Affairs, Director of the Central American Economic and Trade Office, and Minister Representative of the Taipei Commercial Office in Colombia. She is currently the Minister Representative of the Taipei Economic and Cultural Office in Peru. (Note: On June 7, 2007, Costa Rica broke off diplomatic relations with the Republic of China. On May 1, 2018, the Dominican Republic broke off diplomatic relations with the Republic of China.) (Note: In September 2012, to unify the internal professional titles of personnel stationed abroad, the Ministry of Foreign Affairs of the Republic of China clearly stipulated that embassies and representative offices should have ambassadors and ministers, and representative offices would still be called representatives and deputy representatives. The head of the representative office has the rank of ambassador from the thirteenth to the fourteenth rank of the special appointment or the senior rank, and the minister representative from the twelfth to the thirteenth rank of the senior rank; the head of the representative office has the rank of the twelfth rank of the general consul, and the deputy director has the rank of deputy consul general from the tenth to the eleventh rank.)

In October 2019, on the occasion of the 30th anniversary of the establishment of diplomatic relations between the Republic of China and Belize, the Belizean Embassy and the Central America Trade Office (CATO) jointly held the "Tastes of Belize" Food Festival, as well as a series of celebratory activities such as an art exhibition.

In April 2021, when US Assistant Secretary of State for Western Hemisphere Affairs Julie J. Chung visited Colombia, she had a video meeting with Zhang, with the two discussed cooperation between the United States and Taiwan in Latin America.

In December 2021, Chairman of the Foreign Affairs and Defense Committee of the Colombian Congress of Colombia, Paola Holguín, presented Zhang with the "Colombia Congress Democracy Medal" (Spanish: Condecoración Orden Mérito a la Democracia). Zhang is also the first female envoy of the Republic of China to the country.
