= Commercial Office of Peru, Taipei =

Commercial Office of Peru in Taipei
- 秘魯駐台北商務辦事處
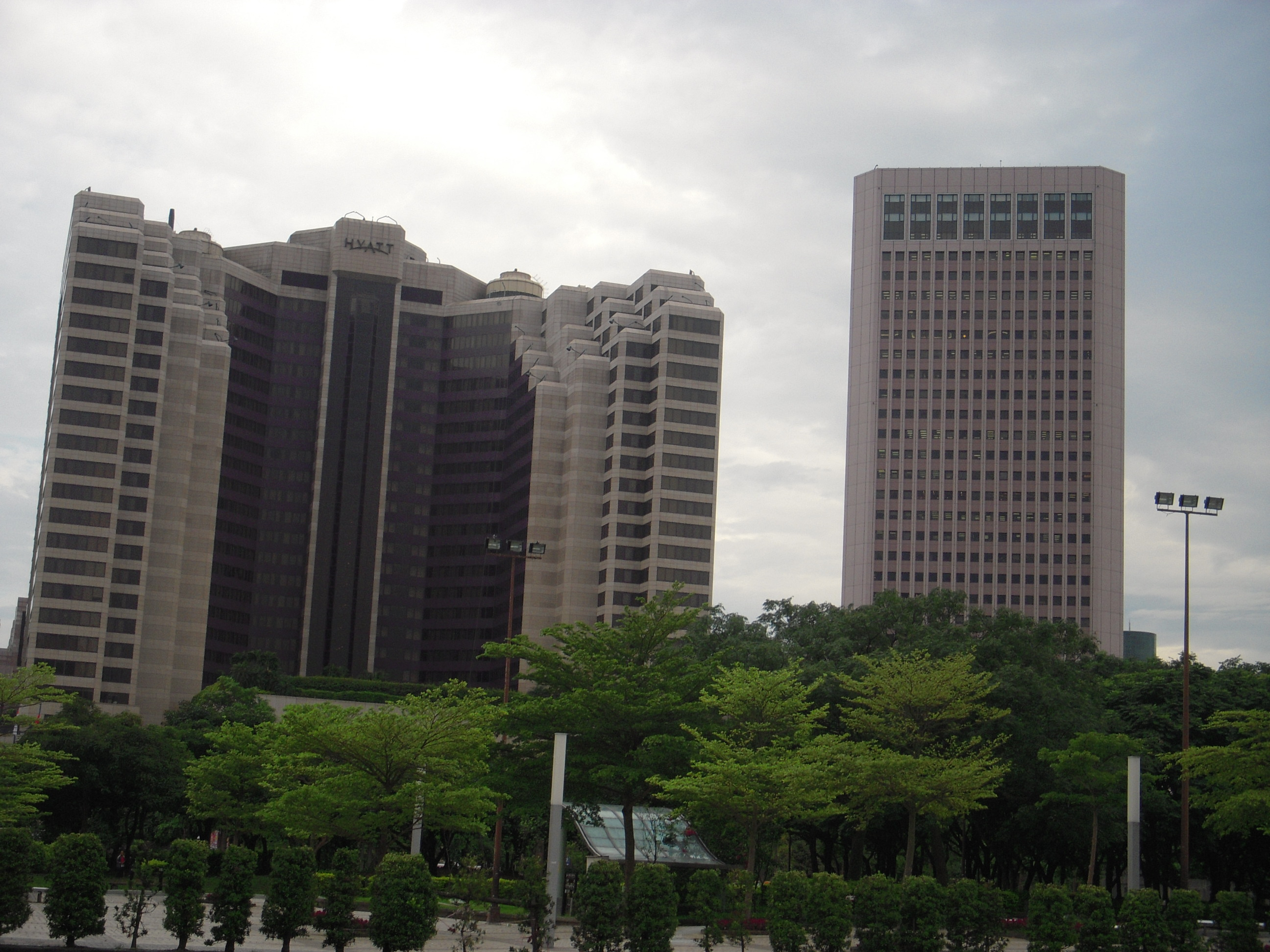
- TWTC International Trade Building (right), where the Office of Peru is located (16F)

Agency overview
- Formed: March 3, 1994
- Jurisdiction: Taiwan
- Headquarters: Xinyi, Taipei, Taiwan
- Agency executive: Director
- Website: Official website

The Commercial Office of Peru in Taipei (Spanish: Oficina Comercial del Perú en Taipei, Chinese: 秘魯駐台北商務辦事處; pinyin: Bìlǔ zhù táiběi shāngwù bànshì chù) represents interests of Peru in Taiwan in the absence of formal diplomatic relations, functioning as a de facto embassy. Its counterpart in Peru is the Taipei Economic and Cultural Office in Peru in Lima.

The Director of the Commercial Office is Fernando Manuel Albareda Del Castillo.

== History ==
Peru maintained a diplomatic mission in Beijing since the establishment of relations in 1874, while China's legation arrived in Lima only after the War of the Pacific. In 1944, the diplomatic status of the two countries was raised to embassy level, and high-level officials of the two countries exchanged frequent visits in the 1950s and 1960s. As a result of the Chinese Civil War, Peru closed its embassy in Beijing in 1946 due to its refusal to recognize the newly established People's Republic of China.

In 1971, the left-wing government of Juan Velasco Alvarado recognized the People's Republic of China and established diplomatic relations, leading the Republic of China to sever its relations with Peru. As such, the Peruvian embassy in Taipei closed on November 3, 1971, with Peru having opened a commercial office in Beijing some time prior.

After a 20-year period without an official representation, Peru opened its representative office in Taipei on March 3, 1994, located in the 16th floor of the TWTC International Trade Building. As of October 2022, Peru is the 5th largest commercial partner of Taiwan in Latin America.

== List of representatives ==
Commercial Economic Counselor of Peru in Chinese Taipei
- Great Seal of Peru
- Incumbent; Juan Luis Kuyeng Ruiz since February 26, 2023
- Ministry of Foreign Affairs
- Formation: 1994

The Commercial Economic Counselor of Peru in Chinese Taipei (Spanish: Consejero Económico Comercial del Perú en China Taipéi) is the de facto diplomatic representative of Peru to the Republic of China (Taiwan) in the absence of formal diplomatic relations since 1971.

Name	Term begin	Term end	Notes
Embassy in Beijing closed in 1946; Embassy in Taipei closed in 1971; Commercial Office opened in 1994
Jaime Cárdenas Pérez	before May 2001	July 2003	
José Carlos Eyzaguirre Bernales	July 15, 2003	after 2004	
Gycs Manuel Gordon Calienes	November 10, 2008	January 27, 2014	
Pedro Agustín Guevara Ballón	October 2015	October 27, 2016	
Luis Fernando Helguero Gonzáles	October 27, 2016	November 9, 2016	
Pedro Agustín Guevara Ballón	November 9, 2016	October 2017	
Juan Luis Kuyeng Ruiz	November 2017	January 2023	
Fernando Manuel Albareda del Castillo	January 30, 2023	February 26, 2023	Accredited from Tokyo.
Juan Luis Kuyeng Ruiz	February 26, 2023	2026	Also accredited to the Commercial Office of Peru in Sydney from 10 to 23 April, 2023.

== See also ==
- Peru–Taiwan relations
- List of diplomatic missions in Taiwan
- List of diplomatic missions of Peru

== Bibliography ==
- Basadre Grohmann, Jorge (2014). Historia de la República del Perú [1822-1933]. Vol. 5. El Comercio. ISBN 978-612-306-353-5.
- Clemente Pecho, Jazmina Lizbeth (2020). La importancia de la rectoría del Ministerio de Relaciones Exteriores del Perú en la celebración de instrumentos internacionales: análisis de la celebración de instrumentos con entidades no estatales en el marco de las relaciones del Perú con China y Taiwán (PDF) (in Spanish). Lima: Academia Diplomática del Perú Javier Pérez de Cuéllar. p. 84.
- García Corrochano, Luis (2019). Las relaciones entre Perú y China en perspectiva histórica (in Spanish). Lima: PUCP. ISBN 9781909890459.
