= 2014 ROC Presidential Office Building truck attack =

Crime in Zhongzheng, Taipei, Taiwan

On 25 January 2014, Chang Ter-cheng (張德正) attempted to drive a 35-tonne truck through the main doors of the Presidential Office Building, Taiwan.

== Chronology ==
At 5:05 am, Chang drove a 35-tonne truck towards the office at a speed of 72 km/h, ramming through four layers of defensive barriers and going up the stairs before being stopped by a bulletproof door leading to the entrance of the presidential office building. Sentries guards of the 211th battalion, ROC Military Police slammed shut the bulletproof door within seconds after they saw the vehicle was heading towards them. It only took five seconds for the truck to hit the building after it left Ketagalan Boulevard. No sentries guarding the gate were injured.

Chang was taken immediately by the police to the National Taiwan University Hospital for treatment of injuries due to the collision. He regained consciousness later.

At the time of the incident, President Ma Ying-jeou was in São Tomé and Príncipe on an official trip.

== Aftermath ==
The Presidential Office invited the National Police Agency, National Security Bureau and Taipei City Police Department for a meeting to discuss on how to better secure the presidential office building in the future.

The Presidential Office had ordered a new and thicker bullet proof door to be installed as soon as possible. A new 18 concrete flower-stands had also been installed in front of the building right after the incident occurred.

Wu Chung-ho (吳仲和), the guard who closed the bulletproof door before the truck slammed into the building, was awarded a medal and given extra vacation days in for his actions.

The Taiwan High Court sentenced the perpetrator to six years in prison on 9 September 2015. In December, the Taipei Distinct Court ordered Chang to pay NT$3.44 million in damages to the Presidential Office. In September 2016, the Taiwan High Court decided that Hau Ming Enterprise Co., Chang's employer at the time of the vehicle-ramming attack, and Chang himself were to split the cost of compensation paid to the Presidential Office. Hau Ming filed an appeal to the Supreme Court, which was heard in January 2017. The Supreme Court upheld the ruling of the High Court.

== Reactions ==
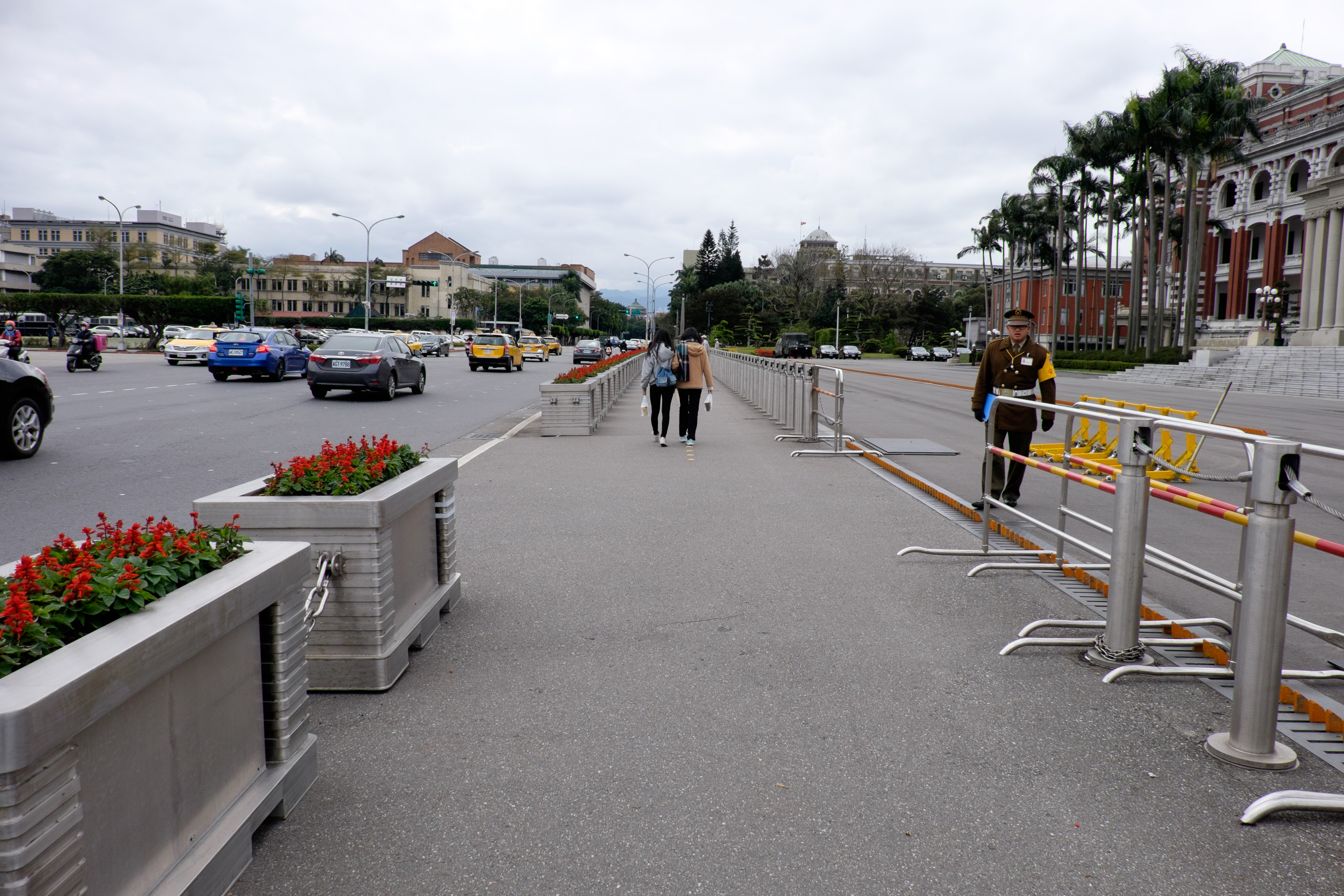
New barriers and fences in front of the Presidential Building as of February 2015

ROC President Ma Ying-jeou asked officials to handle this incident carefully by following all standard operating procedures.

ROC Presidential Office Secretary-General Timothy Yang said that a team will be established and charged with improving security around the building.

Taipei Mayor Hau Lung-pin demanded the police increase security around the Presidential Office Building to avoid similar incidents in the future.
