= Iván Yueh-jung Lee =

Taiwanese diplomat, last ambassador of the ROC to Nicaragua

- 李岳融
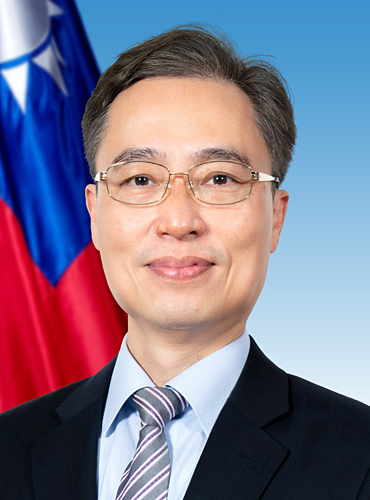

Executive Director of the Congressional Affairs Office of the Ministry of Foreign Affairs of the Republic of China
- Incumbent
- Assumed office September 2022
- Preceded by: Steve C. C. Hsia

Ambassador of the Republic of China to Nicaragua
- In office November 2021 – December 2021
- Preceded by: Jaime Chin-mu Wu
- Succeeded by: Office abolished

Representative of the Republic of China to Peru
- In office November 2018 – November 2021
- Preceded by: Miguel Tsao
- Succeeded by: Francisca Yu-tsz Chang

Personal details
- Education: Wenzao University (BA); Tamkang University (MA)
- Occupation: Diplomat

Lee Yueh-jung (Chinese: 李岳融; pinyin: Lǐ Yuèróng), Li Yuerong, better known as Iván Yueh-jung Lee, is a Taiwanese politician and diplomat. He is the current Executive Director of the Congressional Affairs Office at the Ministry of Foreign Affairs. Previously, He served as his country's final Ambassador to Nicaragua from November to December 2021, prior to the severence of relations between the countries.

== Biography ==
Lee graduated as a Bachelor of Spanish Literature/Master of European Studies from the Spanish Department of Wenzao Ursuline University of Languages and from Tamkang University. He served as Second Secretary of the Embassy in Paraguay, Chief of the Caribbean Section of the Central and South American Department of the Ministry of Foreign Affairs, Chief of the Communication Section of the Protocol Department of the Ministry of Foreign Affairs, Deputy Counselor of the Embassy in Paraguay, deputy director of the Protocol Department of the Ministry of Foreign Affairs, Minister Representative of the Taipei Economic and Cultural Office in Peru, Ambassador to Nicaragua, etc. (Note: In September 2012, in order to unify the internal professional titles of personnel stationed abroad, the Ministry of Foreign Affairs of the Republic of China clearly stipulated that embassies and representative offices should have ambassadors and ministers, and representative offices would still be called representatives and deputy representatives. The head of the representative office has the rank of ambassador from the thirteenth to the fourteenth rank of the special appointment or the senior rank, and the minister representative from the twelfth to the thirteenth rank of the senior rank; the head of the representative office has the rank of the twelfth rank of the general consul, and the deputy director has the rank of deputy consul general from the tenth to the eleventh rank.) He is currently the executive director of the Congressional Affairs Office of the Ministry of Foreign Affairs.

In 2019, Lee wrote an article in support of Taiwan's participation in that year's World Health Assembly organised by the World Health Organization, which was published in Peruvian newspapers on March 31 and April 1 of the same year.

In November 2021, Lee was appointed as the ambassador to Nicaragua and presented a copy of his credentials to the country's Foreign Minister, Denis Moncada. In December, Nicaragua broke off diplomatic relations with the Republic of China before Lee was able to submit the original letter of credentials to the country's president, Daniel Ortega.
