= Liu Zonghan =

Taiwanese diplomat (born 1915)

Ambassador of China to Peru
- In office March 1, 1967 – November 1, 1971
- Preceded by: Senba P.W. Seng
- Succeeded by: Position abolished (ROC)

Personal details
- Born: 1915
- Occupation: Diplomat

Liu Zonghan (Chinese: 劉宗翰; pinyin: Liú Zōnghàn; alternatively Liu Tsung-han), also known as David Tsung Han-liu, is a diplomat of the Republic of China. He was his country's final ambassador to Peru due to the establishment of diplomatic relations between the governments in Lima and Beijing in 1971.

== Biography ==
Liu Zonghan studied in the Department of Foreign Affairs of the National Chengchi University and the 20th Party and Government Class of the Central Training Corps in his early years in China. After graduation, he served as section chief of the government of Duyun County, Guizhou Province, and a staff member of the East Asia Department of the Ministry of Foreign Affairs.

During his career, he went to various countries and served as consul of the consulate general in Kolkata, India; deputy consul of the consulate general in Yangon, Myanmar, deputy consul and acting consul of the consulate in Alexandria, Egypt, and second secretary of the embassy in Egypt; consul general of the consulate general in Guatemala, chargé d'affaires of the legation in Guatemala; counselor of the Embassy in Thailand, and consul general of the consulate general in Johannesburg, South Africa. In 1962, he served as director-general of the Asia, East and Pacific Department of the Ministry of Foreign Affairs.

Starting in 1967, he served as the ambassador of the Republic of China to Peru. In November 1971, the military government of Juan Velasco Alvarado announced that it formally established diplomatic relations with the People's Republic of China. In response to the anticipated announcement, the ROC severed its relations with Peru and closed its embassy in Lima.

Four years later, the anticipated official announcement of Peru's recognition of the People's Republic of China instead of the Republic of China was issued via a memo made public on November 2, 1971. In response, Liu left for Jorge Chávez International Airport on November 4, making a speech before departing to a crowd of several pro-Kuomintang Chinese denouncing the memo and announcing the cessation of diplomatic relations between both countries on the same day. Following his departure, other members of the diplomatic staff also left for Taiwan, closing the embassy by January 1, 1972. On the same day, Chinese associations in Lima celebrated the founding of the Republic of China, then still popular among the Chinese colony in Lima.

After his return to Taipei, he was appointed to serve as the director of the Central and South America Department of the Ministry of Foreign Affairs. In 1972, he served as vice chairman of the Overseas Chinese Affairs Committee. In 1975, he served as the head of the Pacific Cultural and Economic Center in Manila, Philippines.

== Awards ==
- Order of Brilliant Star, 2nd class (May 6, 1967)

== See also ==
- Peru–Taiwan relations
