= List of ambassadors of the Republic of China to Nicaragua =

Coordinates: 12.118826°N 86.263258°W

Ambassador of the Republic of China (Taiwan) to Nicaragua
- National Emblem of the Republic of China
- Ministry of Foreign Affairs
- Style: His Excellency
- Inaugural holder: Jonyor C. Liao
- Formation: 1930
- Final holder: Iván Yueh-Jung Lee
- Abolished: 2021

The Republic of China ambassador in Managua was the official representative of the Government in Taipei to the Government of Nicaragua. There was a representative of the Government in Beijing to the Government of Nicaragua between 1985 and 1990, and again from 2021 onwards (see List of ambassadors of China to Nicaragua).

== List of representatives ==
Diplomatic agrément/Diplomatic accreditation	ambassador	Chinese language zh:中国驻尼加拉瓜大使列表	Observations	Premier of the Republic of China	President of Nicaragua	Term end
1930	Jonyor C. Liao	廖颂扬	Chargé d'affaires and consultant until the 1931 Nicaragua earthquake.	Chiang Kai-shek	José María Moncada Tapia	1931
1932			Consul	Chiang Kai-shek	José María Moncada Tapia	1935
1935	Sung Hun-chi		Consul general	Wang Jingwei	Juan Bautista Sacasa	1955
1936	Lin Jen-chou		Consul general	Chiang Kai-shek	Carlos Alberto Brenes Jarquín	
1950	Sung Hang-chee		Consul general	Chen Cheng	Anastasio Somoza García	
May 1, 1955			The Consulate was elevated to Legation level in 1955.	Yu Hung-chun	Anastasio Somoza García	
1960	Kiang Si-ling		Chargé d'affaires	Chen Cheng	Luis Somoza Debayle	1961
July 25, 1961			25. The Legislative Yuan ratified a 10-year cultural convention between the Republic of China and the Republic of Nicaragua.	Chen Cheng	Luis Somoza Debayle	
December 23, 1971	Fang Chin-yen		At 40, Fang Chin-yen was the youngest ambassador of this country.	Yen Chia-kan	Anastasio Somoza Debayle	1975
August 6, 1979	Ting Ke		Chargé d'affaires	Sun Yun-suan	Francisco Urcuyo Maliaños	
September 6, 1979	Hsueh Jen-yang		Ambassador	Sun Yun-suan	Francisco Urcuyo Maliaños	
September 10, 1979	Mao Chi-hsien	zh:毛起鹇	Ambassador	Sun Yun-suan	Francisco Urcuyo Maliaños	1983
August 24, 1984	Francisco Ou	歐鴻鍊	Or Hung-lien	Yu Kuo-hwa	Francisco Urcuyo Maliaños	December 23, 1985
February 17, 1991	Lin Ki-tseng	林基正	Ambassador	Hau Pei-tsun	Violeta Barrios de Chamorro	1992
August 6, 1998	Agustín C. T. Wu	吳慶堂	Ambassador	Vincent Siew	Arnoldo Alemán	
January 26, 1999	Tsai Teh-san	蔡德三	Antonio T. S. Tsai	Vincent Siew	Arnoldo Alemán	2002
December 14, 2007	Ming-Ta Hung	洪明達		Chang Chun-hsiung	Daniel Ortega	
January 6, 2011	Jaime Chin-mu Wu	吳進木		Wu Den-yih	Daniel Ortega	May 22, 2011
July 28, 2011	Ingrid Ying-Whei Hsing	邢瀛輝		Sean Chen	Daniel Ortega	December 27, 2014
May 25, 2015	Rolando Jer-ming Chuang	莊哲銘		Mao Chi-kuo	Daniel Ortega	June 4, 2016
May 1, 2017	Jaime Chin-mu Wu	吳進木		Lin Chuan	Daniel Ortega	September 28, 2021
November 2021	Iván Yueh-Jung Lee	李岳融		Lai Ching-te	Daniel Ortega	December 2021
