= List of diplomatic missions of Taiwan =

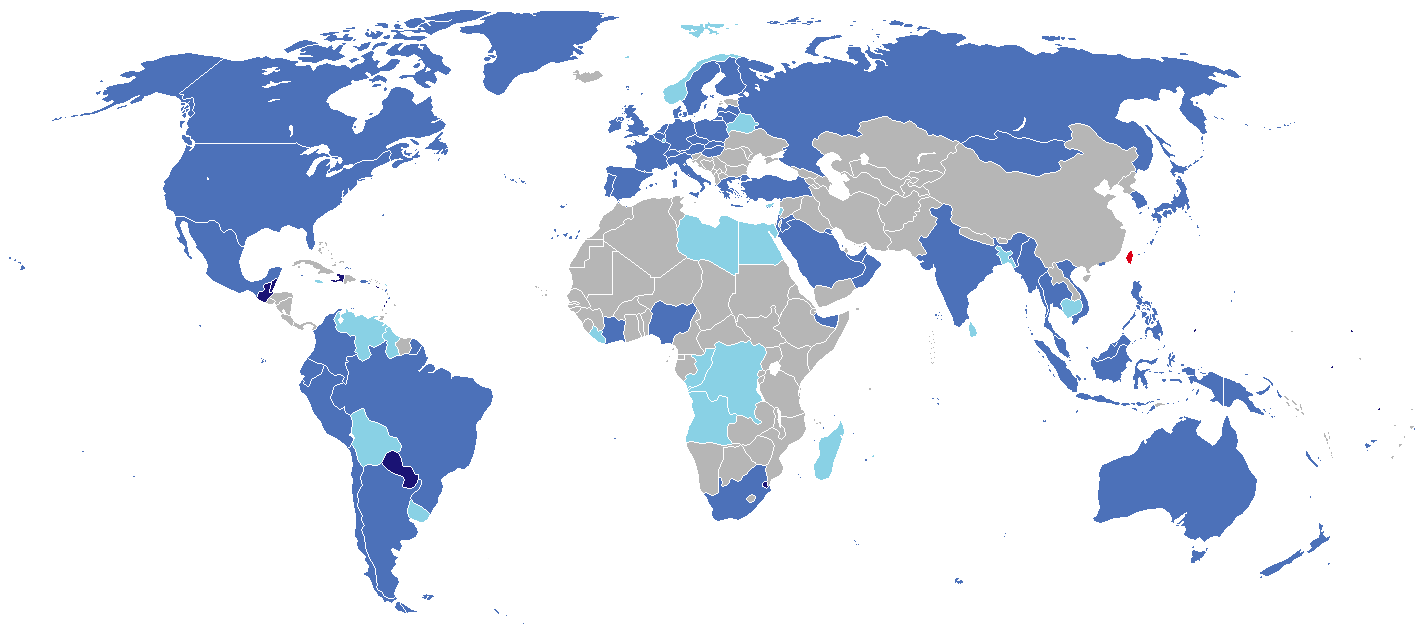
Map of countries and territories with Taiwanese diplomatic missions Republic of China (Taiwan) Has formal embassy Has representative missions Formerly had missions

Taiwan, officially the Republic of China, has 112 diplomatic and representative missions across the world as of December 2024. (Note: This figure includes 110 diplomatic posts and permanent missions, official and unofficial, outside of China as of December 2024, and two offices in Hong Kong and Macau. The Taipei Representative Office in the EU and Belgium is counted as one mission.) Because many countries have a One China Policy that acknowledges the existence of a single China with varying attitudes toward Taiwan's status, no country simultaneously holds diplomatic relations with the Republic of China (Taiwan) and the People's Republic of China. As most countries have changed their recognition to the latter over time, only 13 of Taiwan's diplomatic missions have official status, consisting of twelve embassies and one Apostolic Nunciature. This makes Taiwan one of the few countries in the world that has resident embassies in all of the states with which it has formal diplomatic relations.

Despite these barriers, about 60 United Nations members maintain relations with Taiwan on an unofficial basis. In addition, Taiwan has official relations with the Order of Malta, a UN observer entity and Somaliland, a state with limited recognition. To serve these locations and other places throughout the world, 91 semi-official representative offices are utilized for matters that would otherwise be handled by embassies or consulates. Their heads are still appointed by the Ministry of Foreign Affairs, making them de facto missions. Owing to pressure from the People's Republic, most of these offices cannot operate under either the country's official or common name, using the name of the capital Taipei instead to avoid addressing Taiwan's political status. There have recently been two notable exceptions to this; the offices in Somaliland (opened 2020) and Lithuania (2021) use "Taiwan" in their names. Taiwan also maintains permanent missions to the European Union and the World Trade Organization, with the latter under the name "Separate Customs Territory of Taiwan, Penghu, Kinmen and Matsu".

Taiwan has also established informal representation in China's two Special Administrative Regions. In Hong Kong, the Taipei Economic and Cultural Office, Hong Kong provides services similar to a consulate, while relations to Macau are handled by the Taipei Economic and Cultural Office, Macau. In addition, under a mechanism established in 2010, the Taiwanese government is directly represented in negotiations with its Hong Kong counterpart by the Taiwan–Hong Kong Economic and Cultural Co-operation Council (ECCC), with the latter operating a similar office in reciprocation. Taiwan also maintains unofficial diplomatic exchanges with China using the Straits Exchange Foundation, but the organization does not have a physical presence in mainland China as of 2020.

== Current missions ==
=== Embassies and Consulates-general ===
Host country	Reigion	Host city	Mission	Year Opened	Jurisdiction	Ref.
Belize	Americas	Belize City	Embassy	1989		
Eswatini	Africa	Mbabane	Embassy	1968	Countries: Mozambique	
Guatemala	Americas	Guatemala City	Embassy (Note: Initially consulate, promoted to legation in 1954 and embassy in 1960)	1935	Countries: Dominican Republic (Note: Dominican Republic is served by both the Embassy in Guatemala and the representative office in Miami, United States.); El Salvador	
Haiti	Americas	Port-au-Prince	Embassy (Note: Initially legation, promoted to embassy in 1965)	1960		
Holy See	Europe	Rome (Note: Located outside Vatican territory in Rome, Italy, a country in which Taiwan is not recognized.)	Embassy (Note: Started as legation, promoted to embassy in 1959)	1943	Countries: Sovereign Military Order of Malta	
Marshall Islands	Oceania	Majuro	Embassy	1998	Countries: Federated States of Micronesia	
Palau	Oceania	Koror	Embassy	1999		
Paraguay	Americas	Asunción	Embassy	1959		
Paraguay	Americas	Ciudad del Este	Consulate-general	1988		
Saint Kitts and Nevis	Americas	Basseterre	Embassy	1984	Countries: Antigua and Barbuda; Jamaica; Territories: Anguilla; Cayman Islands (Note: Served by both the Embassy in Saint Kitts and Nevis and the representative office in United Kingdom.); Montserrat; Saba; Saint Barthélemy; Saint Martin; Sint Eustatius; Sint Maarten; British Virgin Islands	
Saint Lucia	Americas	Gros Islet	Embassy	2007	Countries: Barbados; Dominica; Territories: Guadeloupe; Martinique	
Saint Vincent and the Grenadines	Americas	Kingstown	Embassy	1983	Countries: Grenada; Guyana; Suriname; Trinidad and Tobago	
Tuvalu	Oceania	Funafuti	Embassy	1998		

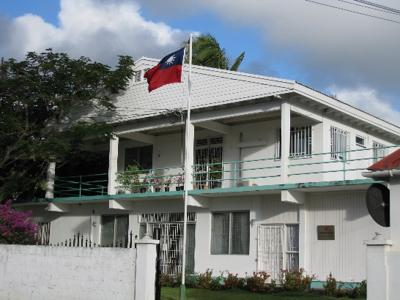
Embassy in Basseterre

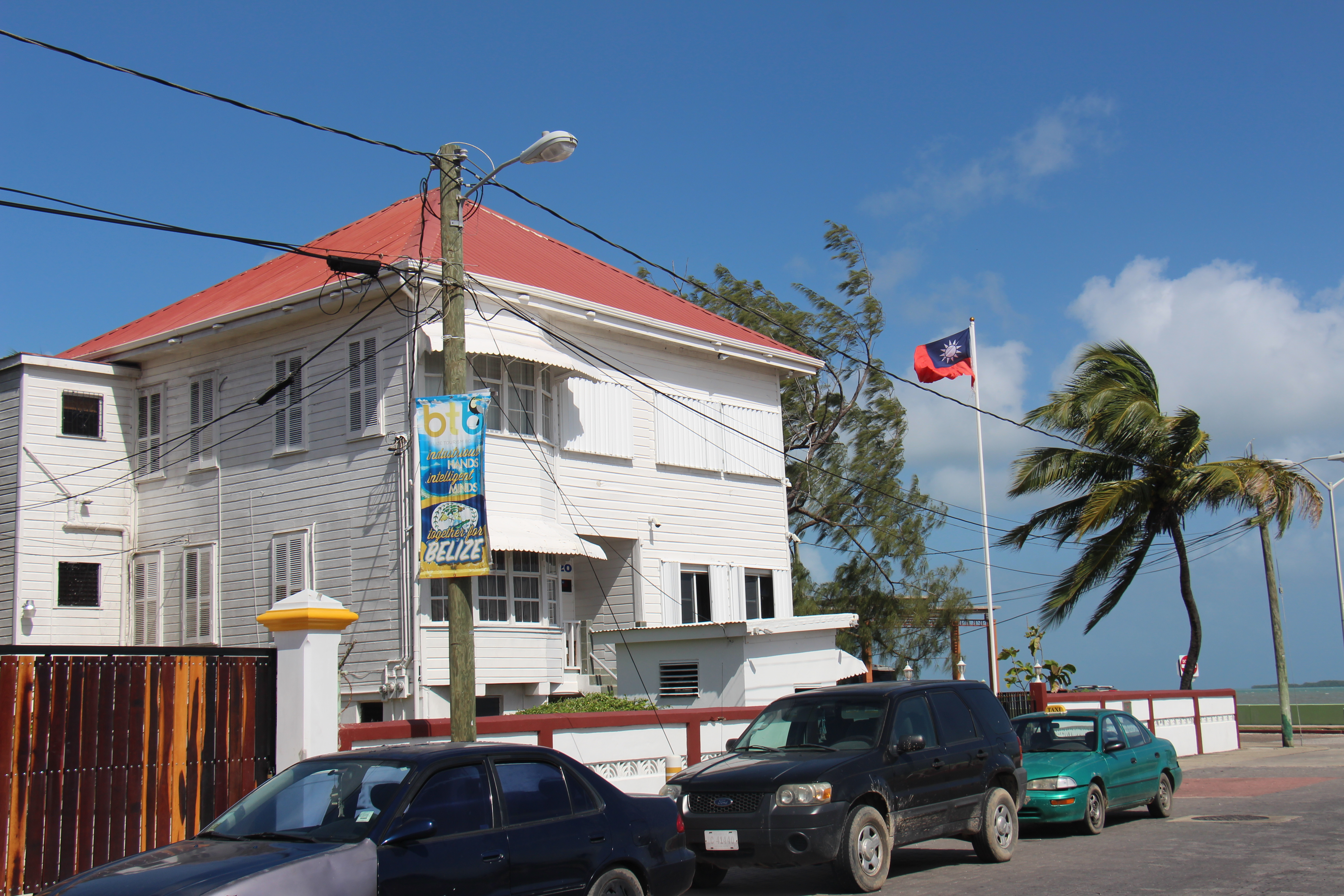
Embassy in Belize City

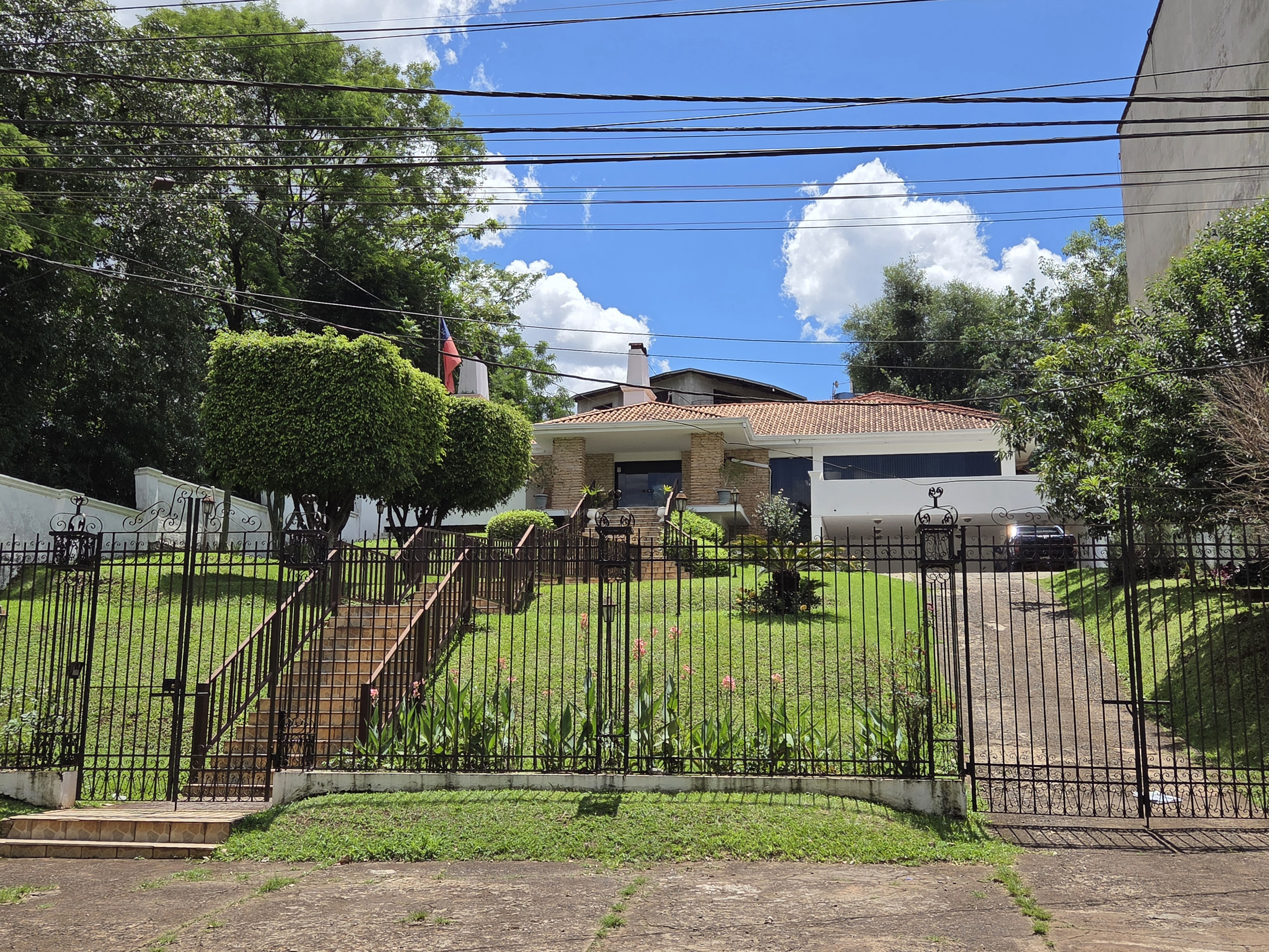
Consulate-General in Ciudad del Este

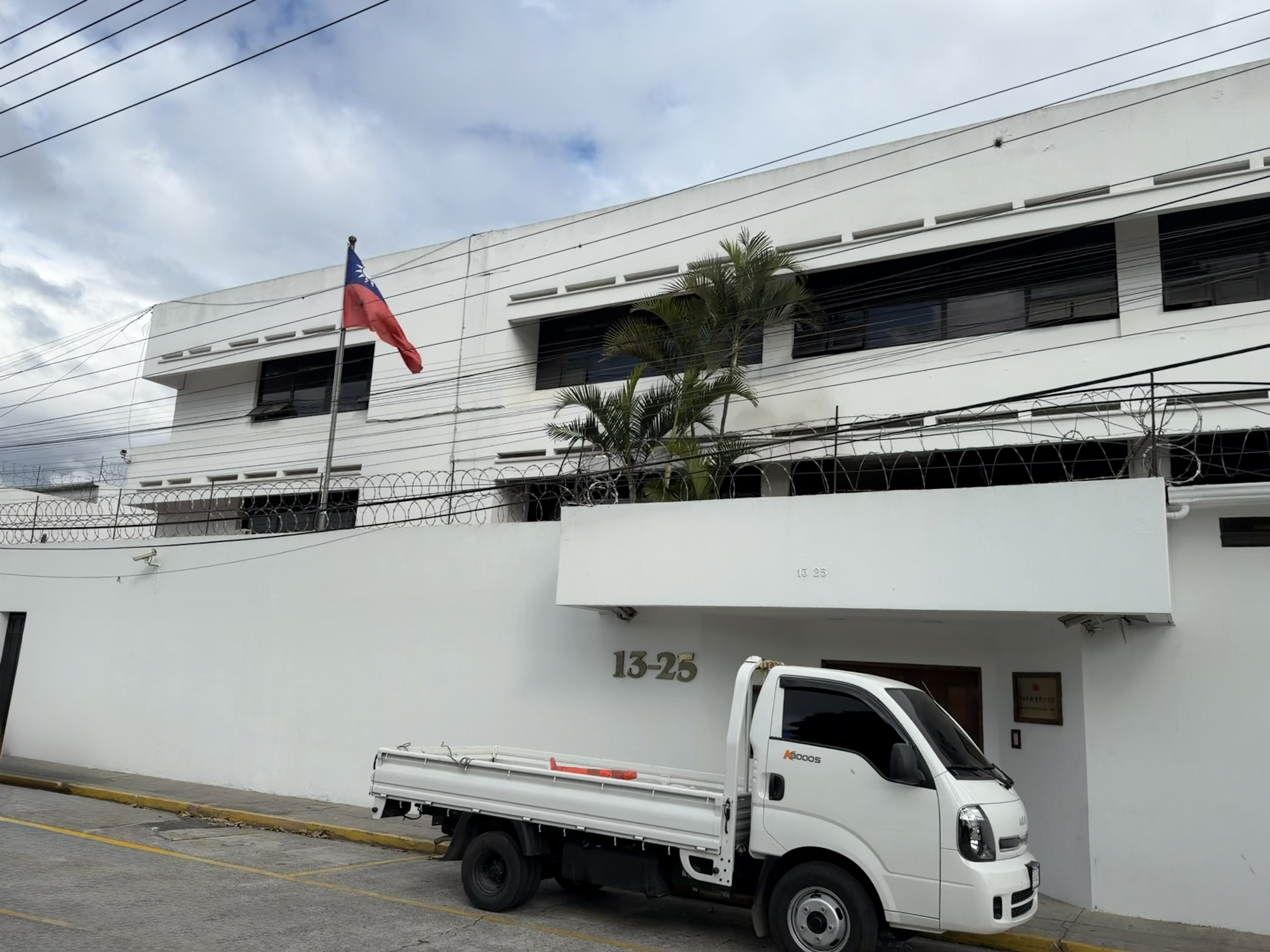
Embassy in Guatemala City

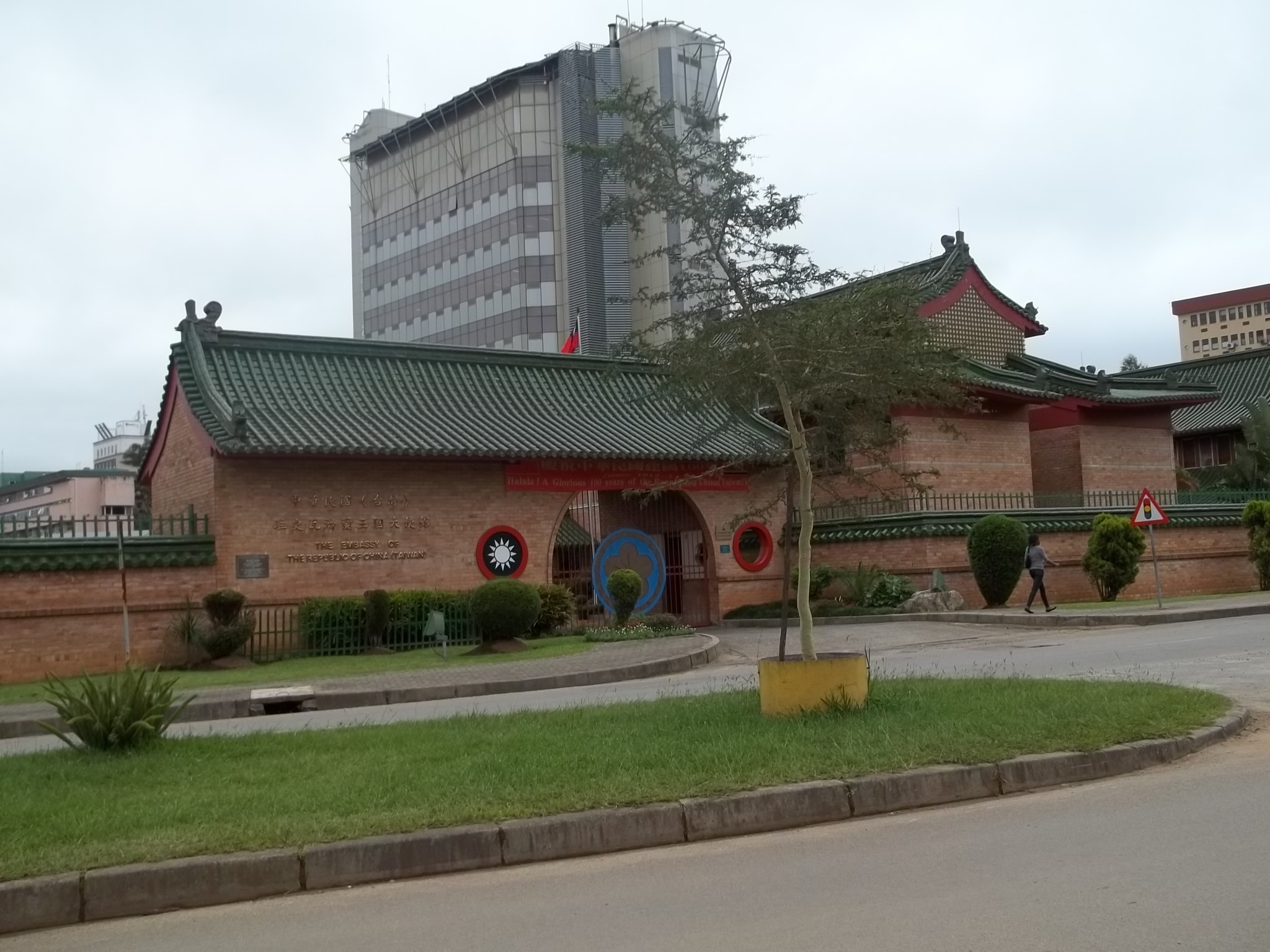
Embassy in Mbabane

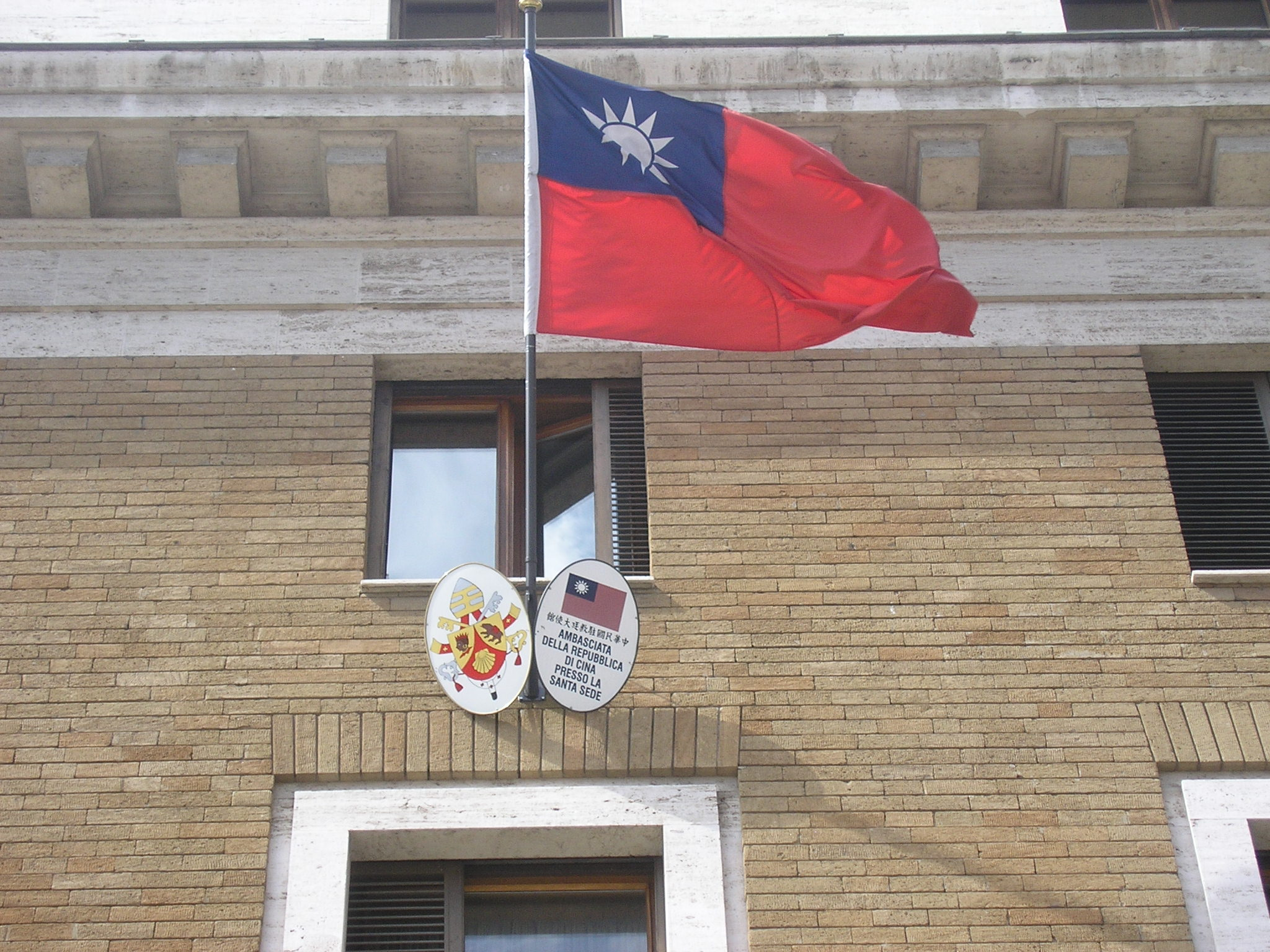
Embassy to the Holy See in Rome

=== Representative Offices ===
Sources:

=== Africa ===
Host country	Host city	Mission	Year Opened	Jurisdiction	Ref.
Ivory Coast	Abidjan	Representative Office	2022 (Note: Previously closed in 2017)		
Nigeria	Lagos (Note: Previously located in Abuja from 2001 to 2018)	Trade Office	1991	Countries: Benin (Note: Served by both the representative office in Nigeria and representative offices in Paris and Aix-en-Provence, France.); Burkina Faso (Note: Burkina Faso is served by both the representative offices in France and Nigeria.); Cameroon (Note: Cameroon is served by the representative offices in Belgium, France and Nigeria.); Republic of the Congo; Gambia; Ghana (Note: Served by both the representative offices in Nigeria and United Kingdom.); Liberia; Sierra Leone	
Somaliland	Hargeisa	Representative Office	2020	Countries: Djibouti (Note: Served by both the representative offices in Saudi Arabia and Somaliland.); Ethiopia; Kenya (Note: Served by both the representative offices in Somaliland and South Africa.); Uganda	
South Africa	Pretoria	Liaison Office	1998	Countries: Angola; Botswana; Burundi (Note: Served by the representative offices in Belgium, France and South Africa.); Comoros (Note: Comoros is served by both the representative offices in France and South Africa.); Eritrea (Note: served by both the representative offices in South Africa and United Arab Emirates.); Kenya; Lesotho; Madagascar; Malawi; Mauritius; Rwanda; Seychelles (Note: Seychelles is served by both the representative offices in South Africa and United Kingdom.); Somalia; Tanzania; Uganda; Zambia; Zimbabwe	
South Africa	Cape Town	Liaison Office	1998	Countries: Namibia	

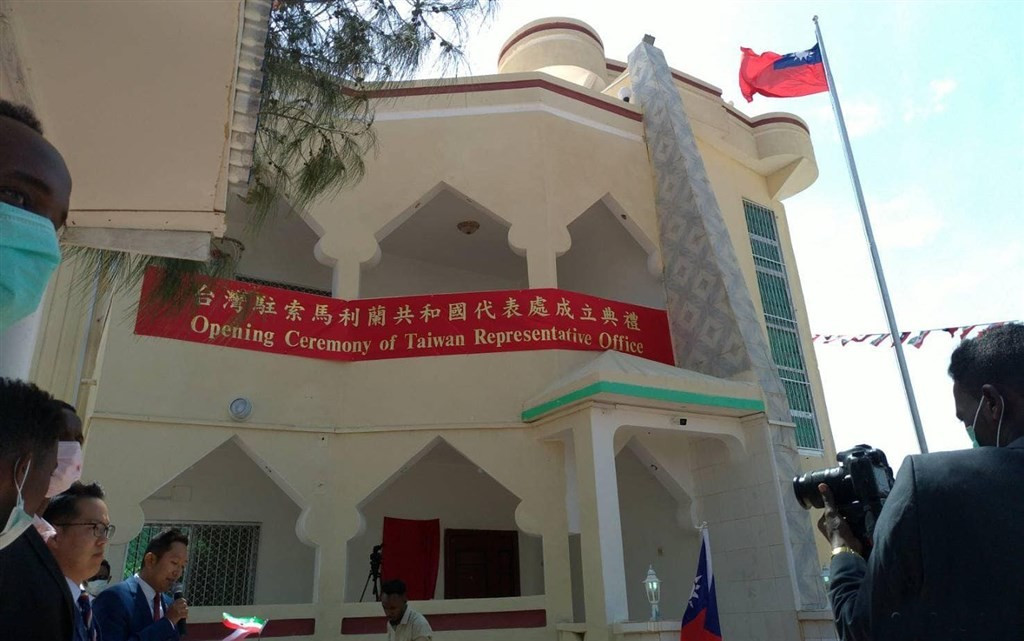
Representative Office in Hargeisa

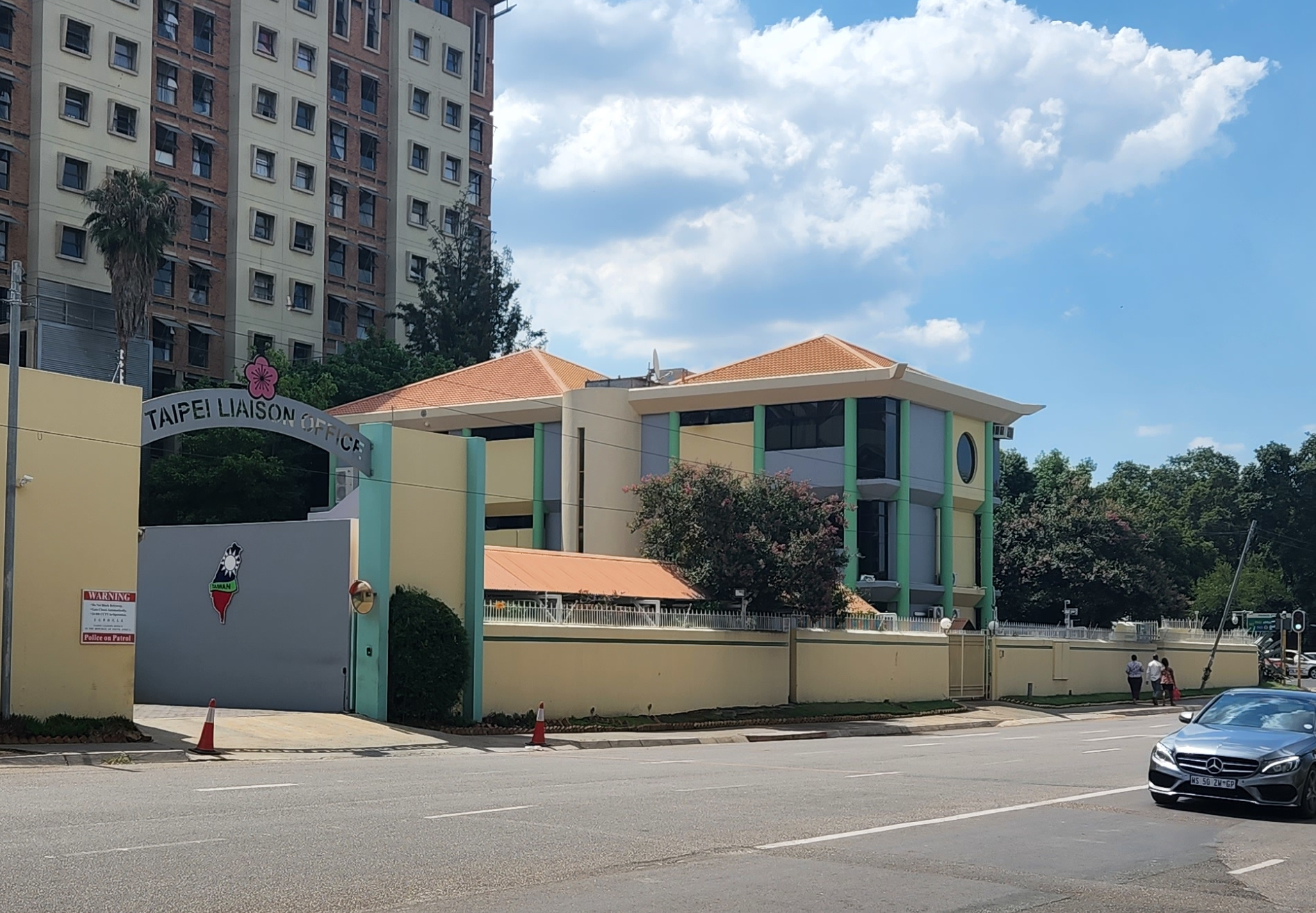
Liaison Office in Pretoria

=== Americas ===
Host country	Host city	Mission	Year Opened	Jurisdiction	Ref.
Argentina	Buenos Aires	Commercial and Cultural Office	1972	Countries: Uruguay	
Brazil	Brasília	Economic and Cultural Office	1992		
Brazil	São Paulo	Economic and Cultural Office	1975		
Canada	Ottawa	Economic and Cultural Office	1993	Territories: Saint Pierre and Miquelon	
Canada	Montreal	Economic and Cultural Office	2023		
Canada	Toronto	Economic and Cultural Office	1991		
Canada	Vancouver	Economic and Cultural Office	1991		
Chile	Santiago	Economic and Cultural Office	1975	Territories: Falkland Islands (Note: Falkland Islands is served by both the representative offices in Chile and United Kingdom.)	
Colombia	Bogotá	Commercial Office	1980	Countries: Cuba; Panama; Venezuela	
Ecuador	Quito	Commercial Office	1977		
Mexico	Mexico City	Economic and Cultural Office	1989		
Peru	Lima	Economic and Cultural Office	1978	Countries: Bolivia	
United States	Washington, D.C.	Economic and Cultural Representative Office	1979	Countries: Cuba; Bahamas; Grenada; Antigua and Barbuda; Trinidad and Tobago; Dominica; Nicaragua	
United States	Atlanta	Economic and Cultural Office	1979		
United States	Boston	Economic and Cultural Office	1982		
United States	Chicago	Economic and Cultural Office	1979		
United States	Denver (Note: Moved from Kansas City office that was originally opened in 1985)	Economic and Cultural Office	2015		
United States	Hagåtña, Guam	Economic and Cultural Office	1991 (Note: Closed between 2017 and 2020)	Territories: Northern Mariana Islands	
United States	Honolulu	Economic and Cultural Office	1979	Territories: American Samoa; United States Minor Outlying Islands	
United States	Houston	Economic and Cultural Office	1979		
United States	Los Angeles	Economic and Cultural Office	1979		
United States	Miami	Economic and Cultural Office	1988	Countries: Bahamas; Dominican Republic; Territories: Bermuda; Puerto Rico; Turks and Caicos Islands (Note: Turks and Caicos Islands is served by both the representative offices in United Kingdom and Miami, United States.); United States Virgin Islands	
United States	New York City	Economic and Cultural Office	1979		
United States	San Francisco	Economic and Cultural Office	1979		
United States	Seattle	Economic and Cultural Office	1979		

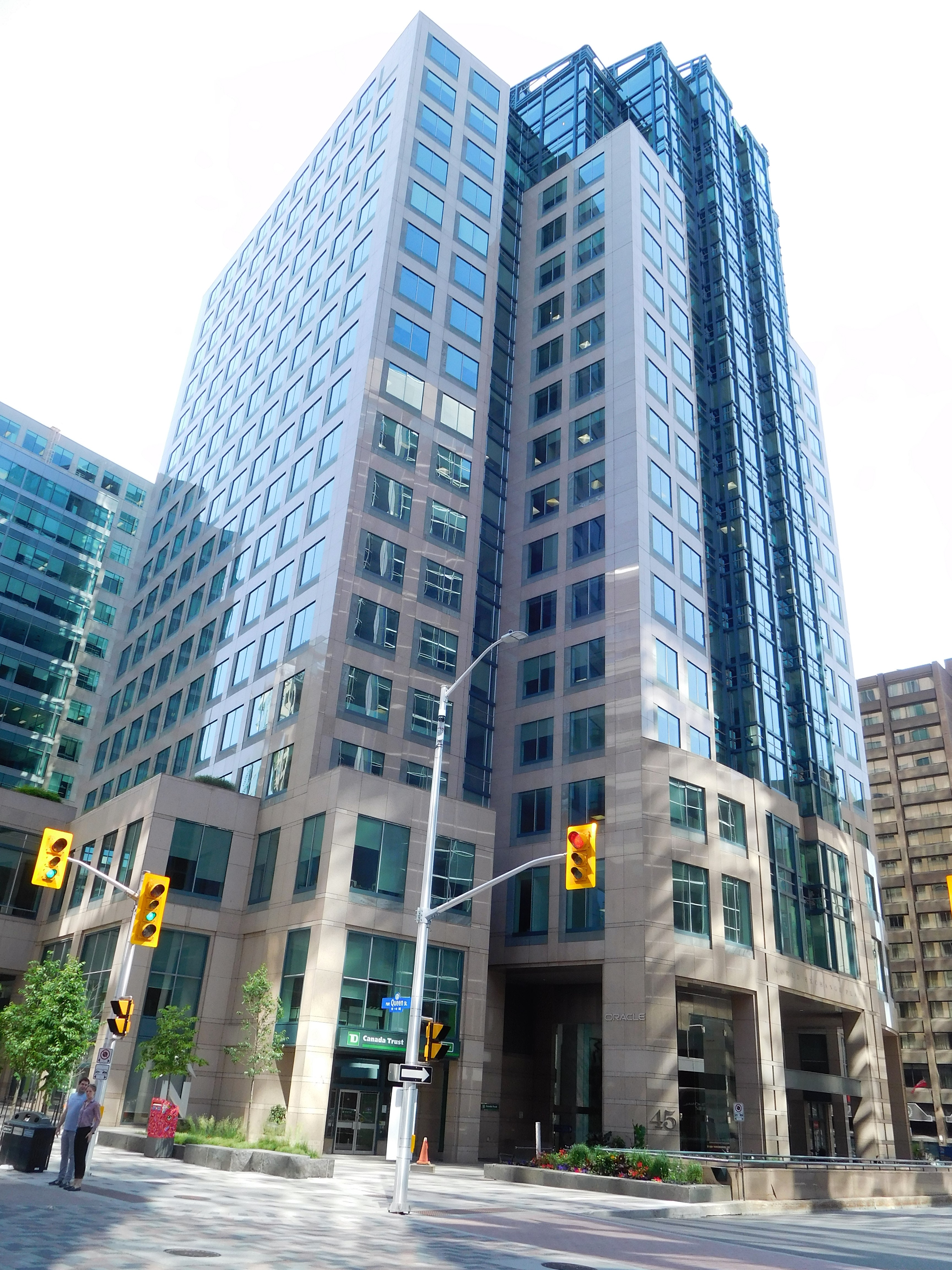
Building hosting the Economic and Cultural Office in Ottawa

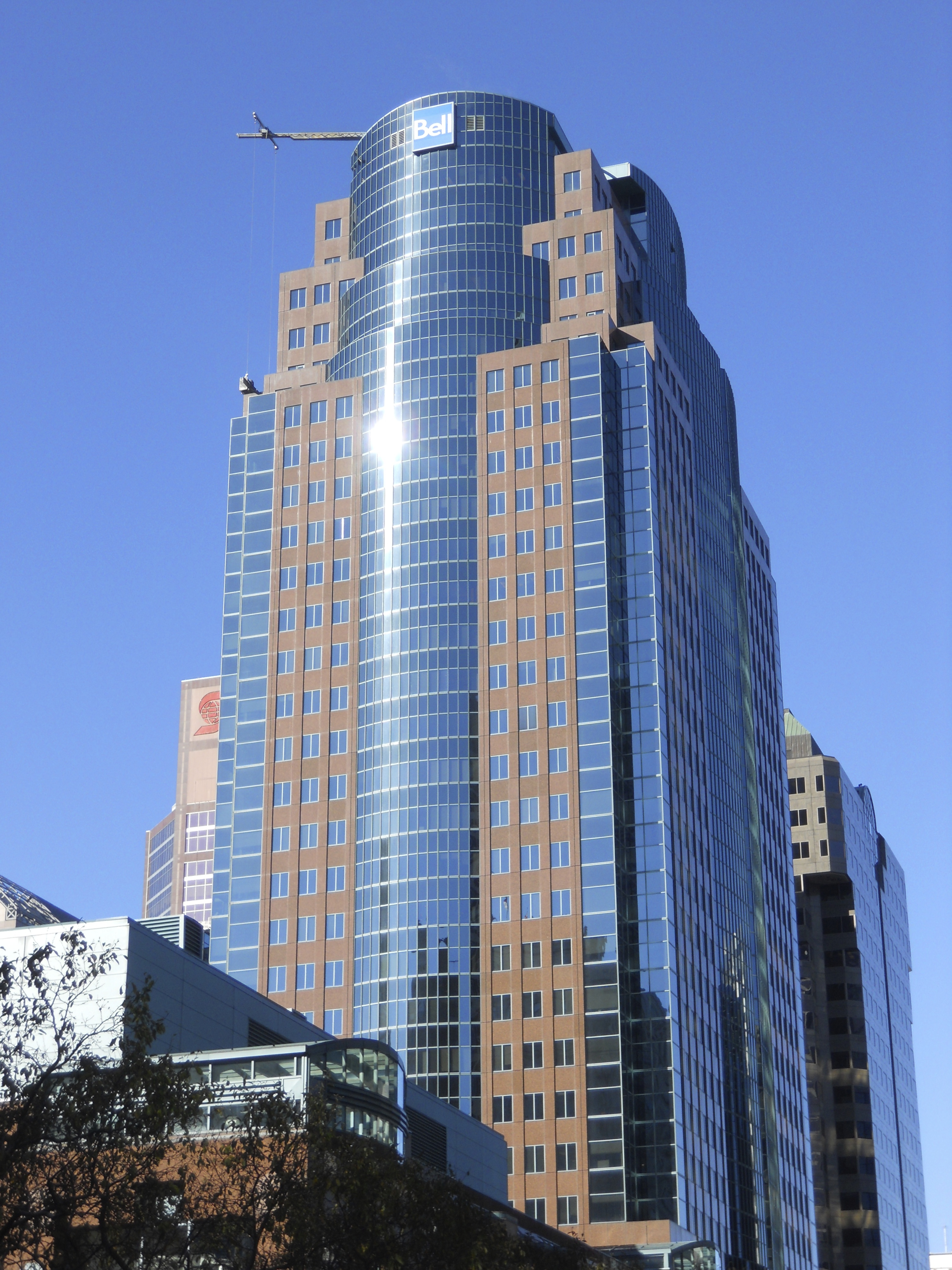
Building hosting the Economic and Cultural Office in Montreal

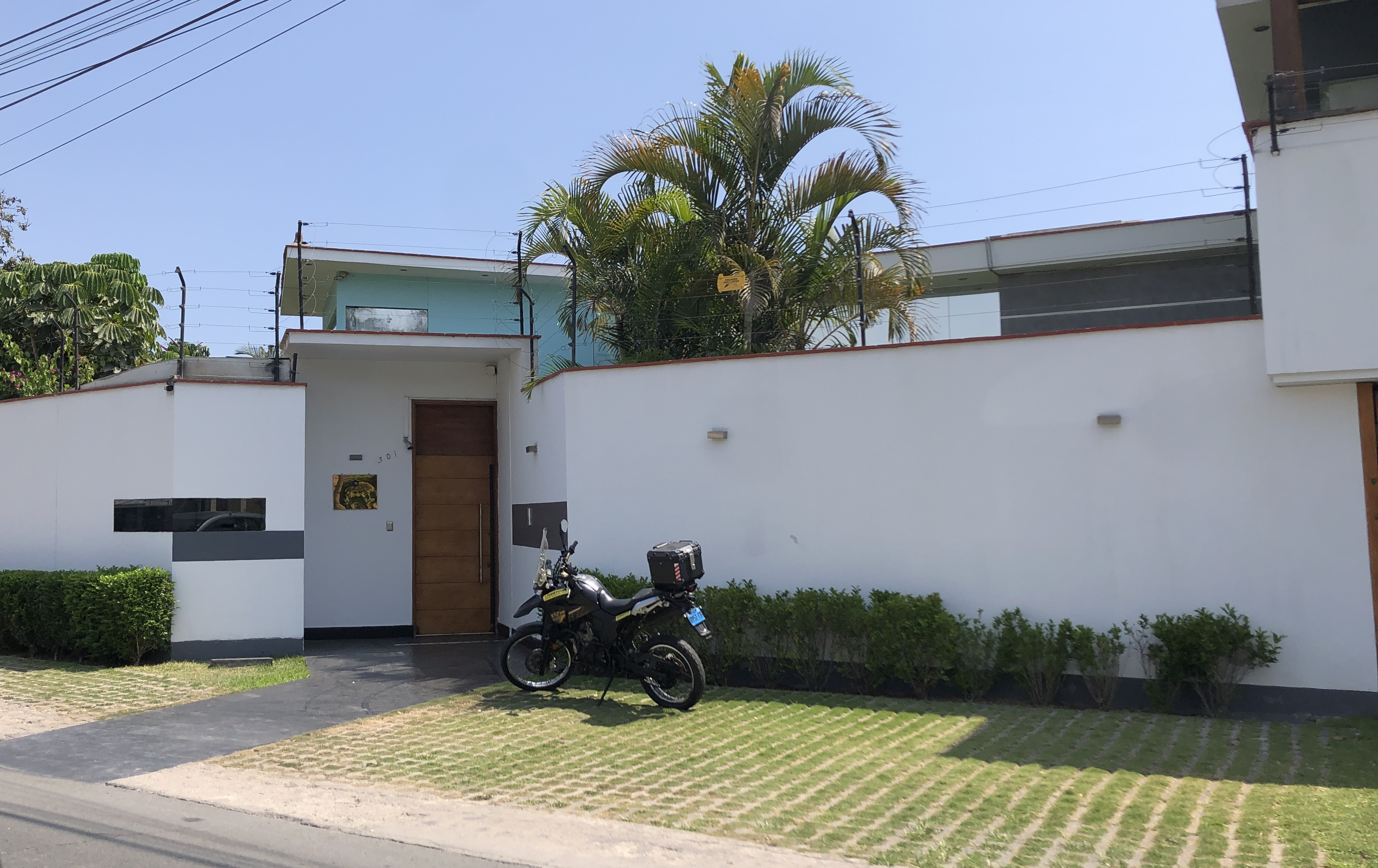
Economic and Cultural Office in Lima

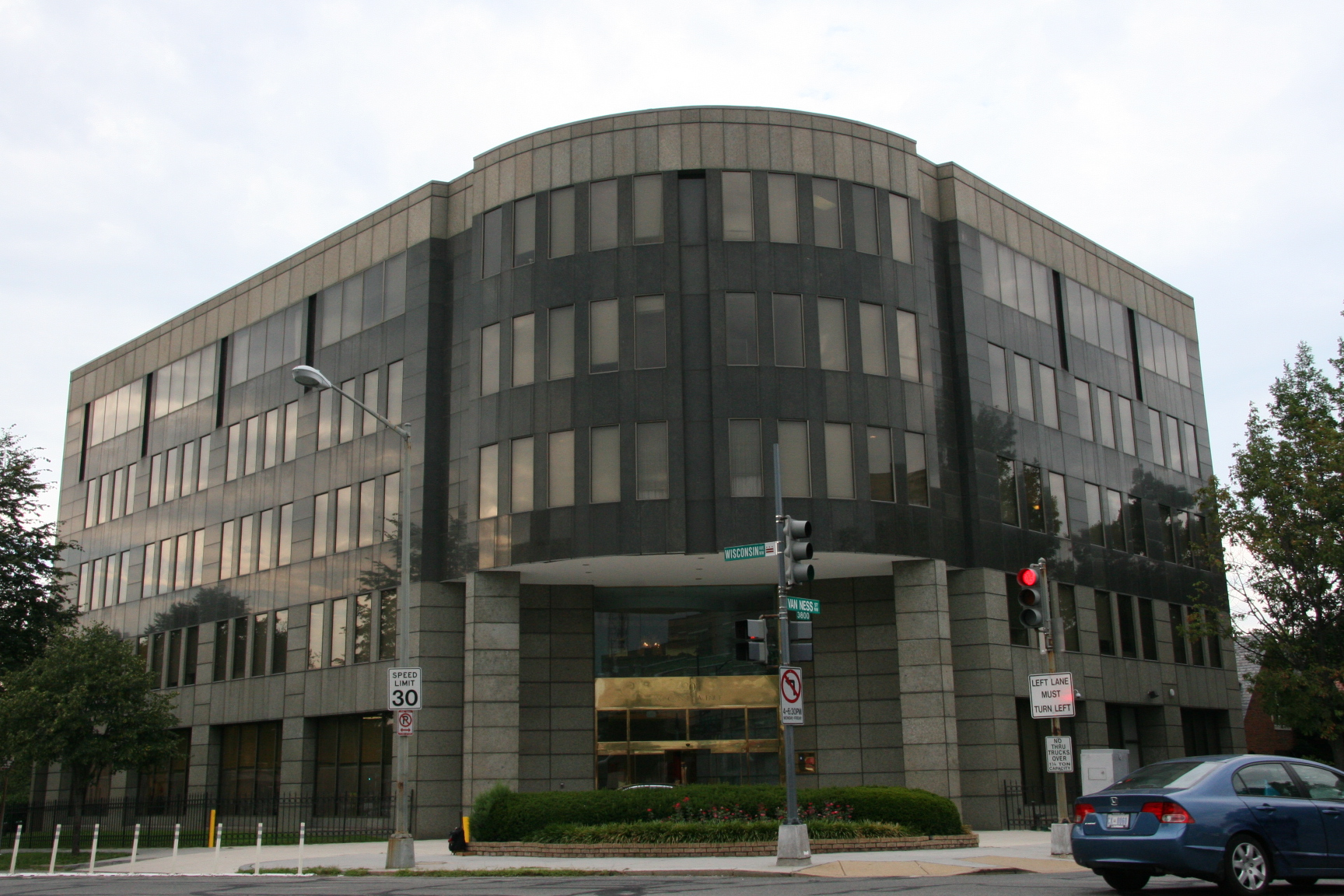
Economic and Cultural Representative Office in Washington, D.C.

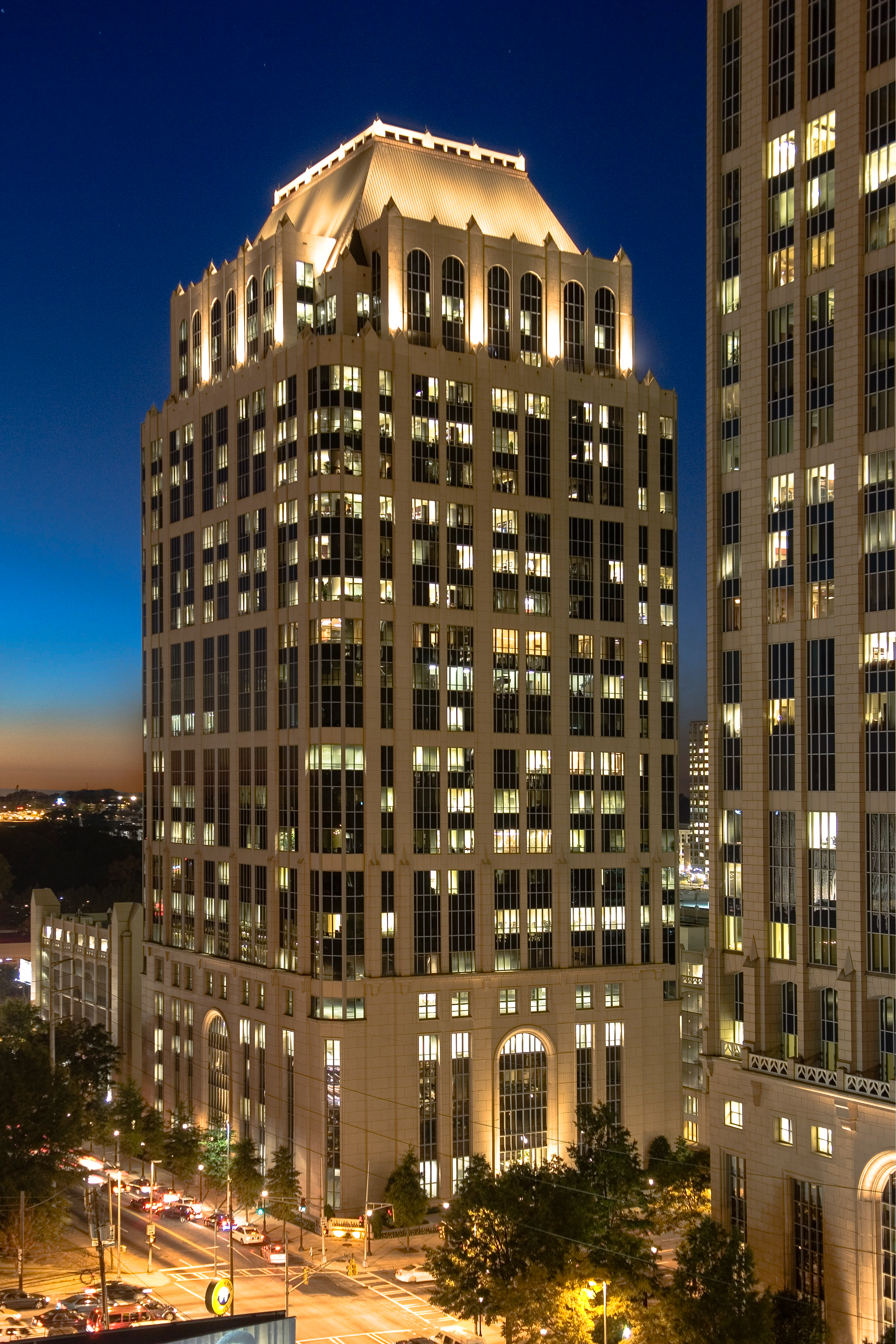
Building hosting the Economic and Cultural Office in Atlanta

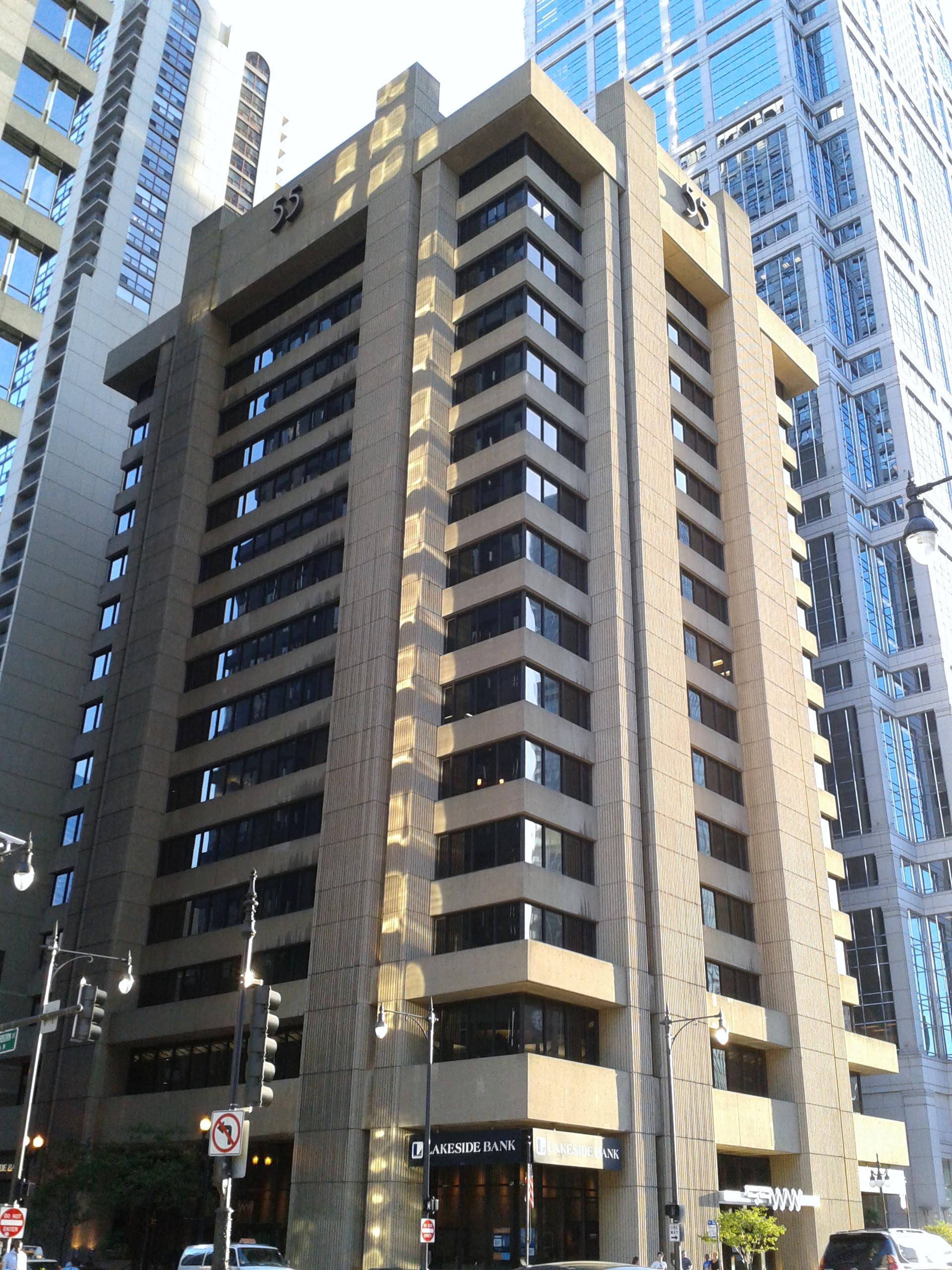
Building hosting the Economic and Cultural Office in Chicago

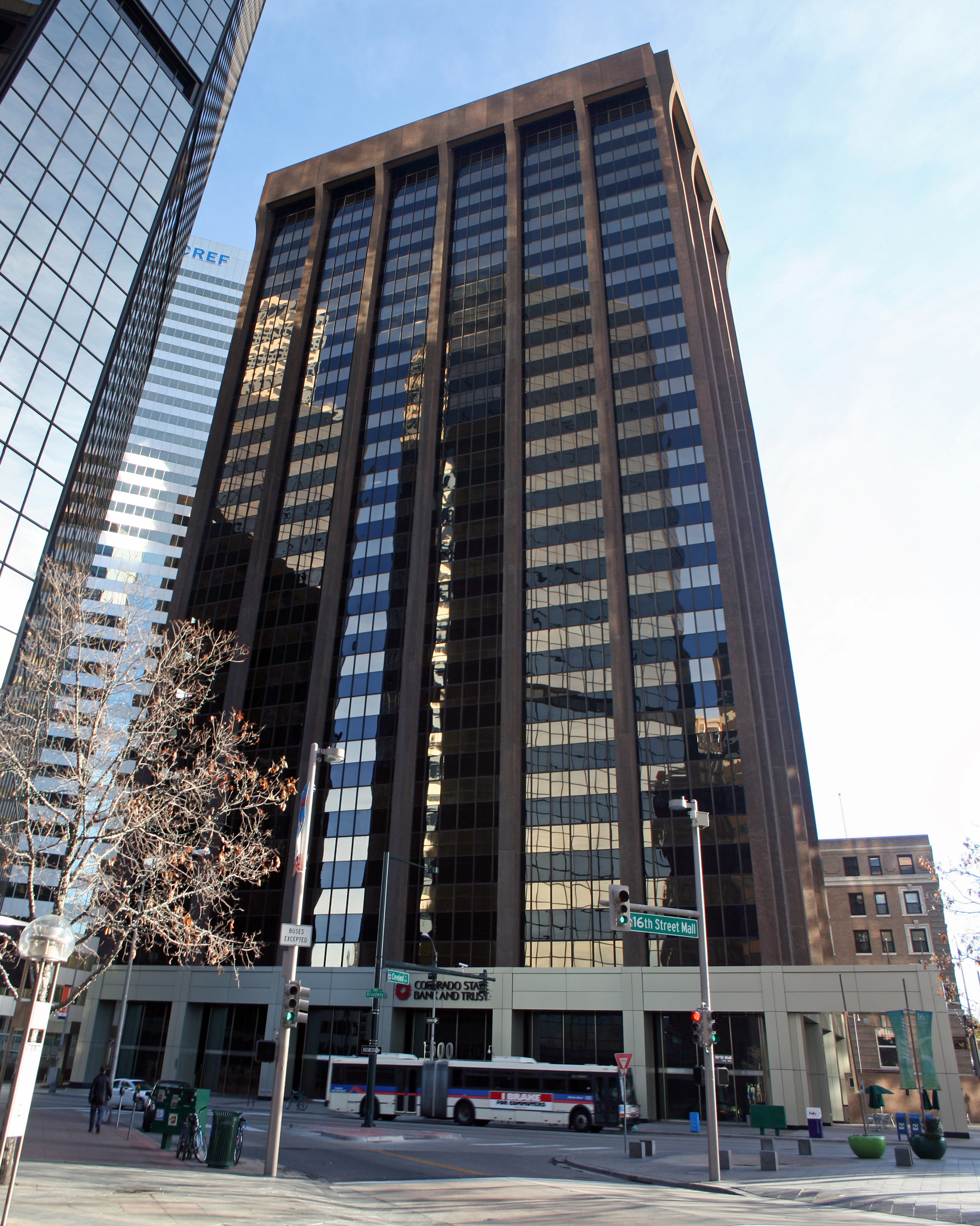
Building hosting the Economic and Cultural Office in Denver

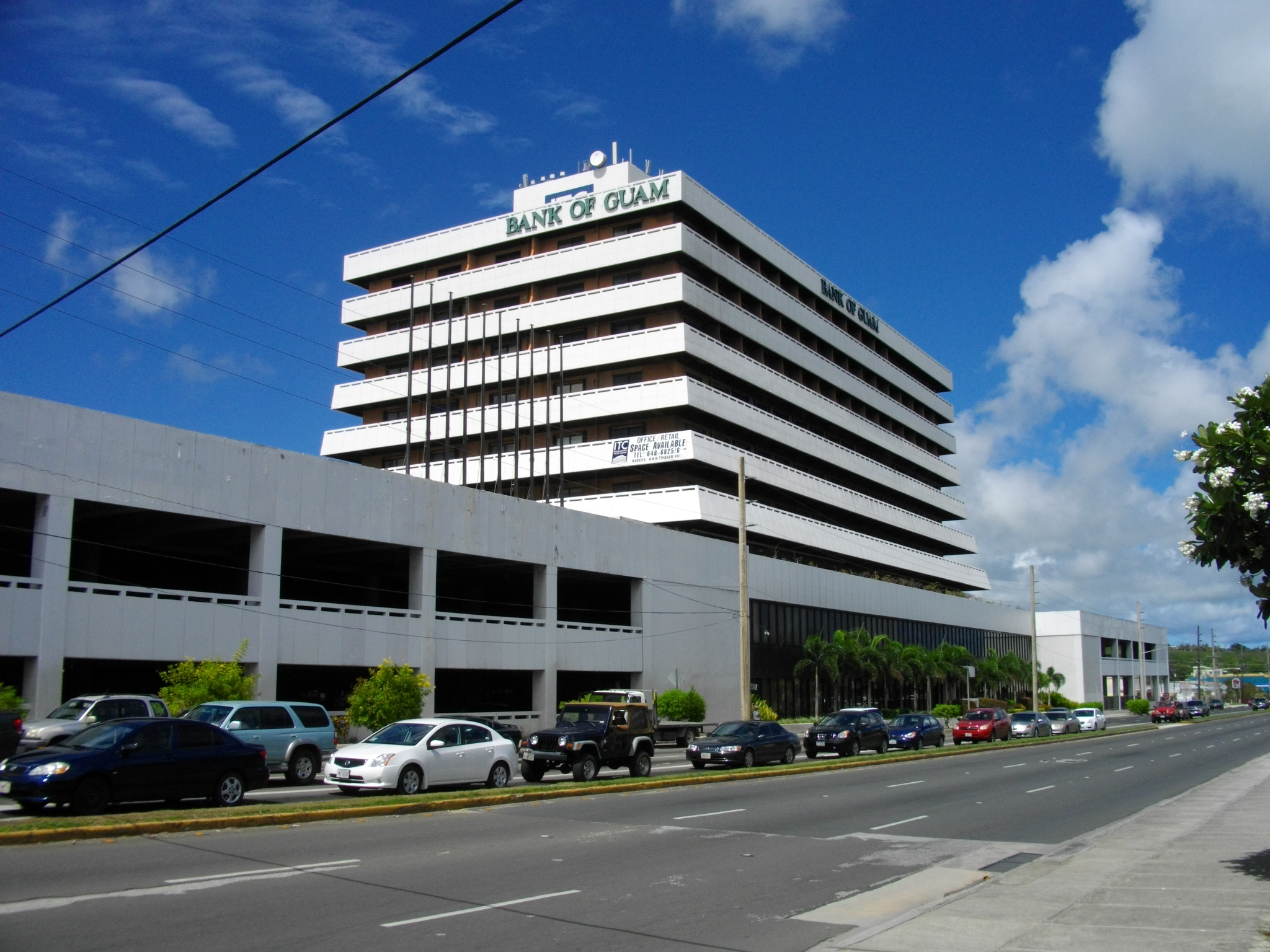
Building hosting the Economic and Cultural Office in Tamuning, Guam

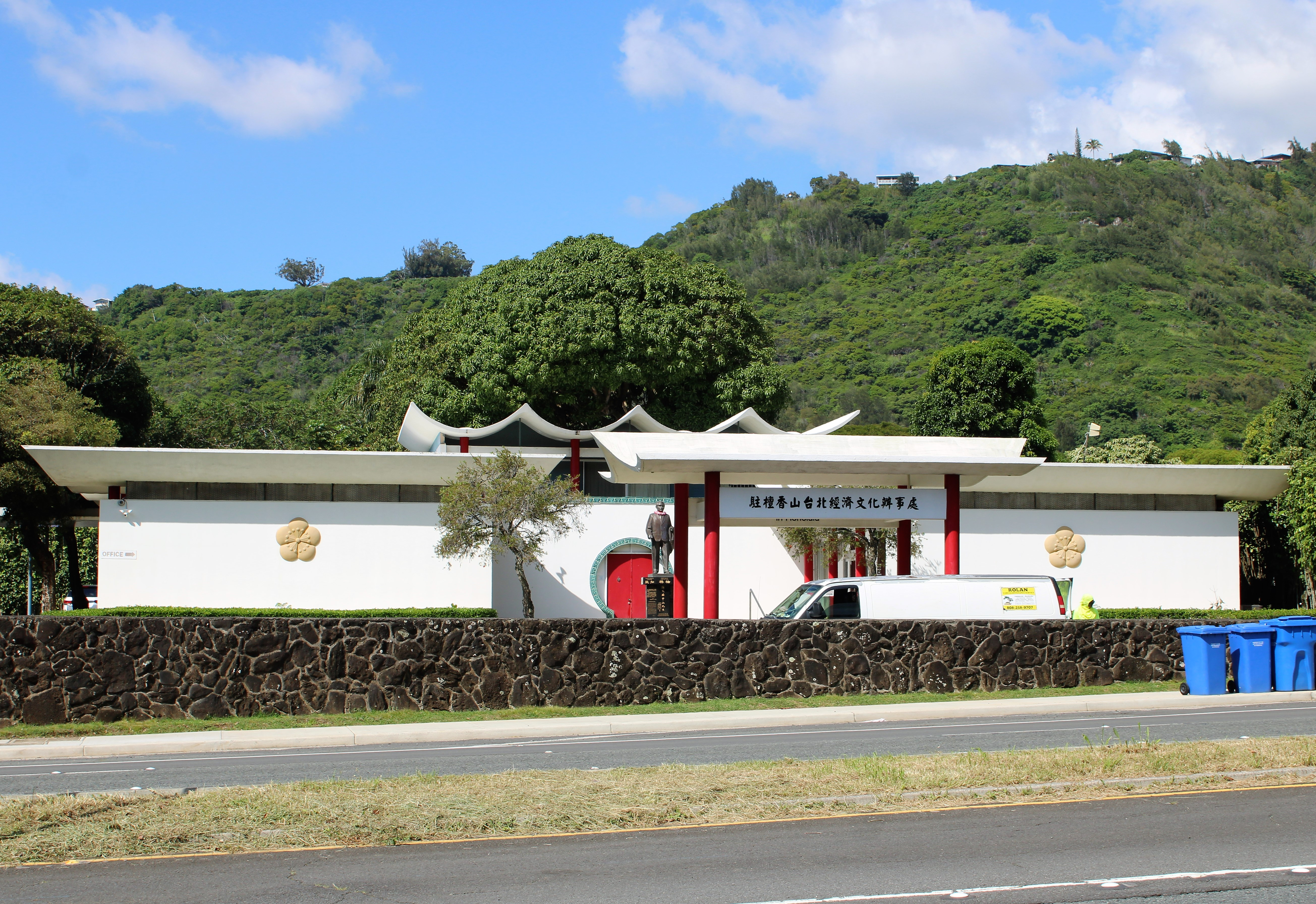
Economic and Cultural Office in Honolulu

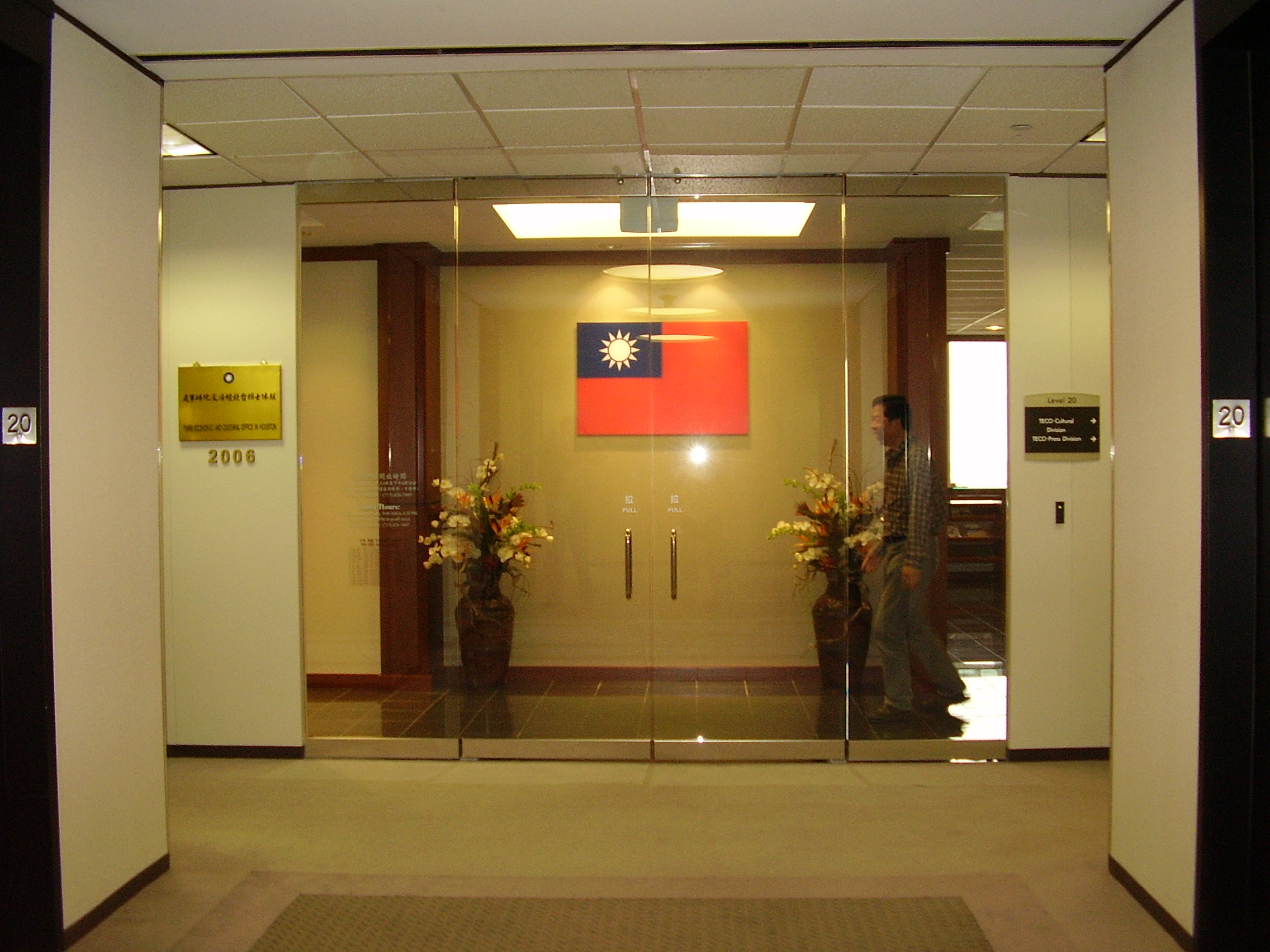
Economic and Cultural Office in Houston

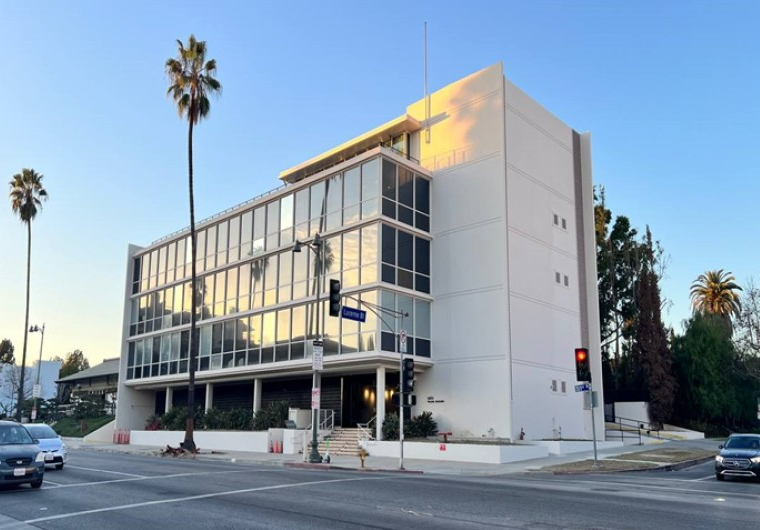
Economic and Cultural Office in Los Angeles

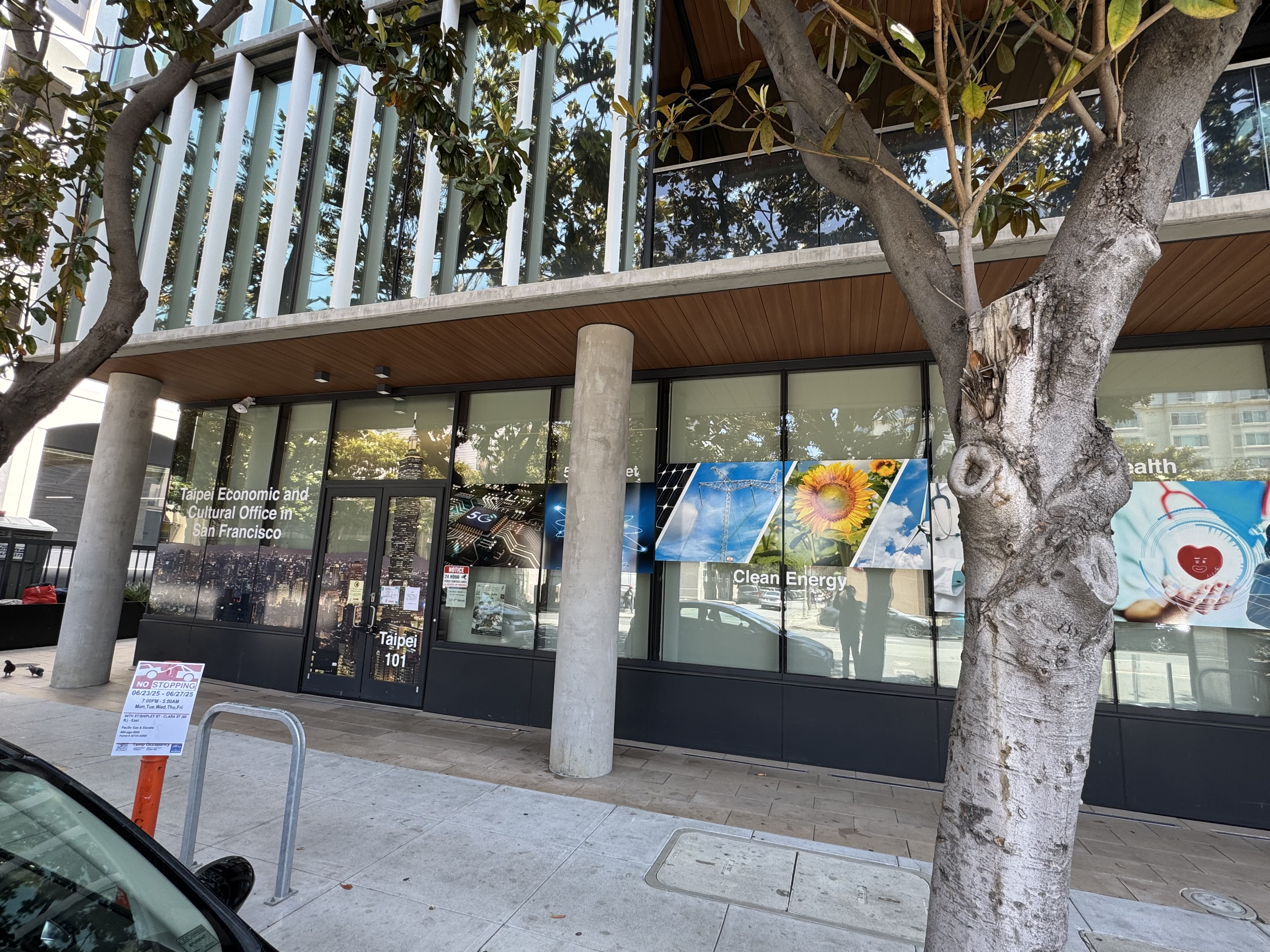
Economic and Cultural Office in San Francisco

=== Asia ===
Host country	Host city	Mission	Year Opened	Jurisdiction	Ref.
Bahrain	Manama	Trade Office	1977		
Brunei	Bandar Seri Begawan	Economic and Cultural Office	1978 (Note: Closed between 2006 and 2007)		
China	Hong Kong	Economic and Cultural Office	1990	Countries: Pakistan (Note: Pakistan is served by both the representative offices in Hong Kong and Saudi Arabia.)	
China	Macau	Economic and Cultural Office	1999		
India	New Delhi	Economic and Cultural Center	1995	Countries: Bangladesh (Note: Bangladesh is served by both the representative offices in India and Thailand.); Bhutan; Nepal	
India	Chennai	Economic and Cultural Center	2012	Countries: Maldives; Sri Lanka	
India	Mumbai	Economic and Cultural Center	2024		
Indonesia	Jakarta	Economic and Trade Office	1971	Countries: Timor-Leste	
Indonesia	Surabaya	Economic and Trade Office	2015		
Israel	Tel Aviv	Economic and Cultural Office	1993	Countries: Palestine	
Japan	Tokyo	Economic and Cultural Representative Office	1972		
Japan	Fukuoka	Branch Office	1972		
Japan	Naha	Branch Office	1958 (Note: Operated by a separate organization until 2006 due to the Senkaku Islands dispute)		
Japan	Osaka	Economic and Cultural Office	1972		
Japan	Sapporo	Branch Office	2009		
Japan	Yokohama	Branch Office	1972		
Jordan	Amman	Economic and Cultural Office	1977	Countries: Egypt; Iraq; Lebanon; Libya (Note: Libya is served by both the representative offices in France and Jordan.); Syria	
Kuwait	Kuwait City	Commercial Representative Office	1986	Countries: Qatar (Note: Qatar is served by both the representative offices in Kuwait and Saudi Arabia.)	
Malaysia	Kuala Lumpur	Economic and Cultural Office	1974		
Mongolia	Ulaanbaatar	Trade and Economic Representative Office	2002		
Myanmar	Yangon	Economic and Cultural Office	2016		
Oman	Muscat	Economic and Cultural Office	1977		
Philippines	Manila	Economic and Cultural Office	1975		
Saudi Arabia	Riyadh	Economic and Cultural Representative Office	1990	Countries: Afghanistan; Djibouti; Ethiopia; Pakistan; Qatar; South Sudan; Sudan; Yemen	
Singapore	Singapore	Representative Office	1969	Countries: North Korea	
South Korea	Seoul	Mission	1993		
South Korea	Busan	Office	2004		
Thailand	Bangkok	Economic and Cultural Office	1980	Countries: Bangladesh	
Turkey	Ankara	Economic and Cultural Mission	1989	Countries: Georgia (Note: Served by both the representative offices in Russia and Turkey.); Kazakhstan; Kyrgyzstan; Northern Cyprus; Tajikistan; Turkmenistan; Uzbekistan	
United Arab Emirates	Dubai	Commercial Office	1979	Countries: Eritrea; Iran; Somalia	
Vietnam	Hanoi	Economic and Cultural Office	1992	Countries: Laos	
Vietnam	Ho Chi Minh City	Economic and Cultural Office	1992	Countries: Cambodia	

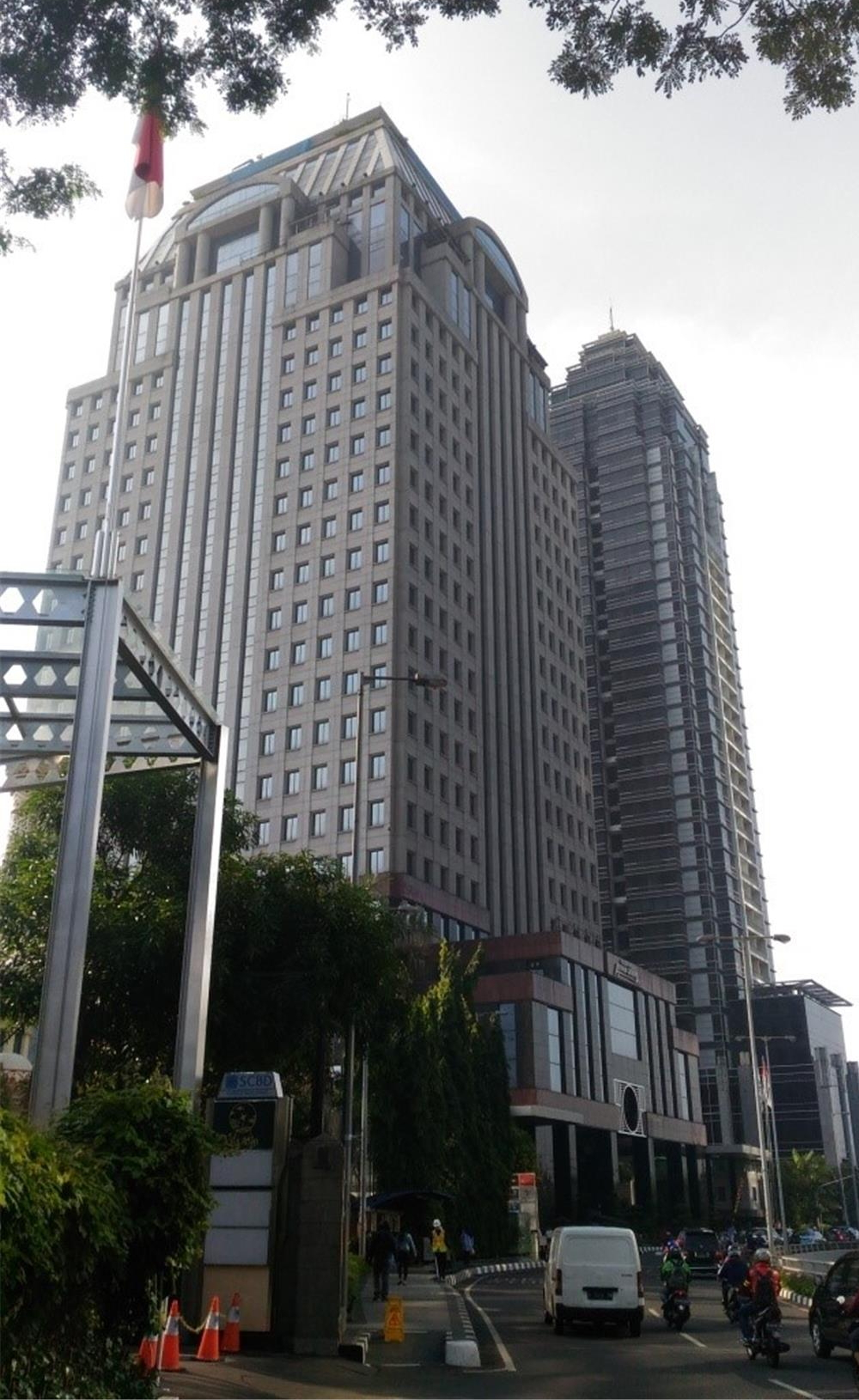
Building hosting the Economic and Trade Office in Jakarta

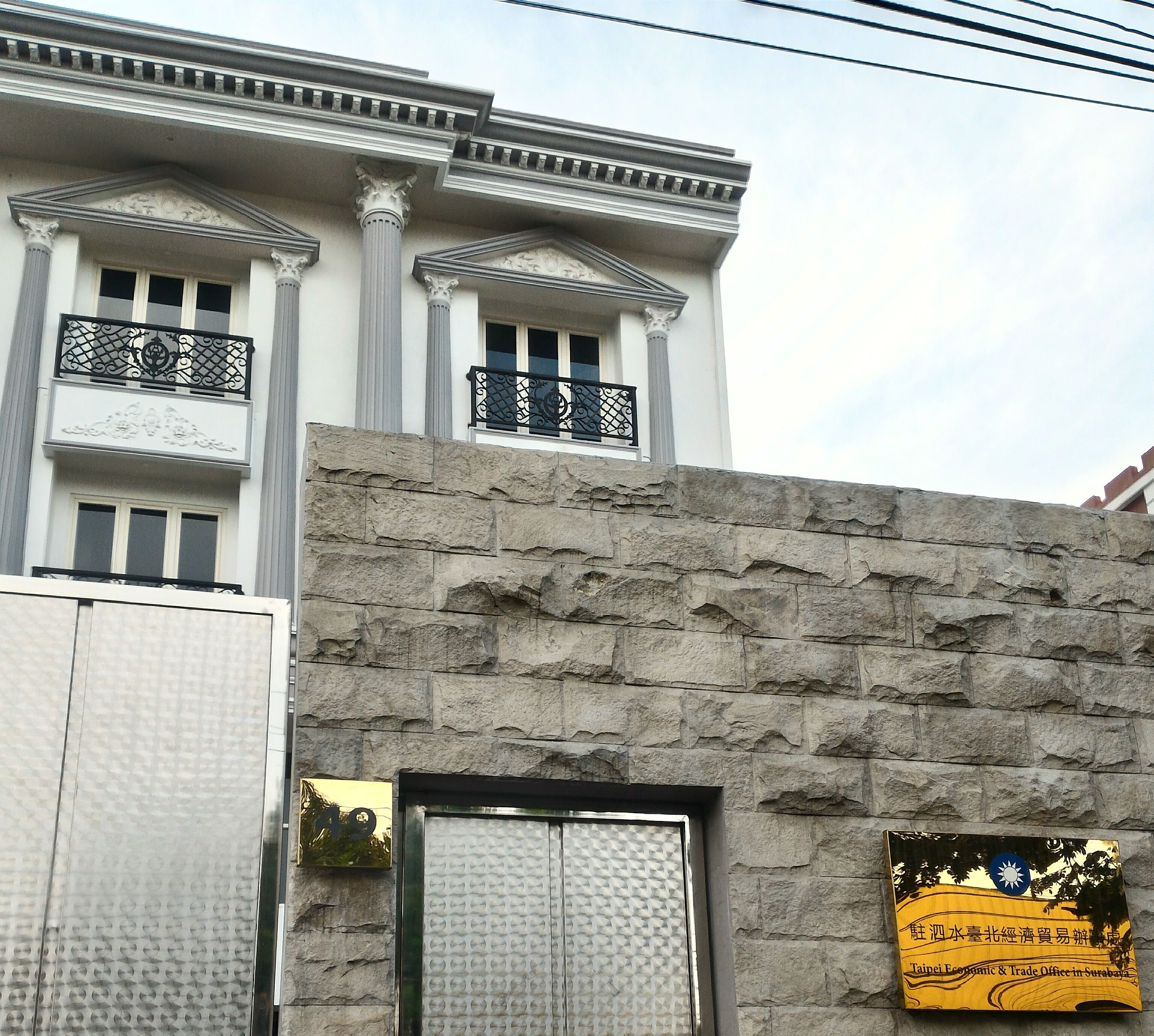
Economic and Trade Office in Surabaya

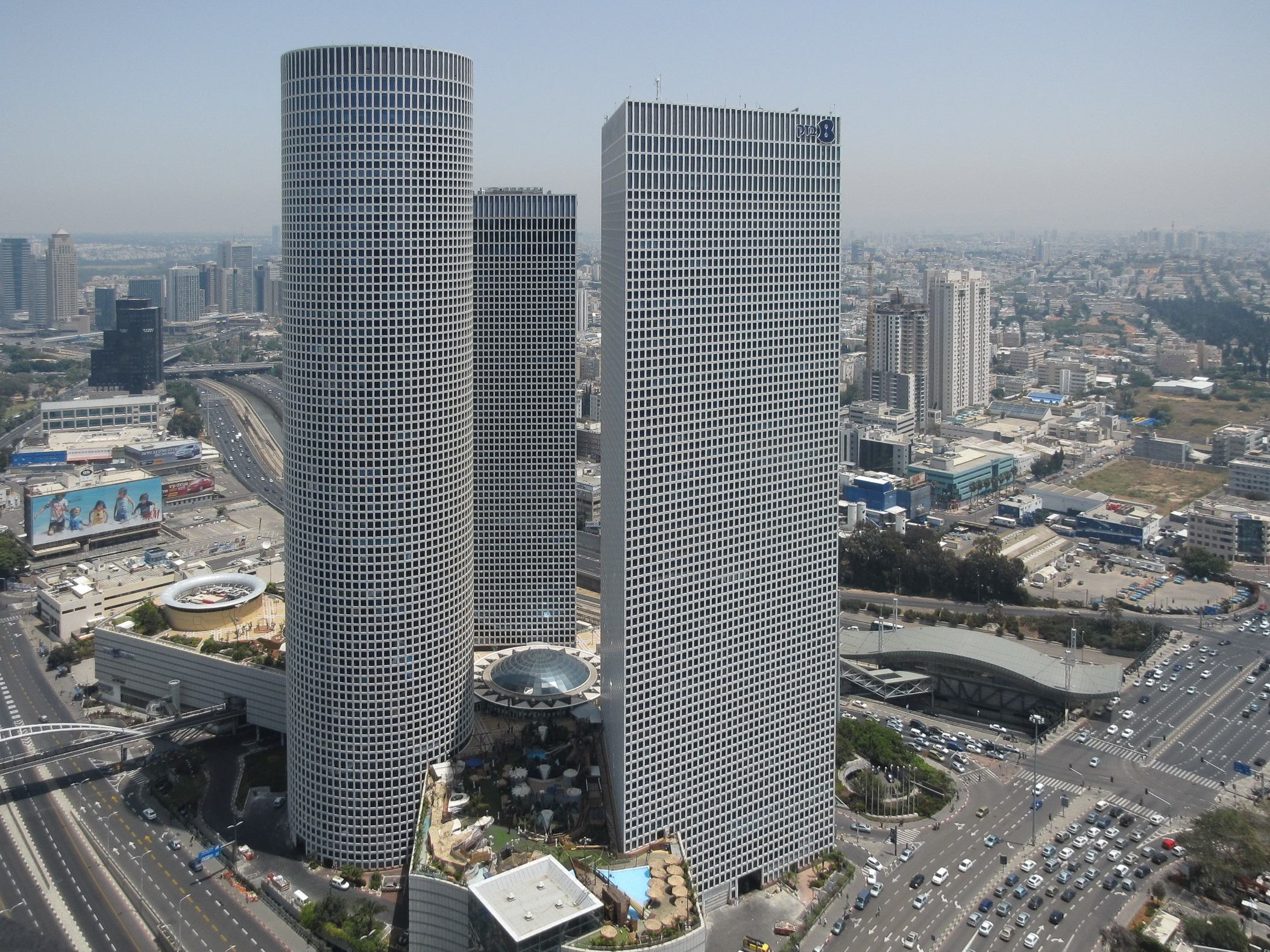
Building hosting the Economic and Cultural Office in Tel Aviv

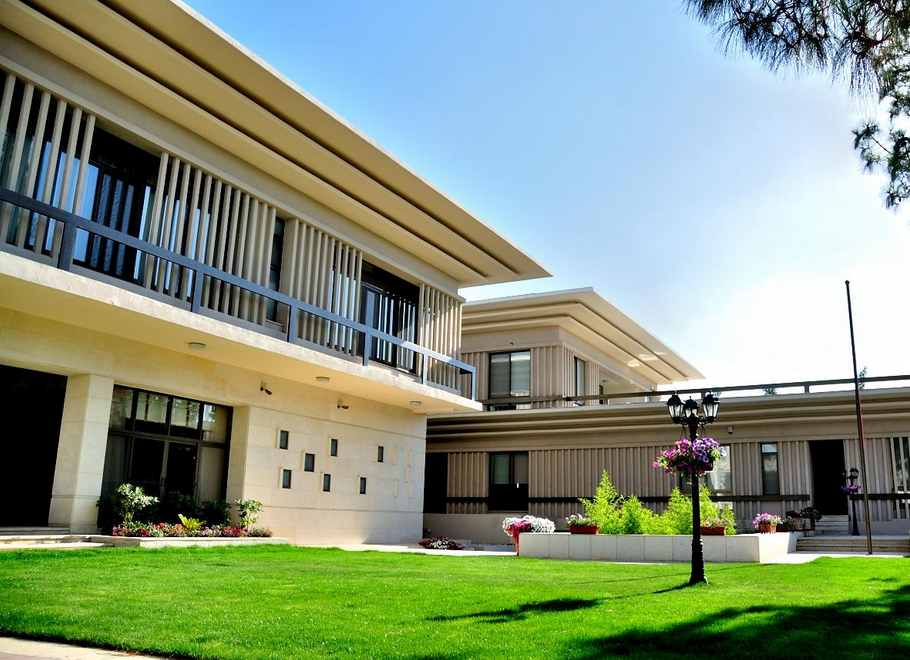
Economic and Cultural Office in Amman

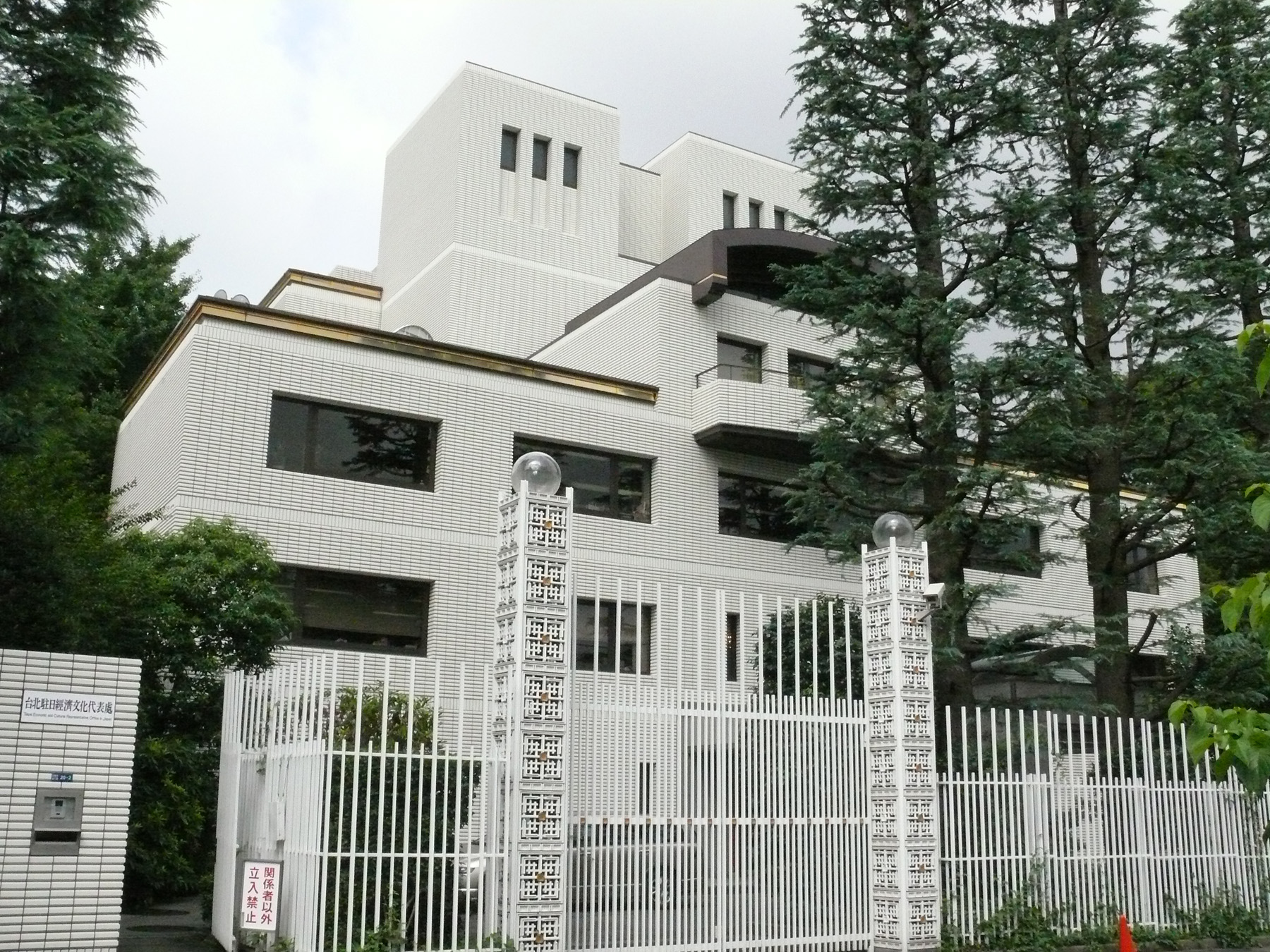
Economic and Cultural Representative Office in Tokyo

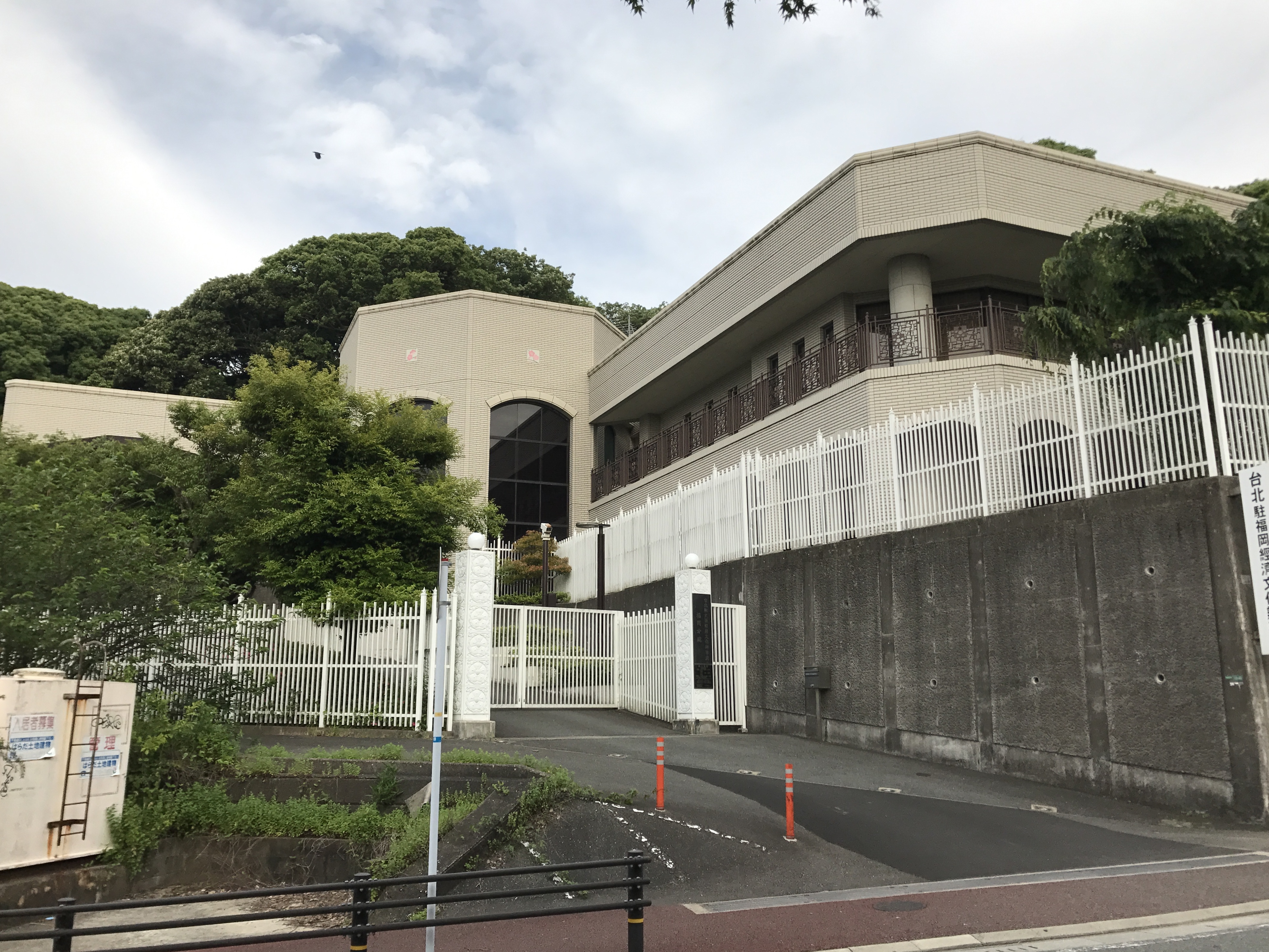
Economic and Cultural Office in Fukuoka

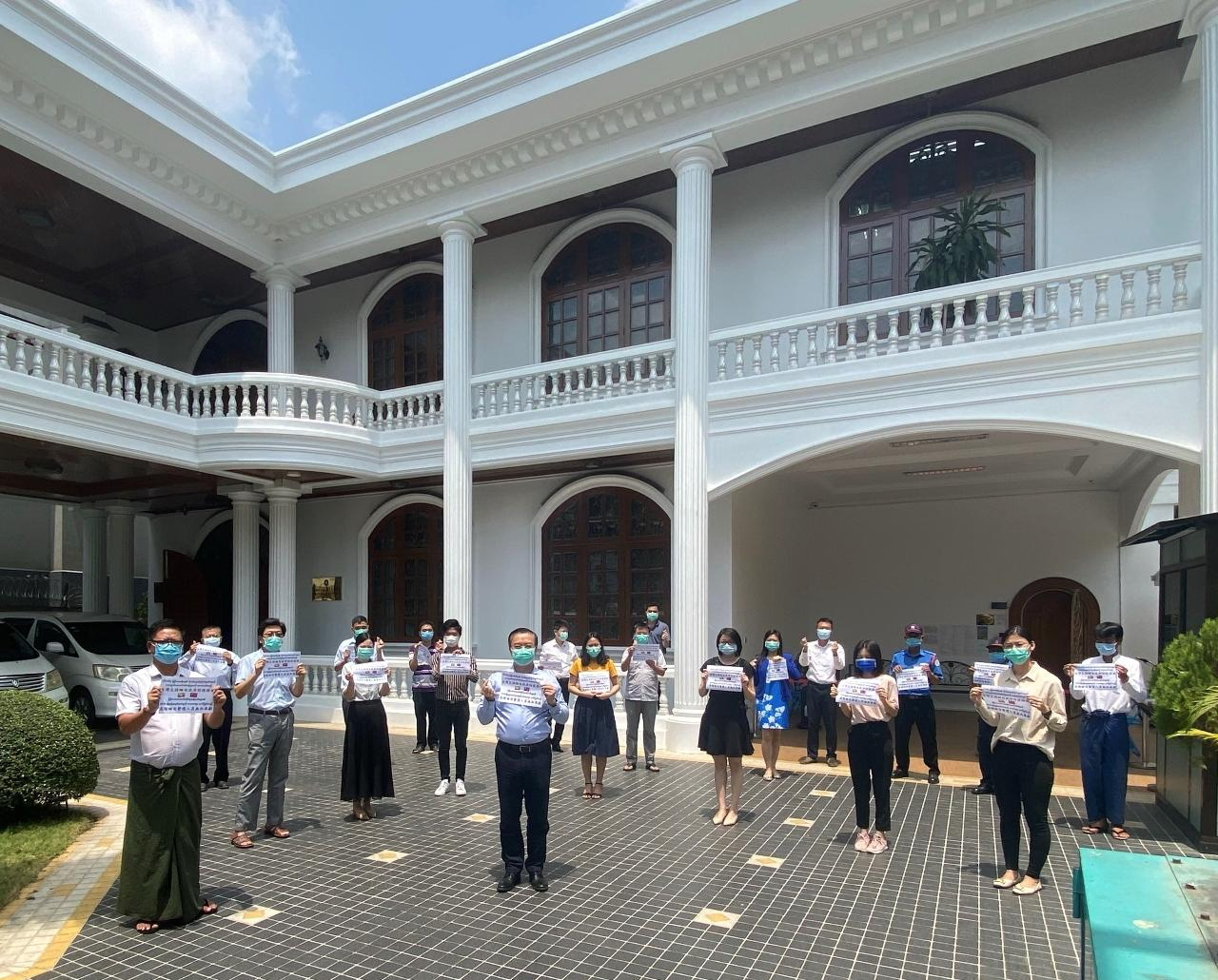
Economic and Cultural Office in Yangon

Building hosting the Economic and Cultural Office in Manila

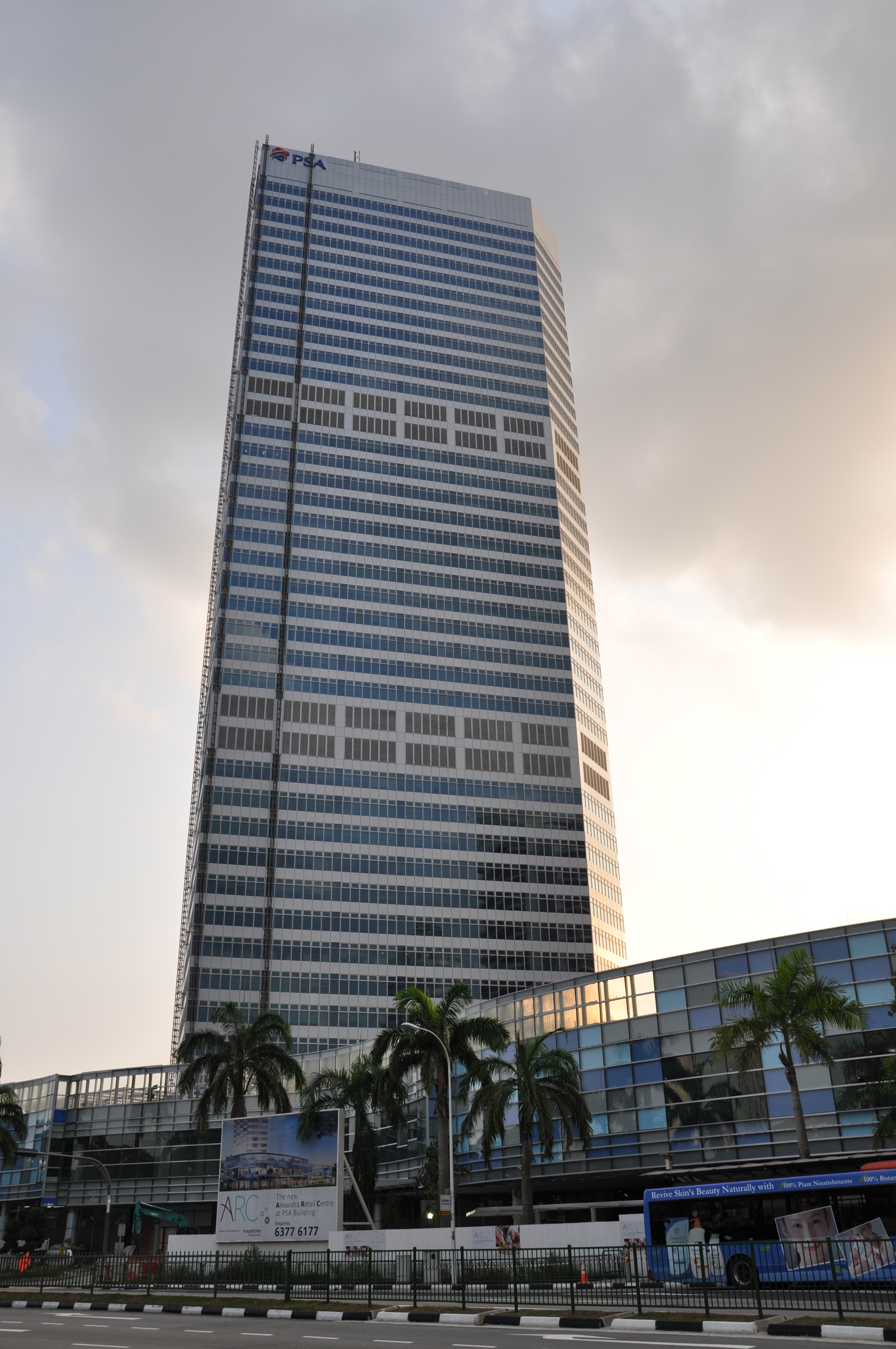
Building hosting the Representative Office in Singapore

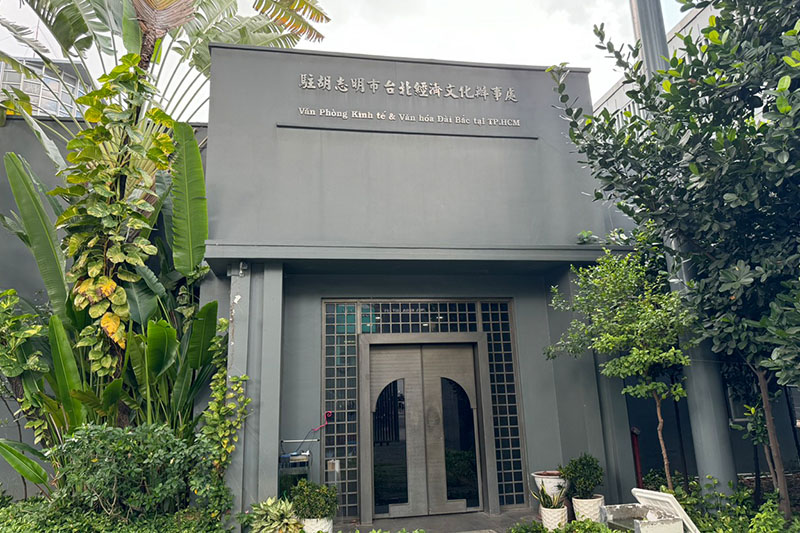
Economic and Cultural Office in Ho Chi Minh City

=== Europe ===
Host country	Host city	Mission	Year Opened	Jurisdiction	Ref.
Austria	Vienna	Economic and Culture Office	1972	Countries: Croatia; Slovenia	
Belgium	Brussels	Representative Office	1976	Countries: Burundi; Cameroon; Democratic Republic of the Congo; Gabon (Note: Gabon is served by both the representative office in Belgium and the representative offices in Paris and Aix-en-Provence, France.); Luxembourg; Rwanda; International Organizations: European Union (Note: Although the office in Brussels was opened in 1976, it initially served only Belgium and did not start serving the European Union as an organization until 2001.)	
Czech Republic	Prague	Economic and Cultural Office	1991		
Denmark	Copenhagen	Representative Office	1980	Countries: Iceland; Territories: Faroe Islands; Greenland	
Finland	Helsinki	Representative Office	1990		
France	Paris	Representative Office	1972	Countries: Algeria (Note: Served by the representative offices in Paris and Aix-en-Provence, France.); Andorra; Benin; Burkina Faso; Burundi; Cameroon; Central African Republic; Chad; Comoros; Republic of the Congo; Gabon; Guinea; Libya; Mali; Mauritania; Monaco; Morocco; Niger; Rwanda; Senegal; Togo; Tunisia; Western Sahara; Territories: French Guiana; Mayotte; Réunion	
France	Aix-en-Provence	Office	2020	Countries: Algeria; Andorra; Benin; Chad; Republic of the Congo; Gabon; Mauritania; Monaco; Morocco; Senegal; Togo; Tunisia	
Germany	Berlin	Representative Office	1981		
Germany	Frankfurt	Office	1999		
Germany	Hamburg	Office	1964		
Germany	Munich	Office	1999		
Greece	Athens	Representative Office	1973	Countries: Bulgaria; Cyprus	
Hungary	Budapest	Representative Office	1990	Countries: Bosnia and Herzegovina; Kosovo; Montenegro; Romania (Note: Romania is served by both the representative offices in Hungary and Slovakia.); Serbia	
Ireland	Dublin	Representative Office	1988		
Italy	Rome	Representative Office	1990	Countries: Albania; Malta; North Macedonia; San Marino	
Italy	Milan	Office	2023		
Latvia	Riga	Mission	1997	Countries: Estonia	
Lithuania	Vilnius	Representative Office	2021		
Netherlands	The Hague	Representative Office	1979	Territories: Curaçao; Bonaire; Aruba	
Poland	Warsaw	Representative Office	1992	Countries: Ukraine (Note: Ukraine is served by both the representative offices in Poland and Russia.) after 25 February 2022	
Portugal	Lisbon	Economic and Cultural Center	1992	Countries: Cape Verde; Guinea-Bissau; São Tomé and Príncipe	
Russia	Moscow	Representative Office	1993	Countries: Armenia; Azerbaijan; Belarus; Georgia; Kazakhstan; Kyrgyzstan; Moldova; Tajikistan; Turkmenistan; Ukraine; Uzbekistan	
Slovakia	Bratislava	Representative Office	2003	Countries: Romania	
Spain	Madrid	Economic and Cultural Office	1973	Countries: Equatorial Guinea	
Sweden	Stockholm	Mission	1981	Countries: Norway	
Switzerland	Bern (Note: Moved from Lausanne office)	Cultural and Economic Delegation	1994	Countries: Liechtenstein	
Switzerland	Geneva	Office	1997		
United Kingdom	London	Representative Office	1963	Countries: Ghana; Seychelles; Sierra Leone; Territories: British Virgin Islands; Cayman Islands; Falkland Islands; Guernsey; Jersey; Turks and Caicos Islands	
United Kingdom	Edinburgh	Office	1998	Territories: Isle of Man	

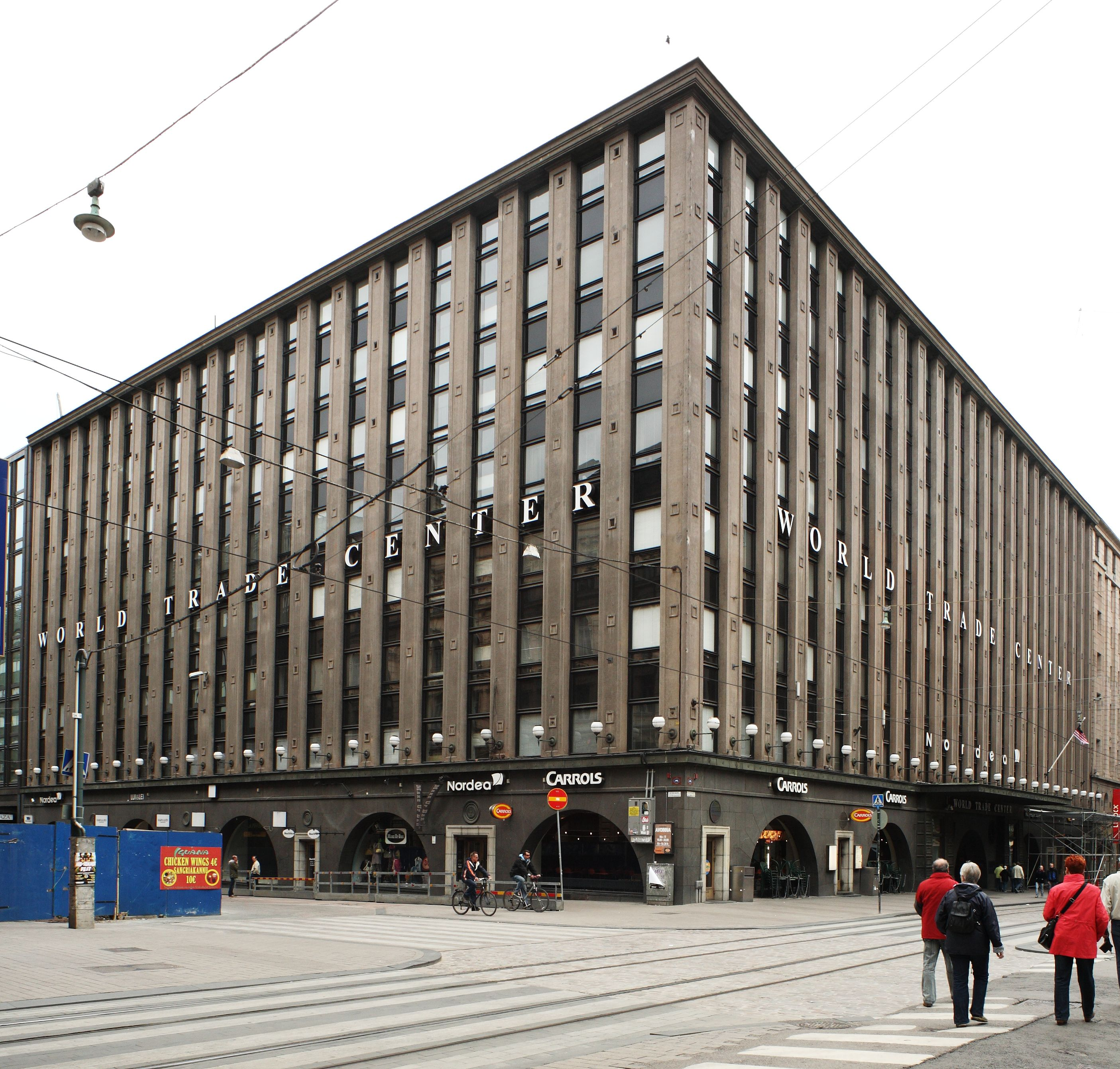
Building hosting the Representative Office in Helsinki

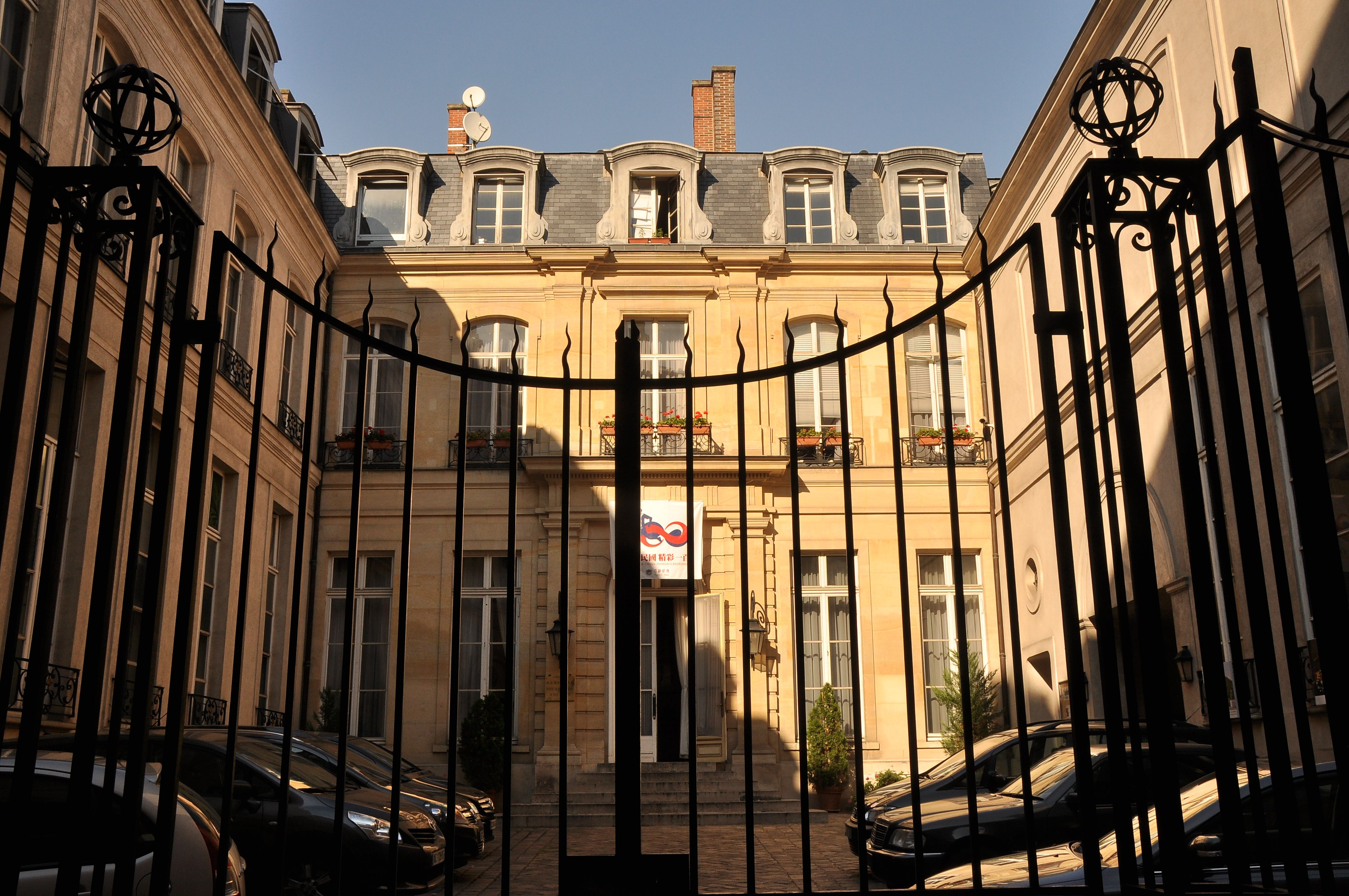
Representative Office in Paris

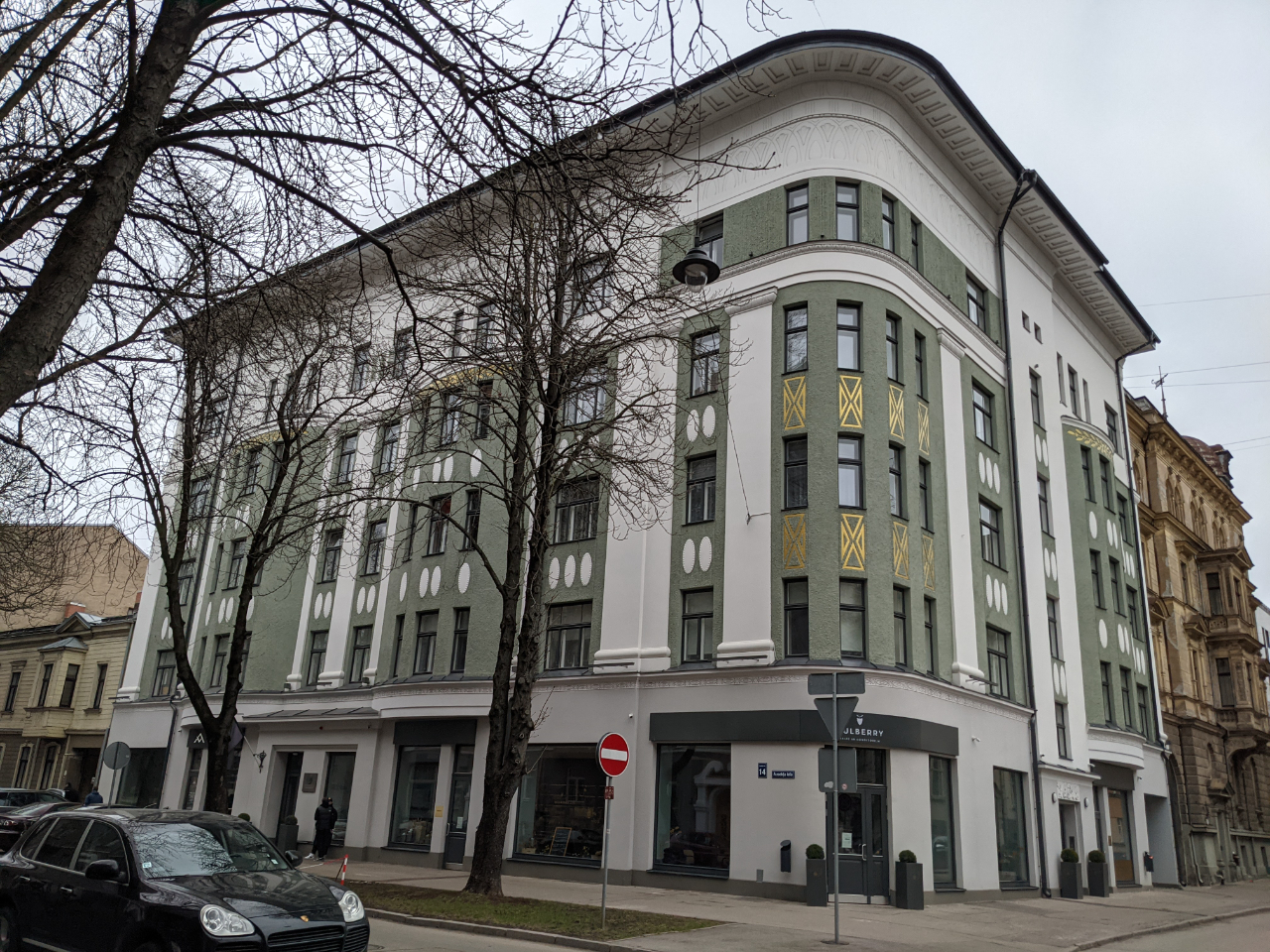
Mission in Riga

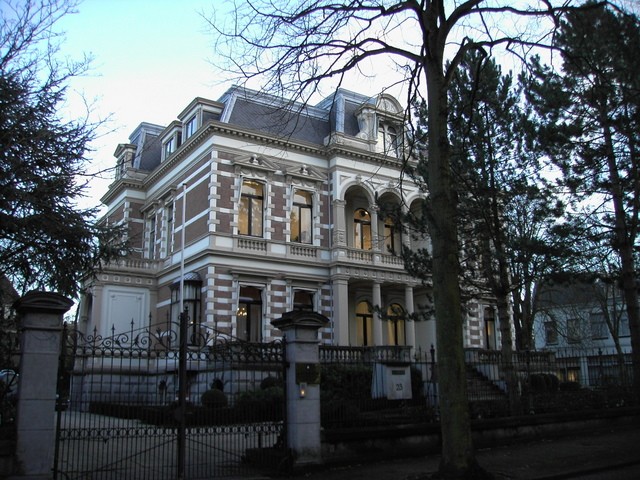
Representative Office in The Hague

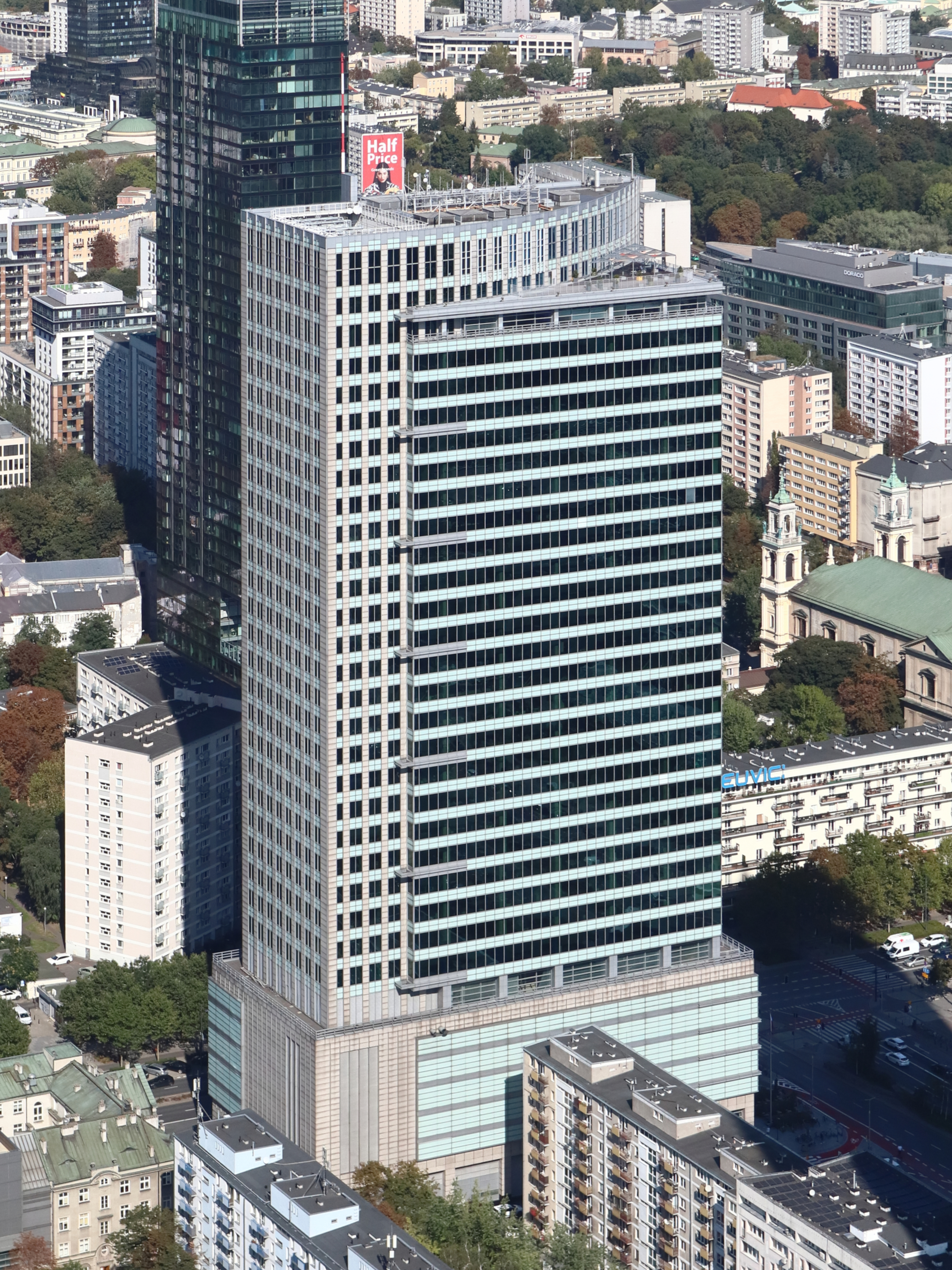
Building hosting the Representative Office in Warsaw

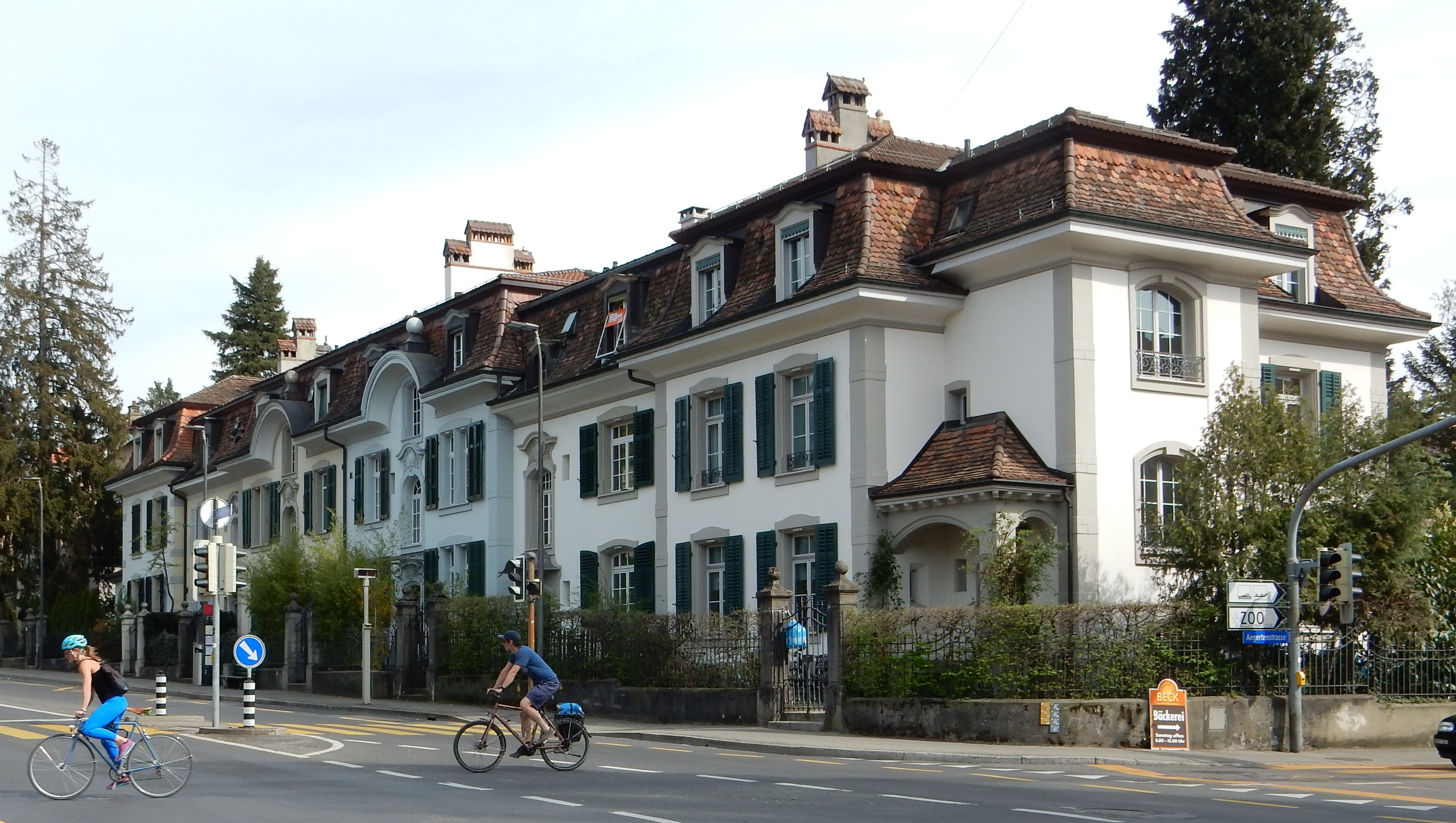
Delegation in Bern

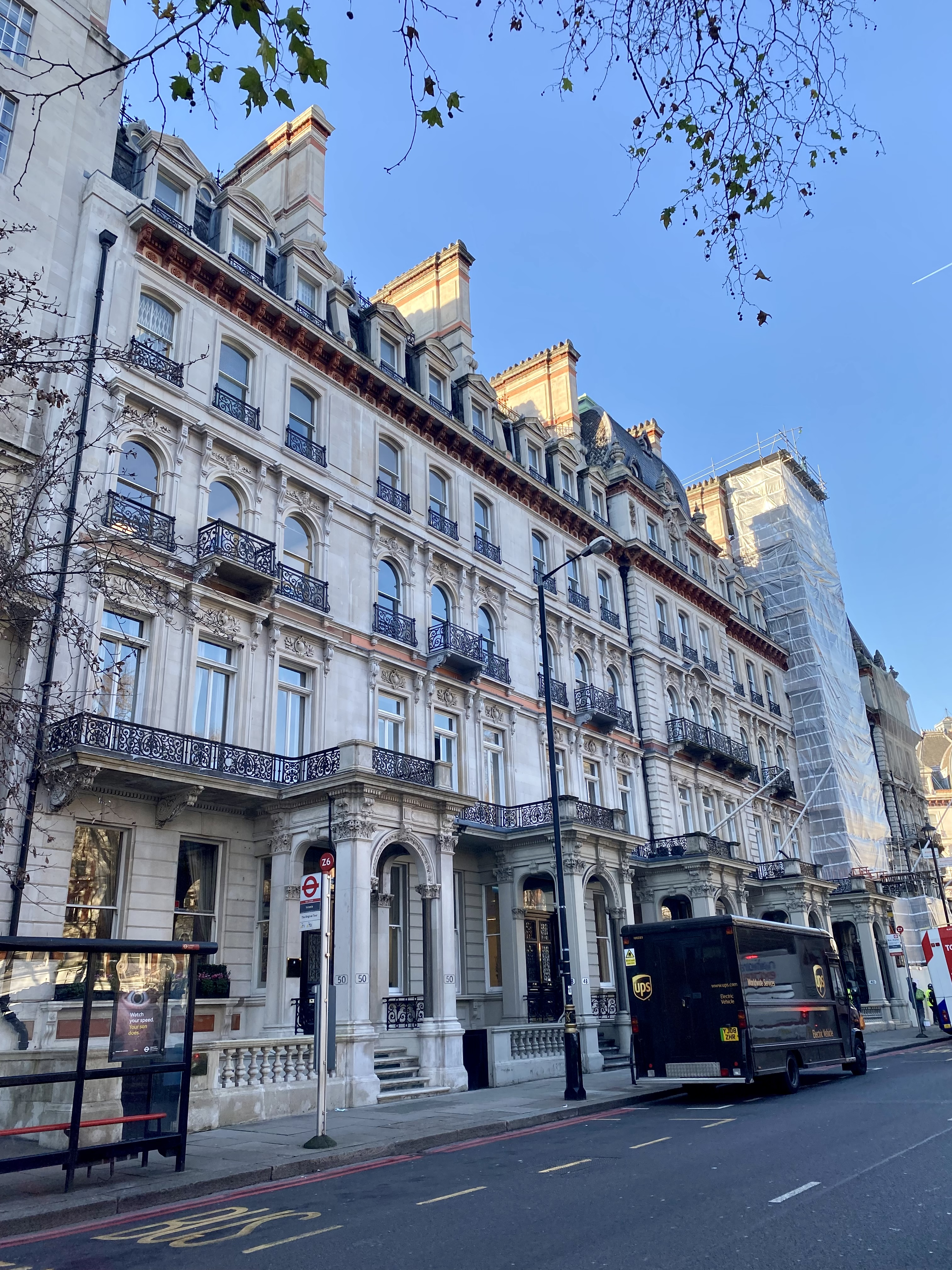
Representative Office in London

=== Oceania ===
Host country	Host city	Mission	Year Opened	Jurisdiction	Ref.
Australia	Canberra	Economic and Cultural Office	1988		
Australia	Brisbane	Economic and Cultural Office	2005		
Australia	Melbourne	Economic and Cultural Office	1979		
Australia	Sydney	Economic and Cultural Office	1979		
Fiji	Suva	Trade Office	1971	Countries: Kiribati; Samoa; Tonga; Vanuatu; Territories: French Polynesia; New Caledonia; Wallis and Futuna	
New Zealand	Wellington	Economic and Cultural Office	1991	Countries: Cook Islands; Niue	
New Zealand	Auckland	Economic and Cultural Office	1973	Territories: French Polynesia (Note: French Polynesia is served by both the representative offices in Fiji and New Zealand.)	

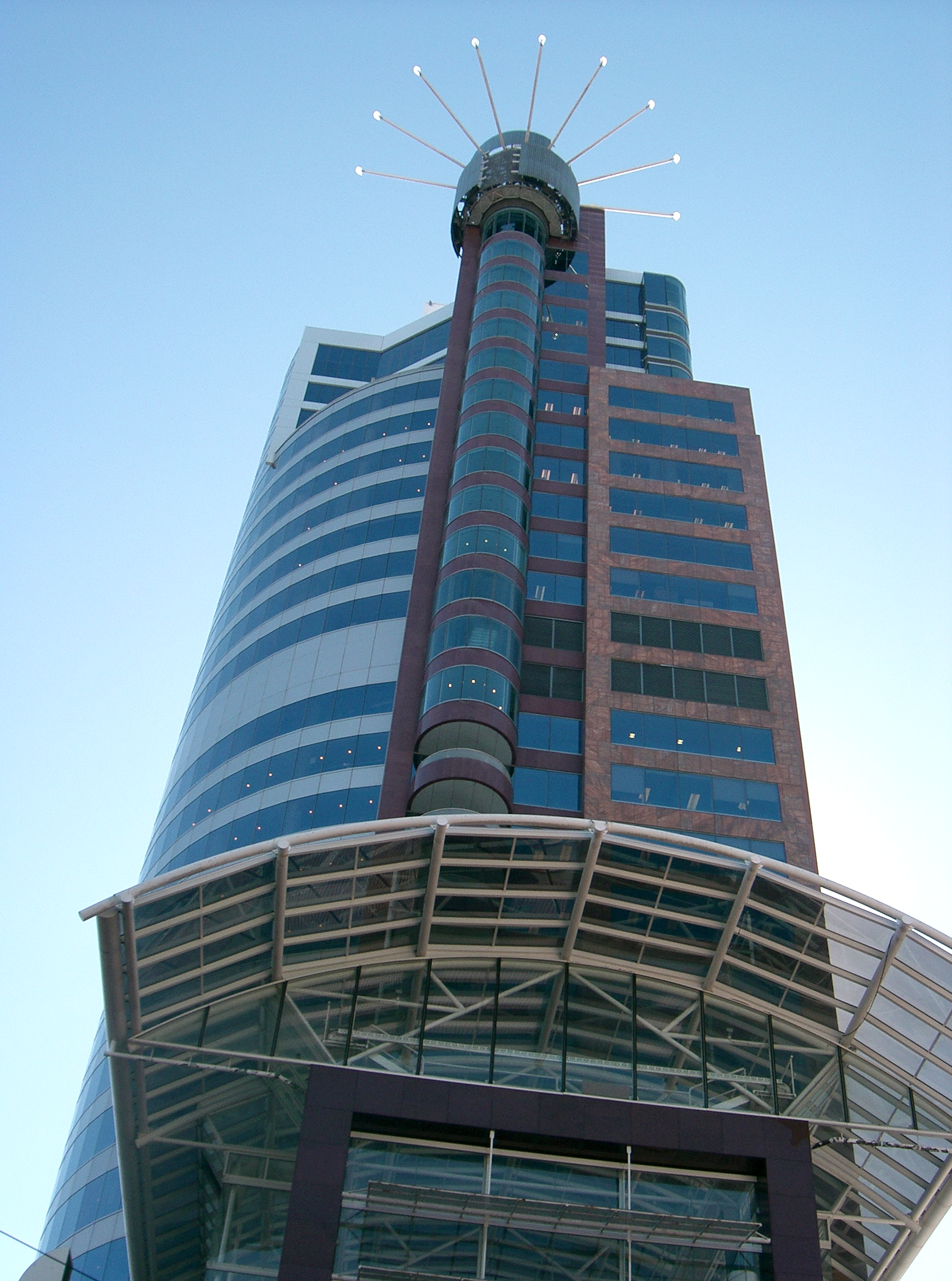
Building hosting the Economic and Cultural Office in Wellington

=== Multilateral organizations ===
Organization	Host City	Host country	Mission	Year Opened	Jurisdiction	Ref.
European Union	Brussels	Belgium	Representative Office	2001	Countries: Belgium; Burundi; Cameroon; Democratic Republic of the Congo; Gabon; Luxembourg; Rwanda	
World Trade Organization	Geneva	Switzerland	Permanent Mission	2002		

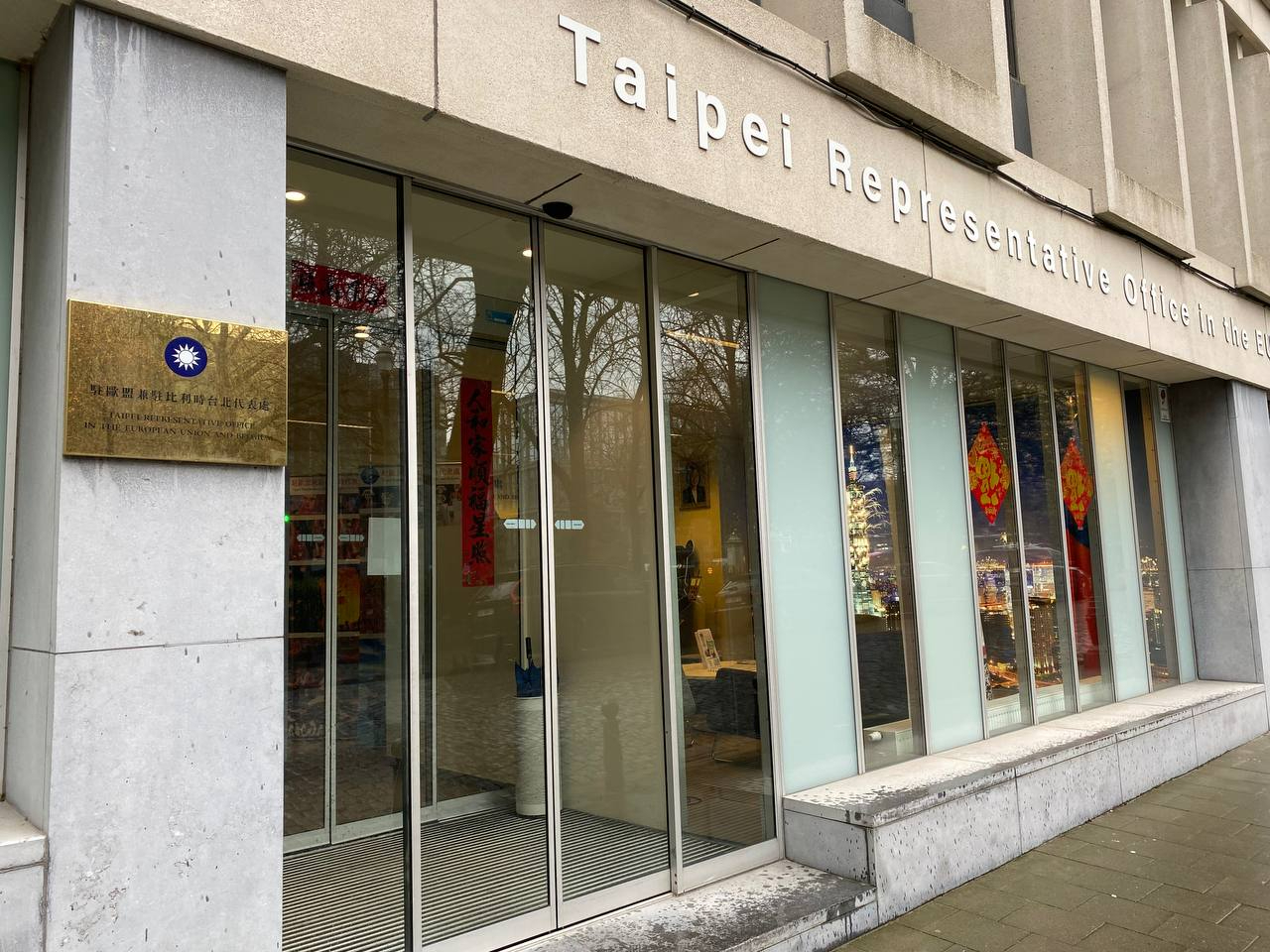
Representative Office to the European Union

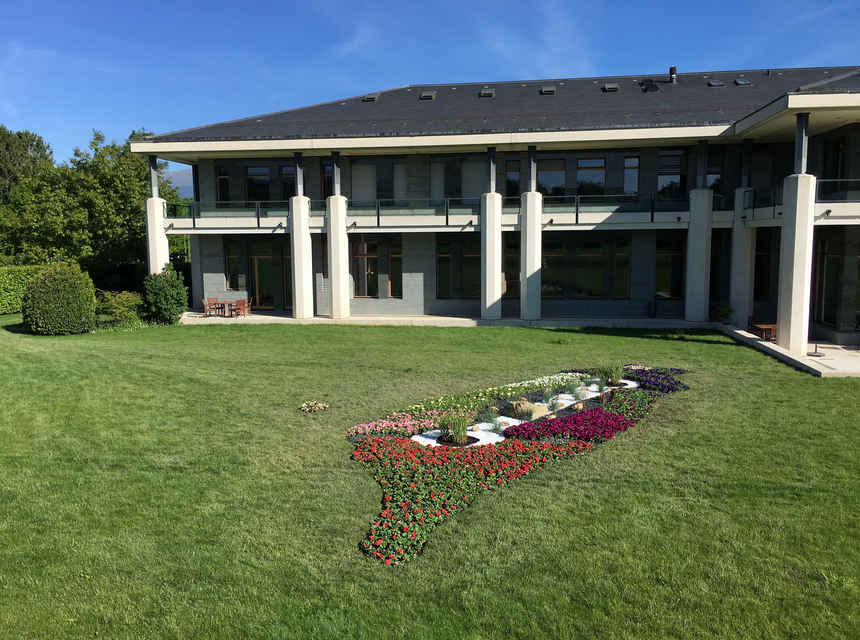
Permanent Mission to the World Trade Organization

== Closed missions ==
Key
*	Mission closed due to withdrawal of official diplomatic recognition
**	Same as above, but an unofficial office was set up to succeed it that is still in operation

List of defunct diplomatic missions as of 2021
Country	Region	City	Mission	Opened	Closed	Notes	Ref(s)
Bangladesh	Asia	Dhaka	Embassy (de facto) (Note: Resident in Bangkok, Thailand)	2004	2009	Reassigned to representative office in India	
Belarus	Europe	Minsk	Embassy (de facto) (Note: Resident in Moscow, Russia)	1996	2006	Reassigned to representative office in Russia	
Benin	Africa	Cotonou	Embassy* (Note: Served by both the representative office in Nigeria and representative offices in Paris and Aix-en-Provence, France.)		1965		
Bolivia	Americas	La Paz	Embassy (de facto) (Note: Resident in Lima, Peru)	1990	2009		
Botswana	Africa	Gaborone	Embassy* (Note: Resident in Pretoria, Gauteng, China)		1974		
Burkina Faso	Africa	Ouagadougou	Embassy* (Note: Burkina Faso is served by both the representative offices in France and Nigeria.)		2018		
Khmer Republic	Asia	Phnom Penh	"Military mission"	1972	1975		
Cambodia	Asia	Phnom Penh	Embassy (de facto) (Note: Resident in Ho Chi Minh City, Vietnam)	1994	1997		
Central African Republic	Africa	Bangui	Embassy* (Note: Resident in Paris, Ile-de-France, France)		1964		
Colombia	Americas	Bogotá	Embassy** (Note: Continues as a Commercial Office nowadays.)	1947	1980	Initially legation, promoted to embassy in 1961	
Colombia	Americas	Barranquilla	Consulate-general*	1972	1980	Initially consulate, promoted to consulate-general in 1979	
Colombia	Americas	Barranquilla	Consulate (de facto)	1980	1991		
Costa Rica	Americas	San José	Embassy*		2007		
Dominica	Americas	Roseau	Embassy* (Note: Resident in Washington, D.C., United States)		2004		
Dominican Republic	Americas	Santo Domingo	Embassy* (Note: Dominican Republic is served by both the Embassy in Guatemala and the representative office in Miami, United States.)		2018		
Ecuador	Americas	Guayaquil	Consulate (de facto)	1974	1998		
El Salvador	Americas	San Salvador	Embassy* (Note: Resident in Guatemala City, Guatemala)		2018		
Gabon	Africa	Libreville	Embassy* (Note: Gabon is served by both the representative office in Belgium and the representative offices in Paris and Aix-en-Provence, France.)		1974		
Gambia	Africa	Banjul	Embassy* (Note: Resident in Lagos, Nigeria)		1974		
Gambia	Africa	Banjul	Embassy*	1996	2013		
Greece	Europe	Athens	Embassy** (Note: Now continues as a Taipei Representative Office in Greece.)	1929	1972	Started as legation, promoted to embassy in 1947	
Honduras	Americas	Tegucigalpa	Embassy*	1957	2023	Started as legation, promoted to consulate in 1962, then embassy in 1965	
Honduras	Americas	San Pedro Sula	Consulate-general*	1997	2023		
Empire of Japan	Asia	Taihoku	Consulate-General (Note: In 1930, the Nationalist government opened the consulate-general in Taihoku (Taipei), when Taiwan was under Japanese rule until it was closed in 1945 after the end of the war. It was succeeded by an unofficial representative office that is still operating.)	1930	1945		
Japan	Asia	Nagasaki	Consulate	1912	1970	Japan broke off diplomatic relations with Taiwan in 1972, when two years after the closure of the consulate in Nagasaki.	
Kiribati	Oceania	Bairiki	Embassy* (Note: Resident in Canberra, Australian Capital Territory, Australia)	2004	2019		
Latvia	Europe	Riga	Consulate-general (Note: Although Latvia did not establish relations with Taiwan, it allowed the consulate to function as an official diplomatic office. It was succeeded by an unofficial representative office that is still operating.) (Note: Continues as a mission nowadays.)	1992	1994		
Liberia	Africa	Monrovia	Embassy*	1957	2003	Started as legation, promoted to embassy in 1960	
Libya	Africa	Tripoli	Embassy (de facto) (Note: Resident in Amman, Jordan)	1980	1997		
Libya	Africa	Tripoli	Embassy (de facto)	2008	2011	Closed due to the First Libyan Civil War	
Luxembourg	Europe	Luxembourg	Embassy (de facto) (Note: Resident in Brussels, Belgium)	1975	2002	Reassigned to representative mission in Belgium/EU	
North Macedonia	Europe	Skopje	Embassy* (Note: Although embassies were established by each country, relations only went up to ministerial level, and the Taiwanese embassy was staffed with a chargé d'affaires.) (Note: Resident in Rome, Lazio, Italy)	1999	2001		
Macau	Asia	Macau	Embassy (de facto) (Note: Continues as a Taipei Economic and Cultural Office in Macau.)	1945	1966	Special commissariat	
Madagascar	Africa	Antananarivo	Embassy*	1960	1972	Formerly a consulate-general before Madagascar's independence	
Malawi	Africa	Lilongwe	Embassy*		2008		
Nauru	Oceania	Aiwo	Embassy *	1980	2024	Originally consulate-general, promoted to embassy in 1990, closed due to breaking off of relations between 2002-2005 and since 2024.	
Nicaragua	Americas	Managua	Embassy *	1930	2021	Originally consulate-general, promoted to legation in 1955 and then embassy in 1965, closed due to breaking off of relations in 1985-1990 and since 2021.	
Niger	Africa	Niamey	Embassy*		1974		
Nigeria	Africa	Abuja	Embassy (de facto) (Note: Relocated to Lagos.)	2001	2018	Ultimately temporary relocation of Lagos office	
Norway	Europe	Oslo	Embassy (de facto) (Note: Resident in Stockholm, Sweden)	1980	2017	Reassigned to representative mission in Sweden	
Panama	Americas	Panama City	Embassy* (Note: Resident in Bogotá, Colombia)		2017		
Panama	Americas	Colón	Consulate-general		2009		
Rwanda	Africa	Kigali	Embassy* (Note: Served by the representative offices in Belgium, France and South Africa.)		1972		
Papua New Guinea	Asia	Port Moresby	Embassy (de facto)	1990	2026		
Peru	Americas	Lima	Embassy** (Note: Continues as a Taipei Economic and Cultural Office in Peru.)	1911	1971	Continuation of Qing embassy opened in 1875	
Saudi Arabia	Asia	Jeddah	Consulate (de facto)		2017	Reassigned to main office in Riyadh	
São Tomé and Príncipe	Africa	São Tomé	Embassy* (Note: Resident in Lisbon, Portugal)		2016		
Solomon Islands	Oceania	Honiara	Embassy*		2019		
South Africa	Africa	Pretoria	Embassy* (Note: Now continues as a Taipei Liaison Office in the Republic of South Africa.)	1976	1998	Succeeded by unofficial representative office	
South Africa	Africa	Johannesburg	Consulate*	1912	1998	Continuation of a Qing-era consulate, succeeded by unofficial representative office	
South Africa	Africa	Johannesburg	Consulate (de facto)	1998	2009		
South Africa	Africa	Cape Town	Consulate (Note: Continues as a Taipei Liaison Office in Cape Town nowadays.)**	1973	1998		
Senegal	Africa	Dakar	Embassy* (Note: Served by the representative offices in Paris and Aix-en-Provence, France.)		1964		
Switzerland	Europe	Zürich	Embassy (de facto)	1973	2007	Merged with Bern office	
Switzerland	Europe	Lausanne	Consulate (de facto)	1979	1994	Moved to Bern	
Togo	Africa	Lomé	Embassy*		1972		
Tonga	Oceania	Nukuʻalofa	Embassy* (Note: Resident in Suva, Rewa, Central, Fiji)		1998		
Uruguay	Americas	Montevideo	Embassy (Note: Resident in Buenos Aires, Argentina)	1957	1988		
Uruguay	Americas	Montevideo	Embassy (de facto)	1992	2002	Closure in 2002 intended to be temporary, no record since Reassigned to representative mission in Argentina	
United States	Americas	Washington, D.C.	Embassy (Note: Continues as a Taipei Economic and Cultural Representative Office in the United States.)**	1912	1978	Continuation of Qing legation, promoted to embassy in 1935	
United States	Americas	Chicago	Consulate** (Note: Continues as a Taipei Economic and Cultural Office in Chicago.)	1930	1979		
United States	Americas	Kansas City	Consulate	1974	1978		
United States	Americas	Kansas City	Consulate (de facto)	1985	2015	Moved to Denver	
Venezuela	Americas	Caracas	Embassy (de facto)	1974	2009		

== Naming conventions ==
Names of diplomatic missions by the host country Blue fields are full diplomatic missions using the name of the Republic of China/Taiwan, Red fields are de facto missions using the name of Taipei - unless otherwise noted.
	Total	No additional descriptor	Economic/Commercial and Cultural	Economic/Commercial	Trade (and Economic)	Liaison
Embassy	12	12: Belize; Eswatini; Guatemala; Haiti; Holy See; Marshall Islands; Palau; Paraguay; Saint Kitts and Nevis; Saint Lucia; Saint Vincent and the Grenadines; Tuvalu	0	0	0	0
Consulate-General	1	1: Paraguay	0	0	0	0
Office	57	1: South Korea	45: Argentina; Australia (x4); Austria; Brazil (x2); Brunei; Canada (x4); Chile; Czech Republic; Hong Kong; Israel; Japan; Jordan; Macau; Malaysia; Mexico; Myanmar; New Zealand (x2); Oman; Peru; Philippines; Spain; Switzerland; Thailand; United States (x12); Vietnam (x2)	4: Colombia; Ecuador; Papua New Guinea; United Arab Emirates	5: Bahrain; Fiji; Indonesia (x2); Nigeria	2: South Africa (x2)
Center	4	0	4: India (x3); Portugal	0	0	0
Representative Office	29	23: Belgium / EU; Ivory Coast; Denmark; Finland; France x2; Germany x4; Greece; Hungary; Ireland; Italy x2; Lithuania ("Taiwanese Representative Office"); Netherlands; Poland; Singapore; Slovakia; Somaliland ("Taiwan Representative Office"); United Kingdom x2	4: Japan; Russia; Saudi Arabia; United States	1: Kuwait	1: Mongolia	0
Mission	5	4: South Korea; Latvia; Sweden; WTO ("Permanent Mission of the Separate Customs Territory of Taiwan, Penghu, Kinmen and Matsu")	1: Turkey	0	0	0
Delegation	1		1: Switzerland	0	0	0
Total		41	55	5	6	2

== See also ==
- Foreign relations of Taiwan
- List of diplomatic missions in Taiwan
