= Simon Ko =

Taiwanese politician

Ko Shen-yeaw
- 柯森耀
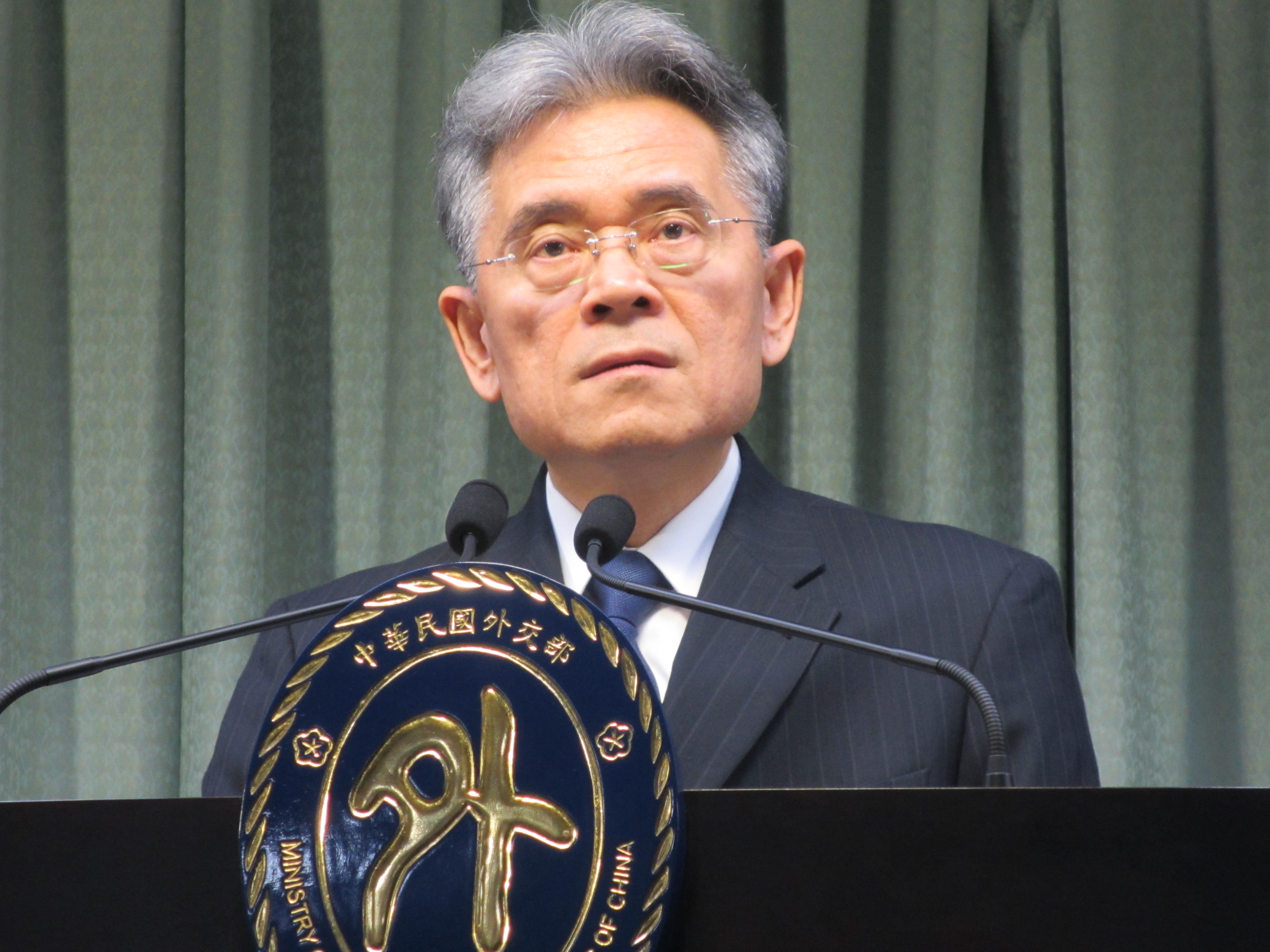

Taiwanese Representative to Spain
- In office 19 January 2016 – 2018
- Preceded by: Hou Ching-shan
- Succeeded by: José María Liu

Deputy Foreign Minister
- In office 1 September 2012 – 19 January 2016 Serving with Joseph Shih; Andrew Kao
- Minister: David Lin
- Vice: Vanessa Shih

Vice Foreign Minister
- In office January 2012 – 1 September 2012
- Minister: Timothy Yang

Taiwanese Ambassador to Panama
- In office 1 October 2008 – December 2011
- Preceded by: Tomas Hou
- Succeeded by: Diego L. Chou

Taiwanese Representative to Colombia
- In office August 2002 – October 2006

Personal details
- Education: National Chengchi University (BA, MA)

Ko Shen-yeaw (Chinese: 柯森耀; pinyin: Kē Sēnyào), also known by his English name Simon Ko, is a Taiwanese politician. He previously served as the Deputy Foreign Minister of Taiwan from September 2012 to January 2016.

== Education ==
Ko obtained his bachelor's and master's degrees in diplomacy and public administration from National Chengchi University in 1975 and 1978, respectively. He studied Spanish at the Spanish Language School in San José, Costa Rica from 1979 to 1981.

== Deputy foreign minister ==
In early July 2013, Ko said that his recent trip to Honduras is just another normal regular trip to one of ROC allies, which includes inspecting ROC embassy in that country, dismissing that Honduras might switch diplomatic relations from ROC to PRC due to the reluctance of ROC in giving extra grant to the country. However, Ko added that the ROC Ministry of Foreign Affairs will not mind for Honduras to have "unofficial" non-political relation with the PRC as long as the move doesn't affect the diplomatic relation with ROC.

Commenting on the decision made by Gambia to switch diplomatic relations from ROC to PRC on 14 November 2013, Ko said that the ROC government felt shock and regret at the move, in which it made ROC being recognized by only 22 countries around the world, in which most of them are developing nations. The move came in despite recent visit by President Ma Ying-jeou to the resource-poor nation in 2012 and also the USD 22 million fund donated to the nation for the construction of 42 km (26 mi)of road linking the western part of the country to the capital Banjul.

== See also ==
- Ministry of Foreign Affairs (Republic of China)
