= Spain–Taiwan relations =

- Taiwan: Spain

Diplomatic mission
- Taipei Economic and Cultural Office in Spain: Spanish Chamber of Commerce in Taiwan

Envoy
- Representative Li-Cheng Cheng: Director General Eduardo Euba Aldape

Spain–Taiwan relations are the bilateral and diplomatic relations between these two countries. Spain has a consular section in Taipei from the Spanish Consulate General in Manila, Philippines.

== Historical relations ==
Because the Pope's Bulls Alexander VI granted the lands that were left west of the Azores to Spain and those of the East to Portugal, through which the Treaty of Tordesillas (1494), the latter was the first to establish relations with China.

The Spanish approach to China came through the Philippines (1565). It is in Manila, founded by Miguel López de Legazpi, where the Spaniards come into contact with the commercial networks that arrived from the Chinese coast. Years later, in 1626, the Spaniards conquer Beautiful Island (Taiwan) and remain there until in 1642 they are expelled by the Dutch.

== Diplomatic relations ==
In March 1973, the diplomatic relationship between the Republic of China (Taiwan) and Spain was suspended, and in August of that same year, the Spanish Government established the Sun Yat-Sen Center in Madrid, to maintain and develop bilateral substantive relations whose name was changed to the Taipei Economic and Cultural Office in 1991. The current representative of the Taipei Economic and Cultural Office in Spain is Mr. Li-Cheng Cheng, who took office in February 2026.

Spain is one of the countries that does not recognize the Republic of China, but maintains unofficial relations with it. Spain was one of the countries that voted to abstain in the UN General Assembly with respect to resolution 2758 (1971), which required that any change in the representation of China in the UN be determined by a two-thirds majority vote.

== See also ==
- Taiwan–European Union relations
- Foreign relations of Spain
- Foreign relations of Taiwan
