= Liu Shanshan incident =

The Liu Shanshan incident was a 2011 labor rights and judicial case involving Taiwan and the United States. On November 11, 2011, Jacqueline Liu, also known as Liu Shanshan (Chinese: 劉姗姗), Representative of the Taipei Economic and Cultural Office (TECO) in Kansas City, Missouri, was detained by the FBI under suspicion of contract fraud involving a foreign domestic worker.

== Background ==
Jacqueline Liu had previously served in Taiwan's representative offices in Chicago and Boston, and held positions such as Section Chief of the Department of International Organizations and Deputy Secretary-General of the Coordination Council for North American Affairs at the Ministry of Foreign Affairs (MOFA). During the Chen Shui-bian administration, she served as Deputy Representative under Representatives Wu Hsin-hsing and Lee Chuan-tung at the Taipei Economic and Cultural Office (TECO) in the Philippines. Under President Ma Ying-jeou's administration, the MOFA appointed Liu as the Director of TECO in Kansas City, USA.

== Incident ==
On November 11, 2011, Liu was arrested by the FBI on charges of foreign labor contract fraud. Prosecutors promptly filed charges and transferred her case to court, where the judge ordered her to be held in custody.

According to the prosecution, Liu forced her Filipino domestic helper to work excessive hours while paying only one-third of the contractual wage, prohibited the helper from going out freely, and installed CCTV to monitor her. In August, the helper had left Liu's residence without notice and gone missing. After the incident, Liu immediately reported the case to U.S. authorities and fully cooperated with law enforcement in the search for the helper.

Three staff members at the Kansas City office were listed as cooperating witnesses. The second witness told investigators that Liu knowingly paid the helper less than what was stipulated in the contract and frequently yelled at her. She also underpaid a previous domestic helper and allegedly used physical force, leading to the helper becoming emotionally distressed and even losing appetite.

The third witness stated that one of his duties was to record all payments Liu made to the helper, which were significantly below the contractual amount. He provided investigators with signed receipts from the helper and confirmed that Liu also failed to pay the previous helper according to the contract.

The U.S. prosecutor handling the case stated that the relationship between Taiwan's TECO and the U.S. is unofficial, and therefore Liu might not qualify for diplomatic immunity. If convicted, she faced up to five years in prison.

A detention hearing was held at 11:37 p.m. Taipei time on November 16. Liu waived her right to post bail. The hearing lasted less than 10 minutes, and the judge ruled that Liu remain in custody. Her lawyer, Wolken, privately stated that Liu hoped to negotiate a plea deal with the prosecutor.

Liu admitted to the charge of "foreign labor contract fraud", acknowledging that she had paid only $450 and made the helper work overtime, instead of the $1,240 stated in the contract. She also paid $80,044.62 in compensation to two Filipino helpers. Liu's English in court was reportedly incomprehensible to both the court clerk and judge. When the judge asked if she understood the agreement, Liu responded "Thank you." After being asked again, she replied "No." Regarding whether the employment of the helper was a private or official matter, Liu claimed it was a private matter, which contradicted MOFA's position that the employment was for official duties.

At the second pretrial hearing, the judge temporarily rejected Liu’s plea agreement. If the judge ultimately refused to accept the agreement, Liu could face indictment by a grand jury.

On January 28, the judge accepted the plea deal. Liu was ordered to be deported immediately, pay $80,044 in restitution to the two Filipino helpers, and cover $4,700 for her incarceration expenses and the airfare for the U.S. immigration officer escorting her back to Taiwan. The two Filipino helpers were granted T visas for trafficking victims, allowing them to stay in the U.S. permanently.

Liu pleaded guilty and returned to Taiwan after being detained in the U.S. for more than two months. During the investigation, she continued to receive a monthly salary of NT$120,000.

On February 17, Liu issued a public statement solemnly denying any abuse or illegal misconduct, and expressed willingness to cooperate with the Control Yuan and other relevant agencies to clarify the facts of the case.

On February 22, Liu appeared as a defendant for questioning at the Taipei District Prosecutors Office. She denied abusing or defrauding her domestic helpers and claimed that her plea in the U.S. was made under duress and did not constitute an admission of guilt. After over three hours of questioning, she was released and told reporters upon leaving that she had already issued an apology statement, reiterating that she did not mistreat her helpers.

== U.S. Government response ==
=== Executive branch response ===
In response to questions from a Central News Agency reporter, a spokesperson for the U.S. Department of State stated that the U.S. government issues "E-1 Treaty Trader visas" to the Taipei Economic and Cultural Representative Office in the U.S. (TECRO) and to each TECO. The immunities and privileges enjoyed by Taiwan's representatives in the U.S. do not derive from their visa status, but from the Agreement on Privileges, Exemptions and Immunities signed between the United States and Taiwan in 1980. Under this agreement, Jacqueline Liu held the same status as consular officers, and her immunity was limited to acts performed within the scope of her official duties.

=== Judicial branch response ===
According to court testimony submitted by the FBI, Jacqueline Liu hired a woman in the Philippines in November 2010. After the woman, referred to as F.V. (female victim), arrived in Kansas City, USA, in March 2011, she was forced to work six days a week, 16 to 18 hours per day, and was only paid $400 to $450 per month. Liu also confiscated F.V.'s passport and B-1 work visa, and threatened to deport her back to the Philippines if she did not comply.

The court determined that Liu held an E-1 trade visa rather than an A-1 or A-2 visa used by diplomats, and therefore did not enjoy diplomatic immunity. The implications of this court ruling extended beyond Liu’s case, affecting all Taiwanese officials stationed in the U.S., including the Representative to the U.S., Jason Yuan. Since they all hold E-1 visas, the federal court records do not recognize them as diplomats. As such, if they were to be tried in court in the future, claims of diplomatic immunity would likely not be valid.

The primary reason for the lack of immunity is that the Republic of China (Taiwan) is not recognized as a sovereign state by the United States.

According to the U.S. Trafficking Victims Protection Act, the two abused Filipino helpers were identified as victims of "severe forms of trafficking in persons"' and thus were eligible to receive T visas from the U.S. government. These visas allow them to continue living and working legally in the U.S. and to access other benefits.

At the second pretrial hearing in Liu's case, the judge temporarily rejected the plea agreement. According to Article 5 of the plea agreement released by the U.S. Attorney’s Office for the Western District of Missouri, it was recommended that Liu be deported immediately after sentencing. If the judge accepted the agreement, checks for compensating the foreign domestic workers would take effect; if the agreement was rejected, the defense would have the right to withdraw from the deal.

== Response from the Republic of China (Taiwan) government and civil society ==
=== Executive branch response ===
- After Jacqueline Liu, was arrested by U.S. authorities on charges of foreign labor contract fraud, Taiwan's MOFA immediately lodged a strong protest and demanded her unconditional release. According to U.S. experts, diplomatic immunity might have applied had Liu's alleged actions been part of her official duties, but based on the facts obtained by U.S. investigators, this was clearly not the case. On the evening of November 11, Foreign Minister Timothy Yang stated that the U.S. action seriously violated the immunities Taiwan's diplomats are entitled to under the Agreement on Privileges, Exemptions and Immunities between Taiwan and the U.S. He protested to the American Institute in Taiwan (AIT) and demanded Liu's immediate release. Taiwan's Representative to the U.S., Jason Yuan, asserted, "The maid was hired by the government. This is not a personal issue."
- Minister Yang also expressed dissatisfaction that consular staff served as witnesses and ordered a strict internal disciplinary investigation. MOFA spokesperson James Chang later confirmed that the ministry was investigating the inappropriate conduct of the three witnesses. These actions led legislators to accuse MOFA of protecting Liu and punishing staff who told the truth. Director-General of MOFA's Department of North American Affairs, Steve Lin, stated that the staff spoke to the FBI to assist in locating the missing helper, not as formal witnesses. He criticized the prosecutors for using these conversations as testimony. However, under U.S. law, once such statements are submitted to the court, the individuals involved may be summoned as witnesses and required to testify.
- MOFA reiterated that Liu was arrested on charges of foreign labor contract fraud. Regarding the allegation that Liu misappropriated the helper's wages, MOFA explained that while the agreed monthly salary was indeed $1,240, the helper voluntarily deducted $790 to cover room, board, medical, and insurance costs, resulting in a net payment of $450. Liu also provided an additional $140 monthly grocery allowance, totaling $590—about NT$17,700 per month—matching the amount reported to MOFA for reimbursement. Spokesperson James Chang harshly criticized the FBI's actions, calling them "rude", and reaffirmed that the salary provided was not low.
- The Council of Labor Affairs clarified that MOFA's employment practices were exceptional and therefore not subject to Taiwan's Labor Standards Act.
- Before Liu's guilty plea, MOFA maintained her innocence and dispatched a special task force to the U.S. to assist her legal defense. The estimated legal costs reached US$300,000 (approximately NT$10–20 million), paid from public funds.
- After Liu pleaded guilty, Director-General Steve Lin stated that the legal case would not affect Taiwan-U.S. relations. MOFA continued to emphasize the legality of the employment contract and stated that whether Liu had committed corruption remained to be determined. MOFA expressed deep regret over Liu appearing in court in handcuffs and prison uniform.
- Premier Wu Den-yih commented that while MOFA's handling of the case was not perfect, it ultimately balanced diplomatic immunity, human rights, and national dignity satisfactorily.
- On December 14, Minister Yang stated that although Liu had reached a plea agreement, she would continue receiving her salary and be reassigned to a MOFA internal position.
- On February 17, following an administrative investigation, MOFA suspended Liu and referred the case to the Control Yuan for further review. MOFA stated that during suspension, Liu would receive half pay (approximately NT$26,000 per month) and could not apply for retirement benefits. On July 5, 2012, the Public Functionary Disciplinary Sanction Commission ruled that Liu had seriously damaged Taiwan’s national image and violated the Civil Service Act, imposing a two-year suspension from public service.

=== Prosecutorial investigation ===
On May 25, 2012, after detailed investigation, the Taipei District Prosecutors Office concluded that although Liu had accepted a plea deal in the U.S., Taiwan’s official documents, reimbursement records, and interviews—including a supplemental agreement signed by the helper consenting to deductions for food, housing, and insurance—showed that the case involved a civil dispute rather than criminal misconduct. As a result, prosecutors closed the case and declared Liu not guilty. The decision triggered public outrage online, with many criticizing the inconsistency of pleading guilty in the U.S. while being exonerated in Taiwan, calling it "one of the most ridiculous jokes in history".

=== Control Yuan investigation ===
The Control Yuan investigation revealed that after her Filipino helper left, Liu violated MOFA regulations by hiring a domestic worker from the People’s Republic of China. This was only discovered after Liu’s detention, when she instructed subordinates by phone to pay the worker’s salary. Furthermore, MOFA personnel discovered that the Chinese worker had used private computers and accessed the internet through secured embassy phones, raising serious national security and confidentiality concerns. MOFA had banned the hiring of Chinese nationals at overseas missions as early as May 1999 due to risks of espionage and infiltration. The Control Yuan concluded that Liu had violated local laws, failed in leadership, and committed serious misconduct. By a vote of 8 to 5, it passed an impeachment motion against Liu and issued a corrective measure to MOFA, calling for a thorough inspection of other diplomatic missions for similar violations.

=== Legislative Yuan Response ===
==== Kuomintang lawmakers ====
KMT legislators expressed distrust in MOFA’s narrative. Legislator Johnny Chiang questioned whether MOFA’s version of events would be convincing in court. Apple Daily quoted a legal expert saying that the “voluntary wage deduction” claim was implausible and would surely be challenged by U.S. prosecutors. Legislator Fei Hung-tai criticized MOFA for lacking internal oversight of overseas missions and demanded the establishment of effective personnel and auditing systems within three months. He lamented that scandals like this embarrassed officials during election season.

==== Democratic Progressive Party lawmakers ====
DPP spokesperson Chen Chi-mai stated on a political talk show that MOFA had "recklessly" defended Liu, who was accused of human rights violations, abuse, and corruption, thus shaming the entire country. He added that if the helper's wages were paid by MOFA, Liu was guilty of corruption. The DPP pointed out that the contract stipulated a $1,240 monthly wage and an 8-hour workday, with overtime compensation. Liu only paid around $450—less than NT$15,000—below Taiwan's minimum wage.

Legislator Tsai Huang-liang presented Liu's indictment documents and accused MOFA of shielding her from accountability. Caucus whip Wang Chin-chu emphasized that while MOFA could assert diplomatic immunity and recall Liu, it should never cover up abuse of foreign workers.

Legislator Huang Shu-ying cited labor law violations regarding work hours, minimum wage, and withholding of documents, stating that MOFA had broken both Taiwanese and U.S. laws. The Council of Labor Affairs, however, reiterated that MOFA's hiring practices fell outside normal legal constraints.

Legislator Huang Wei-che mocked the claim that the helper "voluntarily agreed" to wage deductions, questioning whether she was coerced into signing such statements by MOFA.

=== Labor groups' response ===
Son Yu-lien, Secretary-General of the Taiwan Labor Front, stated that the Labor Standards Act caps deductions for room and board at 30% of wages, while MOFA's deductions exceeded 60%. He emphasized that the helper's wage was below Taiwan's legal minimum, accusing MOFA of leading labor exploitation.

Taiwanese labor and human rights groups claimed Liu's abuse seriously damaged Taiwan's global image and questioned whether legal and compensation fees should be covered with public funds.

Hsu Chia-chun of the Taiwan International Workers' Association condemned the widespread abuse of "consent forms" used by employers to force migrant workers into signing away their rights—such as waiving rest days or surrendering personal documents—which constitutes exploitation under Civil Code Article 74 on unconscionable contracts.

==== Public Opinion and Media ====
Former TECRO Representative Joseph Wu noted that misconduct by senior overseas staff was not rare, citing previous scandals in Fiji and other missions. A senior MOFA official in Japan disclosed that bringing domestic workers from the Philippines to the U.S. while underpaying them was common among Taiwanese diplomats, saying Liu's case was "only the tip of the iceberg".

Former Foreign Minister Chen Chien-jen recounted that in 1979, following the U.S.-ROC diplomatic break, a student named Liu Shanshan (Jacqueline Liu) gave up her green card and wrote to President Chiang Ching-kuo expressing her patriotism and desire to return to Taiwan. At the time, she was seen as a highly patriotic youth.

Veteran journalist Liu Ping wrote in China Times that President Ma Ying-jeou should emulate Georgian President Eduard Shevardnadze by relinquishing diplomatic privileges and allowing U.S. courts to handle the case impartially.

Correspondent Tsao Yu-fen argued that the Liu case taught Taiwan's diplomats the importance of self-discipline, as misconduct could jeopardize not just personal careers but Taiwan's hard-won diplomatic achievements. She added that internal whistleblowing had collapsed, with disgruntled diplomats now bypassing internal procedures and turning directly to U.S. authorities.

==== Online reactions ====
Pro-Blue media reported that some overseas Taiwanese were angered, accusing the Filipino maid of being manipulative in order to obtain a green card. However, critics emphasized that regardless of intent, clear evidence of wrongdoing existed, and moral arguments were irrelevant in legal proceedings. Many netizens rejected these defenses, denouncing them as disgusting or even fabricated.

The majority of Taiwanese netizens believed Liu had committed a serious offense and brought shame to Taiwan on the international stage. Liu's name, which sounds like "6-3-3", was mocked online as it echoed President Ma’s failed campaign slogan (6% growth, 3% unemployment, US$30,000 per capita income), with some calling both "Ma's Achilles' heel".
