= IDIA =

IDIA may refer to:

- Idia, a historical figure in Benin
- Idia (moth), a genus of moths in the family Erebidae
- Institute of Diplomacy and International Affairs, a government agency in Taiwan
