= Hou Ching-shan =

Taiwanese philologist and politician

- 侯清山
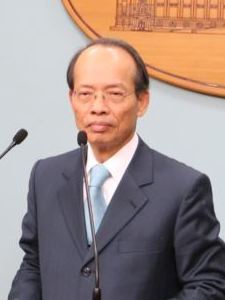

Deputy Minister of Foreign Affairs of the Republic of China
- In office 28 December 2015 – April 2018
- Minister: David Lee
- Deputy: Wu Chih-chung
- Vice: Lee Chen-jan
- Succeeded by: Kelly Hsieh

ROC Representative to Spain
- In office 2010–2015
- Preceded by: Simon Ko

Vice Minister of Foreign Affairs of the Republic of China
- In office 2006–2010
- Minister: James C. F. Huang; Francisco Ou; Timothy Yang

ROC Ambassador to El Salvador
- In office 2005–2006

ROC Deputy Representative to Uruguay
- In office 1994–2001

Personal details
- Born: 12 July 1950 (age 75)
- Education: Fu Jen Catholic University (BA); Complutense University of Madrid (MA, PhD)

Hou Ching-shan or Javier Ching-Shan Hou (Chinese: 侯清山; pinyin: Hóu Qīngshān, born 12 July 1950) is a Taiwanese philologist and diplomat. He was the Deputy Minister of Foreign Affairs in 2015–2018.

== Education ==
After graduating from Fu Jen Catholic University, Hou completed doctoral studies in Spain, where he earned a master's degree and his Ph.D. in philology from the Complutense University of Madrid.

== Ministry of Foreign Affairs ==
=== Central America visit ===
Hou and delegates accompanied President Chen Shui-bian for an official visit to Honduras, El Salvador and Nicaragua in August 2007.

=== São Tomé and Príncipe diplomatic cut ===
After São Tomé and Príncipe cut diplomatic relation with the ROC on 21 December 2016, Hou said that ROC relation with one of its other diplomatic ally is in yellow caution light, but he declined to comment which country it was.

== See also ==
- Executive Yuan
