= Taipei Commercial and Cultural Office, Buenos Aires =

Taipei Commercial and Cultural Office in Argentina 駐阿根廷臺北商務文化辦事處
- Oficina Comercial y Cultural de Taipei en Argentina

Agency overview
- Formed: 1973
- Preceding agency: Oficina Comercial de Taiwán
- Jurisdiction: Argentina; Uruguay
- Headquarters: Av. de Mayo 654, 4th floor, Buenos Aires
- Agency executive: Florencia Miao-hung Hsie, Representative
- Parent agency: Ministry of Foreign Affairs
- Website: www.roc-taiwan.org/ar_es/

The Taipei Commercial and Cultural Office in Argentina (Chinese: 駐阿根廷臺北商務文化辦事處; pinyin: Zhù Āgēntíng Táiběi Shāngwù Wénhuà Bànshìchù; Spanish: Oficina Comercial y Cultural de Taipei en Argentina) represents the interests of Taiwan in Argentina in the absence of formal diplomatic relations, functioning as a de facto embassy. It is located on Avenida de Mayo in Buenos Aires.

The office is headed by a Representative; since February 2023 this has been Florencia Miao-hung Hsie.

It also has responsibility for relations with Uruguay, and its consular district covers both countries. Relations with Uruguay were previously handled by the now-closed Oficina Economica de Taipei in Montevideo.

Its counterpart in Taiwan is the Argentina Trade and Cultural Office in Taipei.

== History ==
Diplomatic relations between Argentina and the Republic of China (ROC) started in 1945. Argentina switched recognition from the ROC to the People's Republic of China on 19 February 1972, and the ROC closed its embassy in Buenos Aires that year. In 1973 it opened the Oficina Comercial de Taiwán ("Taiwan Trade Office"), which adopted its present name in August 1995.

== Organizational structure ==
- Consular Affairs Division
- Economic Division
- Press and Culture Division
- Overseas Compatriots Division

== Representatives ==
- Lien Sheng Huang (from April 2014)
- Antonio Hsieh
- Miguel Tsao (25 June 2021 – February 2023)
- Florencia Miao-hung Hsie (February 2023 – present)

== See also ==
- Argentina–Taiwan relations
- List of diplomatic missions of Taiwan
- List of diplomatic missions in Argentina
