= Joseph Shih =

Taiwanese diplomat and politician

Joseph Shih Shih Ting
- 石定
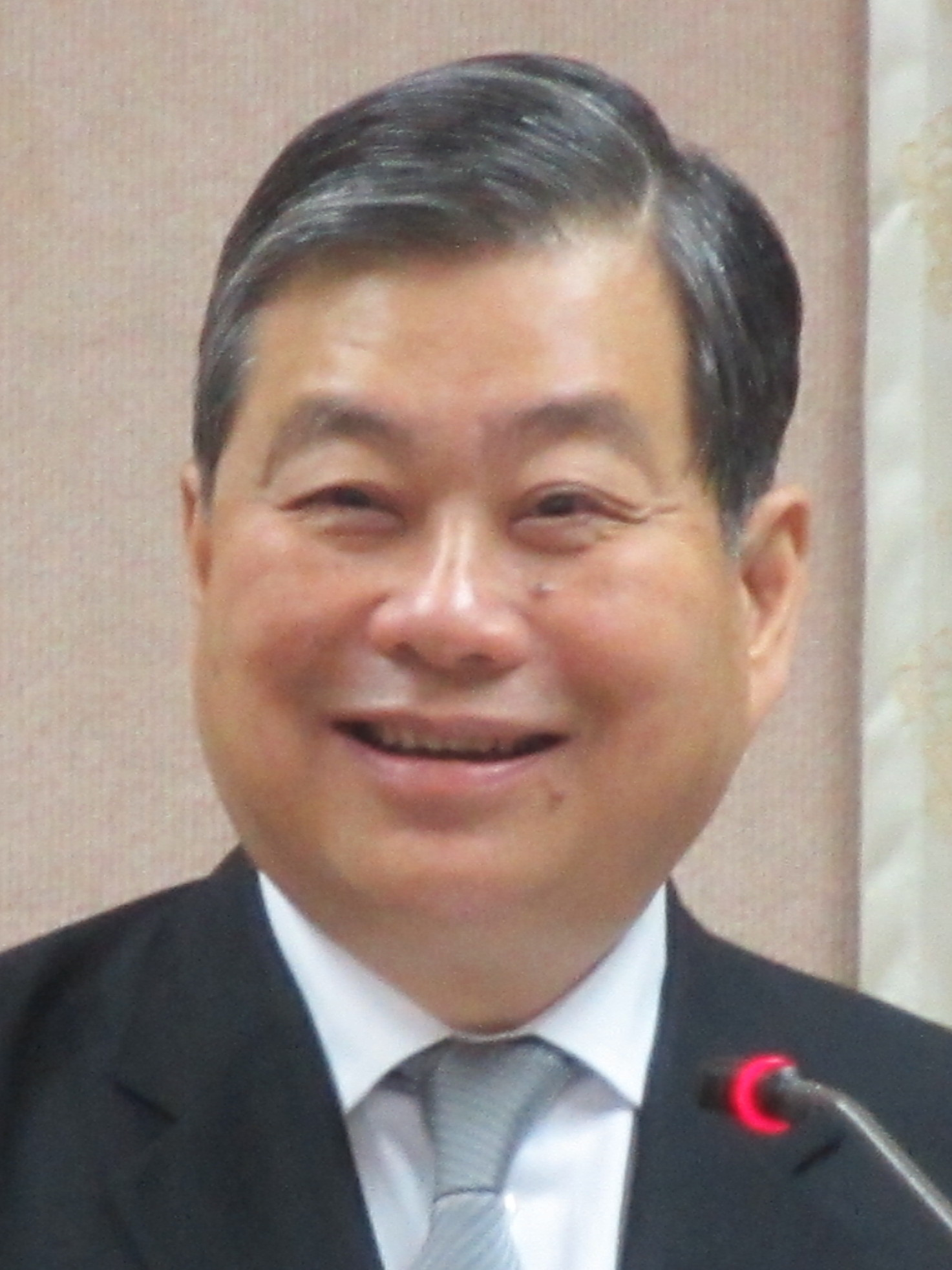

ROC Representative to South Korea
- In office 15 July 2014 – 05 September 2018
- Preceded by: Benjamin Liang
- Succeeded by: Daniel Diann-wen Tang

Deputy Minister of Foreign Affairs of the Republic of China
- In office 1 March 2013 – 15 July 2014
- Minister: David Lin
- Vice: Vanessa Shih
- Preceded by: Tung Kuo-yu
- Succeeded by: Andrew Kao

Ambassador of the Republic of China to Belize
- In office 5 February 2006 – 9 April 2010
- Preceded by: Tasi Erh-huang
- Succeeded by: Wu Tzu-dan

ROC Representative to New Zealand
- In office 2002–2006

ROC Deputy Representative to South Africa
- In office 1998–1999

Personal details
- Education: National Chengchi University (BA); University of Pittsburgh (MA); Georgetown University (PhD)

Shih Ting (Chinese: 石定; pinyin: Shí Dìng), also known by his English name Ting Joseph Shih, is a Taiwanese diplomat and politician. He was the nation's representative to South Korea from 2014 to 2018, and the Deputy Minister of the Ministry of Foreign Affairs of the Executive Yuan from 2013 to 2014.

== ROC Foreign Affairs Deputy Ministry ==
=== 2013 Korean crisis ===
During the 2013 North Korean crisis, in mid April 2013 Shih said that the ROC government had no plan to immediately evacuate the more than 16,000 Taiwanese citizens then living in South Korea. He added that the Taipei Mission in Korea had prepared a task force and was ready for any possible scenario.

=== Taiwanese fisherman shooting incident ===
After the shooting incident of a Taiwanese fisherman by a Philippine government vessel on 9 May 2013 in disputed waters in the South China Sea, Shih was told that the shooting was a warning shot to drive the Taiwanese vessel out of the disputed water. However, he rejected that it was warning shooting because the ROC Coast Guard Administration discovered 32 bullet holes in the Taiwanese vessel. He then summoned Antonio Basilio, Philippine Representative to Taiwan, to explain the Philippine stance on the matter. He also demanded the Philippine government officially apologize over the killing instead of only expressing regret.
