= Argentina–Taiwan relations =

- Argentina: Taiwan

Diplomatic mission
- Argentina Trade and Cultural Office: Taipei Economic and Cultural Office in Argentina

The relationship between the Argentine Republic and the Republic of China (commonly known as Taiwan) is referred to as Argentina–Taiwan relations. From 1945 to 1972, the two countries had official diplomatic relations, and after the severance of diplomatic relations, they set up representative offices in each other's capitals with the functions of embassies.

== History ==
The Republic of China established its embassy in Buenos Aires, the capital, and the Argentine Republic established its embassy in Chongqing, the capital, on 30 May 1945, marking the beginning of diplomatic relations between the two countries at the ambassadorial level. On December 4, 1945, the first ambassador to the Republic of China submitted his credentials as part of the two nations' ambassadorial exchange. On April 13, 1946, the first ambassador to Argentina submitted his credentials.

The People's Republic of China and Argentina established diplomatic relations on 16 February 1972. However, due to the influence of Xu Shaochang, the Republic of China's ambassador to Argentina, the two countries did not remove their embassies from one another and the Republic of China did not formally break off diplomatic ties. Following repeated requests from the People's Republic of China, Argentina declared in July to terminate diplomatic ties with the latter. On February 19, the Republic of China officially declared the end of diplomatic ties between the two nations. This recognition came about posthumously. The embassy in Argentina closed on August 10.

Argentina and ten other nations denounced the People's Republic of China during the World Health Assembly (WHA) plenary session in May 1997. A team from the Argentine Chamber of Deputies visited Taiwan on June 9, 2002, under the leadership of Jorge Alberto Escobar, chairman of the committee responsible for foreign affairs. Ten Argentine Members of Parliament issued a statement in May 2019 demanding Taiwan be invited to the World Health Assembly.

A letter was sent to Tedros Adhanom Ghebreyesus, Secretary-General of the World Health Organization (WHO), in May 2020 by 71 Taiwanese members of parliament from Argentina and nine other American countries, collectively known as the "Formosa Club." The letter urged the WHO to acknowledge Taiwan's urgent need to join the global health system.

== Immigration ==
Immigrants have been the main force behind Taiwan's presence in Argentina. The well-known Barrio Chino (Chinatown) neighborhood in Bajo Belgrano, Buenos Aires, was originally centered on Calle Taiwán, referring to the wave of Taiwanese immigrants who settled there in the early 1980s. Meanwhile, the supermarkets that Argentines refer to as "chinos" were initially owned by Taiwanese immigrants, who later sold them to Chinese immigrants who came to the area in great numbers ten years later.A confluence of political, economic, and educational forces led to the largest wave of immigration from Taiwan.

== Trade ==
According to data from Taiwan's Customs office, exports to Argentina were US$267.59 million, up 42.4 percent, while imports from Argentina totaled US$453.25 million, a notable increase of 73.3 percent.

With effect from May 10, 2021, Argentina has levied anti-dumping duties on bicycles and foam-grade polystyrene on Taiwan (an anti-dumping investigation was initiated on May 26, 2020).

== See also ==
- Foreign relations of Argentina
- Foreign relations of Taiwan
- Argentina–China relations
