= Leo Chen-jan Lee =

Taiwanese diplomat and politician

Vice Minister of Foreign Affairs of the Republic of China
- In office 18 January 2016 – 2018
- Minister: David Lee
- Deputy: Hou Ching-shan, Wu Chih-chung
- Preceded by: Vanessa Shih
- Succeeded by: José María Liu

ROC Representative to Sweden
- In office 2014–2016
- Succeeded by: Daniel T.C. Liao

ROC Deputy Representative to the United States
- In office 2010–2014
- Representative: Jason Yuan; King Pu-tsung

ROC Ambassador to Saint Vincent and the Grenadines
- In office 2008–2010

Personal details
- Education: National Taiwan University (BA); University of London (MA)

Lee Chen-jan (Chinese: 李澄然; pinyin: Lǐ Chéngrán) is a Taiwanese diplomat and politician. He was the Vice Minister of Foreign Affairs in the Executive Yuan in 2016–2018. From 2023, he has been serving as the vice chairman of the Association of Foreign Relations (AFR) since his election in late 2022.

== Education ==
Lee obtained his bachelor's degree from National Taiwan University in 1976 and master's degree from University of London in the United Kingdom in 1982.
