= China–Kuwait relations =

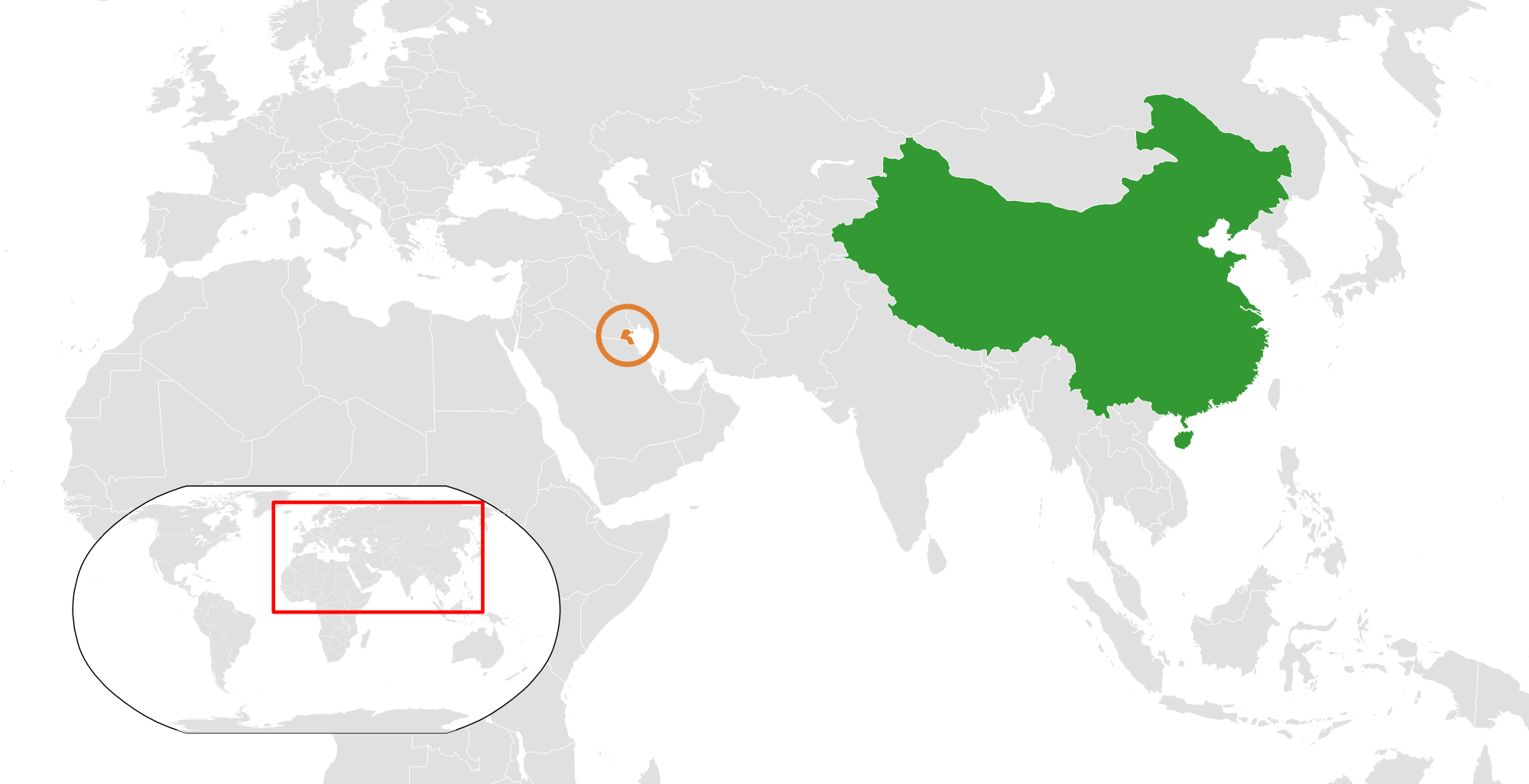

- China: Kuwait

Diplomatic mission
- Kuwaiti Embassy, Beijing: Chinese Embassy, Kuwait City

China–Kuwait relations refers to the bilateral relations between the People's Republic of China (PRC) and the State of Kuwait.

== History ==
The two countries established diplomatic relations on March 22, 1971. Kuwait was the first Gulf country to recognize the PRC. In 1990, China voted for every United Nations Security Council resolution condemning the Iraqi invasion of Kuwait, but abstained one put foreign troops on the ground due to its non-interference policy. Kuwait was the first Gulf country to sign a military cooperation deal with China in 1995. In the 1990s, Kuwait bought $186 million worth of Chinese arms. Kuwait has supported China on political issues such as Western sanctions over Tiananmen, Hong Kong National Security Law, and China's policies in Xinjiang.

In 2018, China and Kuwait signed a strategic partnership. In July 2018, the State Administration for Science, Technology and Industry for National Defence signed an agreement with the Government of Kuwait to increase cooperation in the defense industry. China also agreed to increase investment in the Kuwaiti energy sector. In July 2019, UN ambassadors of 37 countries, including Kuwait, have signed a joint letter to the UNHRC defending China's treatment of Uyghurs in the Xinjiang region. In June 2020, Kuwait was one of 53 countries backed the Hong Kong national security law at the United Nations. On March 22, 2021, General Secretary of the Chinese Communist Party Xi Jinping and Kuwaiti Emir Nawaf Al-Ahmad Al-Jaber Al-Sabah exchanged congratulatory messages on the 50th anniversary of the establishment of diplomatic relations between China and Kuwait. Chinese Premier Li Keqiang and Kuwaiti Prime Minister Sabah Al-Ahmad Al-Jaber Al-Sabah exchanged congratulatory messages.

== Economic relations ==
The governments of China and Kuwait have signed a trade agreement, an agreement on the encouragement and protection of investment, an agreement on the establishment of a joint economic and trade committee, and an agreement on the avoidance of double taxation. Since 1955, the two countries have started direct private trade. In 2008, the trade volume between China and Kuwait was US$6.784 billion, of which China exported US$1.744 billion and imported US$5.04 billion. China's main exports are mechanical and electrical products, high-tech products, textiles, etc., and its main imports are crude oil and petrochemical products. As of 2022, Kuwait ran a trade deficit with China.

Kuwait Investment Authority (KIA) bought a $720 million stake in Industrial and Commercial Bank of China in 2006. By 2011, KIA had around $5.6 billion invested in Chinese companies, including the Agricultural Bank of China and CITIC Securities. Since 1982, the Kuwait Fund for Arab Economic Development has lent nearly $1 billion to China to finance provincial infrastructure projects.

Kuwait joined the Belt and Road Initiative in 2018.

== See also ==
- Kuwait–Taiwan relations
