= Waijiaobu =

Waijiaobu (外交部) is the Chinese name for a Ministry of Foreign Affairs. When untranslated in English text, it especially refers to:

- Ministry of Foreign Affairs (Republic of China), of all China from 1927 to 1949 then just Taiwan since 1949
- Ministry of Foreign Affairs of the People's Republic of China, of all China since 1949
