= Taipei Economic and Culture Office, Vienna =

Taipei Economic and Culture Office in Austria 駐奧地利台北經濟文化代表處 Taipei Wirtschafts- und Kulturbüro in Österreich
Agency overview
- Formed: 1972 (as Institute of Chinese Culture)
- Jurisdiction: Austria; Liechtenstein
- Headquarters: Vienna, Austria
- Agency executive: Suan-Yung Liu, Representative
- Website: Taipei Economic and Culture Office in Austria

The Taipei Economic and Culture Office in Austria; (Chinese: 駐奧地利台北經濟文化代表處; pinyin: Zhù Àodìlì Táiběi Jīngjì Wénhuà Dàibiǎo Chù; German: Taipei Wirtschafts- und Kulturbüro in Österreich) represents the interests of Taiwan in Austria in the absence of formal diplomatic relations, functioning as a de facto embassy. Its counterpart in Taiwan is the Austrian Office in Taipei.

== History ==
The first representative office of Taiwan in Austria was known as the Institute of Chinese Culture, which was established in 1972.

== Representatives ==
- Chen Lien-gene (-2016)
- Vanessa Shih (2016-)
- Katharine Chang (September 2020-November 2024)
- Suan-Yung Liu (November 2024-)

== See also ==
- List of diplomatic missions of Taiwan
- List of diplomatic missions in Austria
