= Kuwait–Taiwan relations =

Bilateral relations between Kuwait and Taiwan

- Kuwait: Taiwan

Diplomatic mission
- Taipei Commercial Representative Office in the State of Kuwait

Envoy
- Ken Hu (胡琪斌)

Kuwait–Taiwan relations refer to the relations between Kuwait (officially the State of Kuwait) and Taiwan (officially the Republic of China, ROC). Kuwait recognises the People's Republic of China (PRC) and does not maintain formal diplomatic ties with Taiwan, but the two countries maintain informal relations and cooperation through representative offices, trade missions, and economic exchange.

== History ==
Kuwait and Taiwan have enjoyed economic and commercial interaction for decades, with Taiwan importing crude oil and petroleum products from Kuwait as early as the 1990s. Since then, trade-promotion activities, trade exhibitions and commercial delegations have deepened ties between Taiwan and Kuwait, despite the absence of formal diplomatic recognition.

In 2010, Taiwan's BES Engineering Corporation won a lengthy legal battle against Kuwait's Ministry of Public Works, securing compensation of 2.36 million Kuwaiti dinars (approximately US$8.13 million). The case originated from a 1987 public-construction contract awarded to BES, which was halted following the outbreak of the Gulf War in 1990, causing significant equipment losses. After unsuccessful negotiations, BES filed a lawsuit in Kuwait in 1994 under a special article of its contract. Following 16 years of litigation and six appeals, the Kuwaiti Supreme Court ruled in favour of BES on 9 February 2010, and the firm received compensation on 7 May 2010. Although Taiwan's Ministry of Foreign Affairs and its representative office in Kuwait were not directly involved in the proceedings, they maintained close contact with BES's legal representative, Maryam A. Marafi, to ensure protection of the company's rights.

== Taipei Commercial Representative Office in the State of Kuwait ==
The Taipei Commercial Representative Office in the State of Kuwait (Chinese: 駐科威特王國臺北商務代表處; pinyin: Zhù Kēwēitè wángguó táiběi shāngwù dàibiǎo chù) represents the interests of Taiwan in the State of Kuwait in the absence of formal diplomatic relations, functioning as a de facto embassy. Opened in April 1986, the Taipei Commercial Representative Office in the State of Kuwait (TCRO), located in Al-Jabriya, Hawally, Kuwait City, serves as Taiwan's de facto representation. It handles trade, investment, cultural and consular affairs for Taiwanese interests in Kuwait.

The aim of the representative office is to further bilateral cooperation between Kuwait and Taiwan in the fields of economics, culture, education and research. In addition, it offers consular services and the consular jurisdiction of the office also extends to the State of Qatar.

In August 1990, following the outbreak of the Iraqi invasion of Kuwait, a total of 143 employees, family members and expatriates working with the Commercial Office in Kuwait, CPC Corporation, BES Engineering Corporation and the Taiwan External Trade Development Council evacuated Kuwait and arrived in Jordan. The government of Taiwan dispatched a special plane to take them back to Taiwan. After the liberation of Kuwait following the 1991 Gulf War, the office's operations resumed on March 27, 1991.

On 26 August 1996, the name of the office was changed to Taipei Commercial Representative Office in the State of Kuwait.

Kuwait does not maintain a dedicated diplomatic mission in Taiwan; its interactions with Taiwan are conducted through trade and economic offices and via its representation to other jurisdictions.

== Economic relations ==
Trade and investment form the core of the Kuwait–Taiwan relationship. According to Taiwan's representatives, Kuwait ranks among Taiwan's significant trading partners in the Middle East and was, at one point, Taiwan's 16th largest trading partner.

In 1994, Taiwan's delegation noted that it was importing approximately 40,000 barrels per day of Kuwaiti crude oil, highlighting the early energy-linkage between the two sides.

Trade missions organised by Taiwan's trade agencies into Kuwait regularly showcase Taiwanese electronics, auto-parts, and machinery toward Gulf markets. For example, a Taiwanese trade delegation in Kuwait in 2017 promoted diverse Taiwanese goods including cosmetics, electronics and machine parts.

Kuwait and Taiwan also cooperate in educational and academic exchange, for example, National Taiwan University maintains a scholarly-exchange agreement with Kuwait University.

== Cultural and educational exchanges ==
Cultural-and-educational links have grown alongside trade ties. The Taiwan-Kuwait trade office celebrated the National Day of Taiwan with Kuwaiti officials and business-leaders in October 2019, marking increasing visibility of the relationship.

Taiwanese technical and educational cooperation programs, including academic partnerships and scholarships, support mutual understanding and people-to-people ties between the two sides.

== See also ==
- Foreign relations of Taiwan
- Foreign relations of Kuwait
- Taiwan–Middle East relations
