= José María Liu =

Taiwanese diplomat

- 劉德立

Representative of Taiwan to Spain
- In office September 2018 – July 2023
- Preceded by: Simon Ko
- Succeeded by: Vivia Chang

Vice Minister of Foreign Affairs
- Minister: Joseph Wu
- Preceded by: Lee Chen-jan
- Succeeded by: Miguel Tsao

Ambassador of Taiwan to Panama
- In office 2015–2017
- Succeeded by: Miguel Tsao

Ambassador of Taiwan to Paraguay
- In office 2011–2015

Personal details
- Education: Tamkang University (BA); Fu Jen Catholic University (MA)

José María Liu (Chinese: 劉德立; pinyin: Liú Délì) is a Taiwanese diplomat.
