= Taipei Economic and Cultural Representative Office =

Overseas representative offices of Taiwan

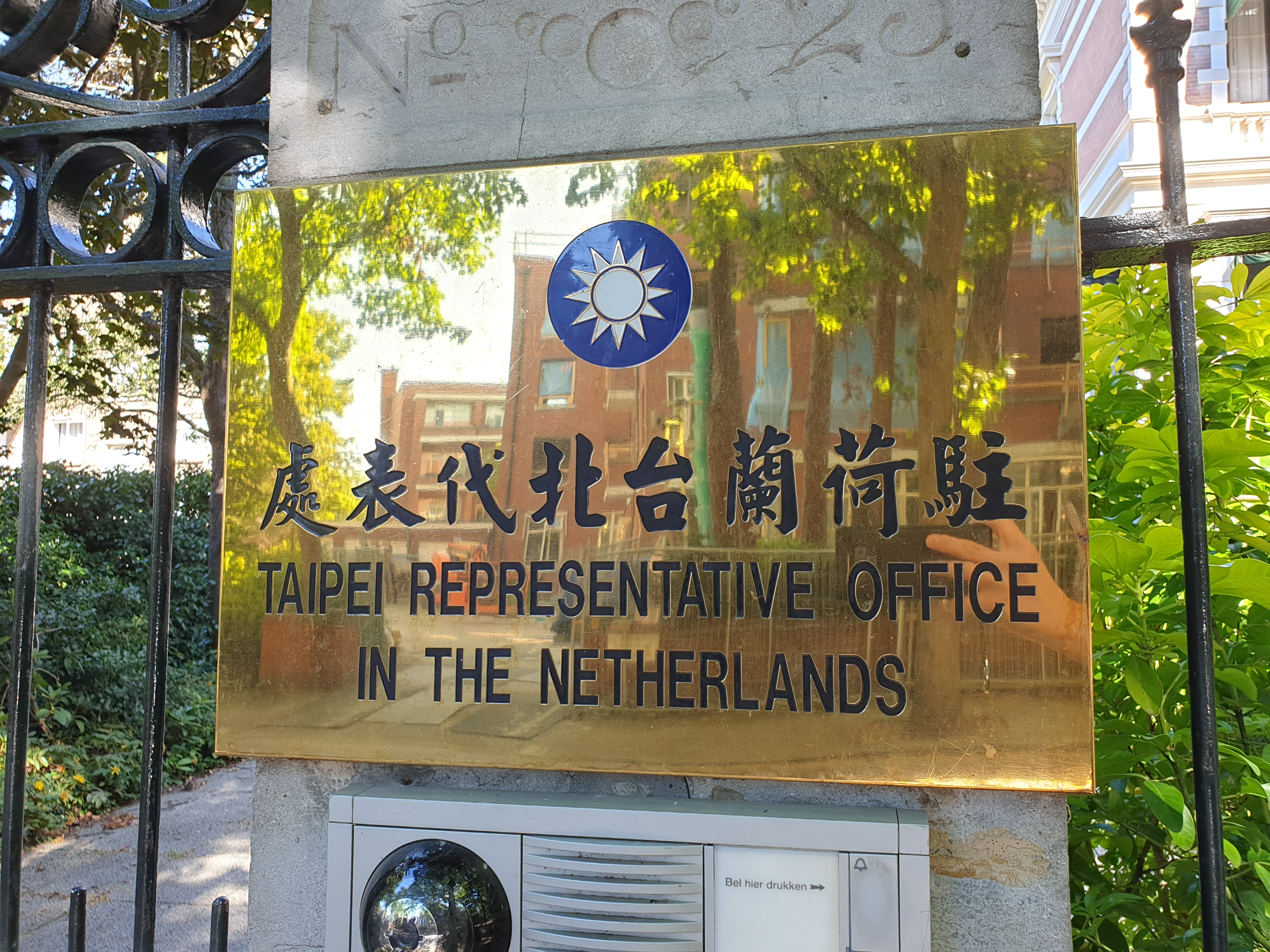
- Taipei Representative Office in The Hague, Netherlands
- Traditional Chinese: 臺北經濟文化辦事處
- Simplified Chinese: 台北经济文化办事处
Transcriptions
Standard Mandarin
- Hanyu Pinyin: Táiběi Jīngjì Wénhùa Bànshìchù
- Wade–Giles: T'aipei Chingchi Wenhua Panshihch'u
- Tongyong Pinyin: Táiběi Jǐngjì Wúnhùa Bànshìhchù
- Yale Romanization: Táiběi Jǐngjì Wénhwà Bànshr̀chù
Southern Min
- Hokkien POJ: Tâi-pak Keng-chè Bûn-hòa Pān-sū-chhù

The Taipei Economic and Cultural Representative Office (TECRO), also known as Taipei Economic and Cultural Office (TECO), Taipei Representative Office (TRO) or Taipei Mission, is an alternative diplomatic institution serving as a de facto embassy or a consulate of the Republic of China (ROC, commonly referred to as Taiwan) to exercise the foreign affairs and consular services in specific countries which have established formal diplomatic relations with the People's Republic of China (PRC, commonly referred to as China). The PRC denies the legitimacy of the ROC as a sovereign state and claims the ROC-controlled territories as an integral part of its territory. An exclusive mandate, namely One-China principle, requires that any country wishing to establish a diplomatic relationship with the PRC must first sever any formal relationship with the ROC. According to The Fletcher Forum of World Affairs, "non-recognition of the Taiwanese government is a prerequisite for conducting formal diplomatic relations with the PRC—in effect forcing other governments to choose between Beijing and Taipei." As a result, these countries only allow the ROC to establish representative offices instead of a fully-fledged embassy or consulate for the purpose of conducting practical bilateral relations without granting full diplomatic recognition.

Except in Lithuania and Somaliland (opened in 2020), all offices use the capital city "Taipei" and refrain from using the name "Taiwan" or the "Republic of China", since the term "Taipei" avoids implying that Taiwan is a different country on par with the PRC or that there are "Two Chinas", the PRC and the ROC, in order to diminish the obstacles of building pragmatic diplomacy and sidestep the political status of Taiwan. The first attempt of using the name "Taiwan" in a Taiwanese diplomatic mission within a non-diplomatic state was when Lithuania broke the tradition with the name Taiwanese Representative Office in Lithuania in 2021. In response the PRC expelled Lithuania's embassy staff from Beijing and downgraded diplomatic relations to charge d'affaires status. Attempts by other countries, including Fiji, to allow ROC government to change the representative office to indicate "Taiwan" later failed and were reversed under pressure from PRC government.

On the other side, offices located in Taiwan usually also use the term "Taipei", though the United States, Japan, and Somaliland (but not Lithuania) use "Taiwan" (for example the American Institute in Taiwan).

TECROs state that their aim is "to promote bilateral trade, investment, culture, science and technology exchanges and cooperation, as well as better understanding", and provide common consular services towards overseas Taiwanese, such as issuing visas and passports.

TECROs in the United States enjoy many diplomatic privileges such as extraterritoriality, providing consular protection and their staff have diplomatic immunity. Other countries also establish reciprocal representative offices in Taiwan, such as the American Institute in Taiwan, Canadian Trade Office in Taipei and Japan–Taiwan Exchange Association.

== History ==
Following the admission of the PRC to the United Nations in 1971, many countries began to establish diplomatic relations with the government in Beijing, and as a consequence, ended diplomatic relations with the Nanjing-based ROC Government stationed in Taipei. In order to maintain trade and cultural ties with countries with which it no longer had diplomatic relations, Taiwan established representative offices in these countries, often replacing its former embassies.

Before the 1990s, the names of these offices would vary considerably from country to country, usually omitting any reference to "Taiwan" or "Republic of China", instead referring to "East Asia", "Far East" or "Free China". They would also describe themselves as "centres" or "offices", concerned with trade, tourism, culture or information, thereby emphasising their private and unofficial status, despite being staffed by Ministry of Foreign Affairs personnel.

For example, in Japan, the former ROC Embassy was replaced by the "Association of East Asian Relations" (AEAR) in 1972. In Malaysia, following the closure of the consulate general in Kuala Lumpur in 1974, an office known as the Far East Travel and Trade Centre was established. In the Philippines, the former embassy in Manila was replaced by the "Pacific Economic and Cultural Center", established in 1975. In Thailand, the former embassy in Bangkok was replaced by the "Office of the Representative of China Airlines" in 1975. This was later renamed the Far East Trade Office in 1980.

In the United States, Taipei's mission, established in 1979, was known as the "Coordination Council for North American Affairs" (CCNAA). As of 2019, it has been renamed "Taiwan Council for US Affairs."

In the United Kingdom, Taiwan was represented by the "Free Chinese Centre", established in 1963. In West Germany, it was represented by a Büro der Fernost-Informationen ("Far East Information Office") established in 1972. In Spain, the office, established in 1973, was known as the Centro Sun Yat-sen ("Sun Yat-sen Centre"). In the Netherlands, the office was known as the "Far East Trade Office".

However, in the late 1980s, these offices began using the name "Taipei" in their titles due to confusion on their functions, particular those needing visa to travel to ROC areas. Using the "Taipei" is more familiar as it was recently used in the Olympics after "Chinese Taipei" Olympics team rejoined in 1981. In May 1992, the AEAR offices in Japan became Taipei Economic and Cultural Representative Offices. The "Free Chinese Centre" in London was similarly renamed the "Taipei Representative Office". In September 1994, the Clinton Administration announced that the CCNAA office in Washington could similarly be called the Taipei Economic and Cultural Representative Office.

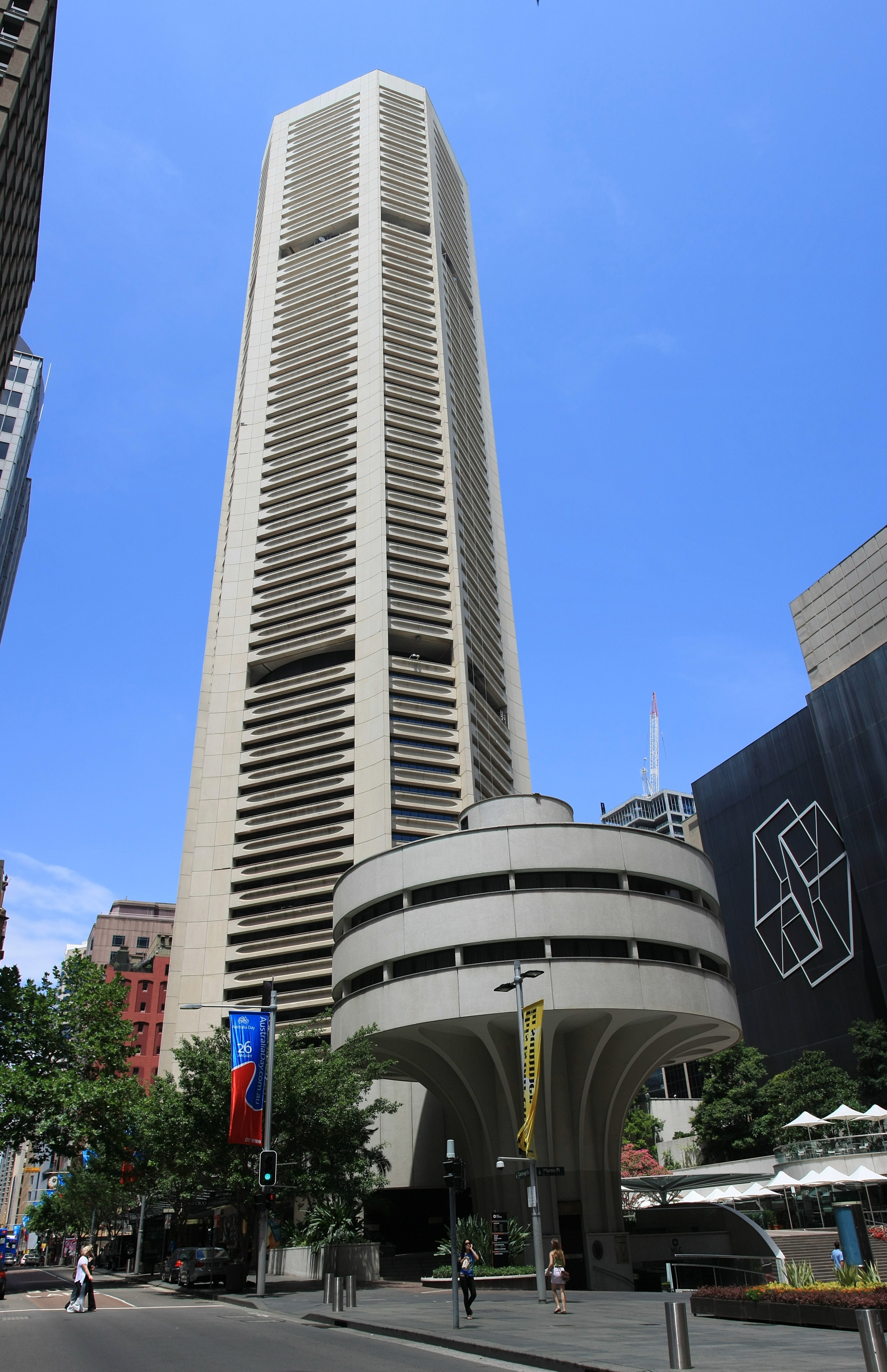
The building hosting TECO branch office in Sydney, Australia

Earlier in 1989, the "Pacific Economic and Cultural Center" in Manila became the "Taipei Economic and Cultural Office in the Philippines". In 1991, the "Taiwan Marketing Service" office in Canberra, Australia, established in 1988, also became a "Taipei Economic and Cultural Office", along with the "Far East Trading Company" offices in Sydney and Melbourne.

Other names are still used elsewhere; for example, the mission in Moscow is formally known as the "Representative Office in Moscow for the Taipei-Moscow Economic and Cultural Coordination Commission", the mission in New Delhi is known as the "Taipei Economic and Cultural Center". The mission in Pretoria is known as the "Taipei Liaison Office".

The two most recent ones to change their official names, in Papua New Guinea and in Jordan, both use the name Taipei Economic and Cultural Office (Chinese: 臺北經濟文化辦事處).

== TECRO in the United States ==
Period	Name	Chinese
Jan 1, 1912 — May 17, 1935	Legation of the Republic of China in the United States of America	中華民國駐美利堅國公使館
May 17, 1935 — Dec 31, 1978	Embassy of the Republic of China in the United States of America	中華民國駐美利堅合眾國大使館
March 1, 1979 — Oct 10, 1994	Coordination Council for North American Affairs, Office in the United States	北美事務協調委員會駐美國辦事處
Oct 10, 1994 — present	Taipei Economic and Cultural Representative Office in the United States	駐美國臺北經濟文化代表處

Prior to 1979, the Republic of China (with government on Taiwan since 1949) was represented in Washington, D.C. by its embassy, occupying the building now used by the Haitian embassy. After the transfer of recognition to the People's Republic of China, the government of the Republic of China was no longer recognized by the United States, and therefore no longer entitled to use the former embassy, with its diplomatic mission replaced by a non-diplomatic-titled representative office. The mission serves as the office of the Coordination Council for North American Affairs (CCNAA) in Washington, D.C., established in March 1979 as the counterpart to the American Institute in Taiwan, after the United States established diplomatic relations with the People's Republic of China. The council was renamed Taiwan Council for U.S. Affairs in 2019.

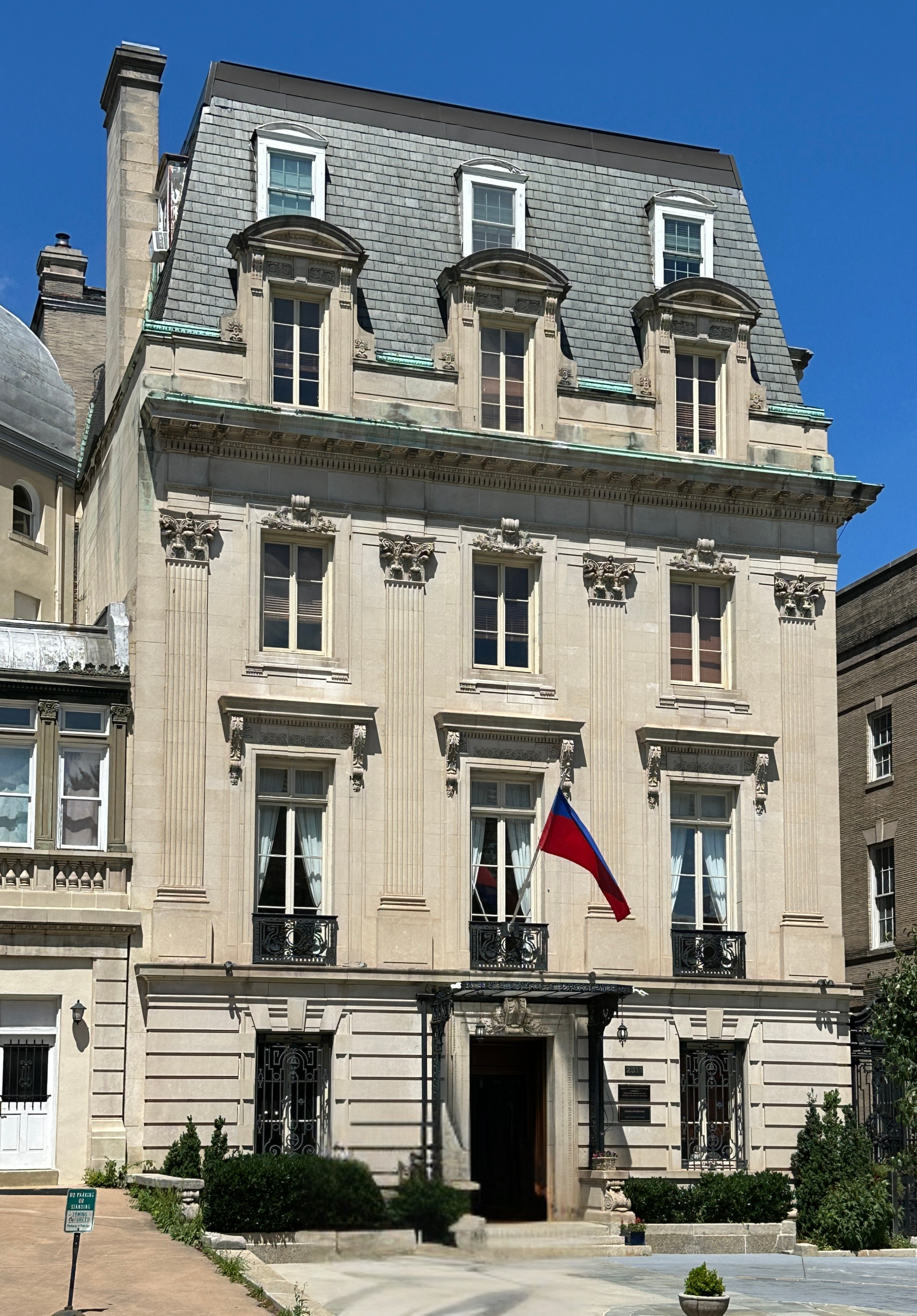
The ROC embassy in the US from 1944 to 1978, on Embassy Row (now the Embassy of Haiti)

In 1994, as a result of the Clinton Administration's Taiwan Policy Review, the name of the CCNAA office in Washington, D.C. (which functioned as an embassy) was changed to Taipei Economic and Cultural Representative Office (TECRO). Similarly, the names of the twelve other CCNAA offices (which functioned as consulates) were changed to Taipei Economic and Cultural Office (TECO).

In September 2020, the US Ambassador to the United Nations Kelly Craft met with Amb. James K.J. Lee, Director-General of the Taipei Economic and Cultural Office in New York, who was secretary-general in Taiwan's Ministry of Foreign Affairs until July, for lunch in New York City in what was the first meeting between a top Taiwan official and a United States ambassador to the United Nations. Craft said she and Lee discussed ways the US can help Taiwan become more engaged within the U.N.

== TECRO in Japan ==
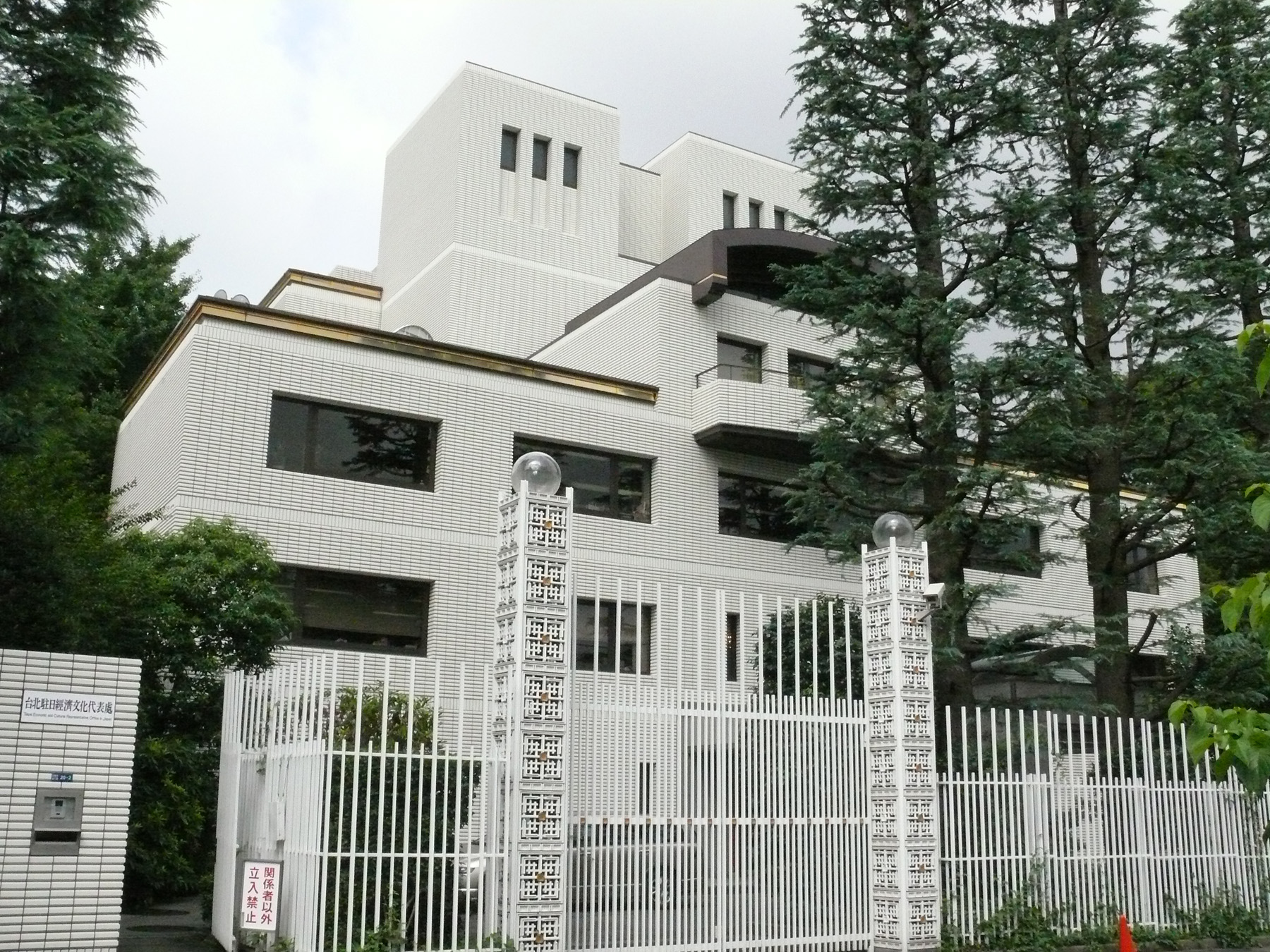
TECRO in Japan

Diplomatic relations between the Republic of China and Japan were broken off in September 1972. For practical reasons, the Association of East Asian Relations (AEAR), was established two months after the Japan-China Joint Communique was signed. EARA had offices in Taipei, Tokyo, Osaka, and Fukuoka. In 1992, Japan authorized the change in name of AEAR to TECRO.

== Representations in the PRC special administrative regions ==
=== Hong Kong ===
In Hong Kong, from 1966, Taiwan was represented by the 'Chung Hwa Travel Service', a name chosen to avoid upsetting Beijing. On 20 July 2011, as a result of warming relations between Taiwan and Beijing, the name was formally changed to the Taipei Economic and Cultural Office, bringing it into line with other Republic of China representative offices around the world.

=== Macau ===
In Macau, from 1989 to 1999, Taiwan was represented by the 'Taipei Trade and Tourism Office', Taiwan's first-time representation in Macau after Kuomintang's expulsion from Macau as the consequence of the December 3rd Incident in 1966. From 1999 to 2011, Taiwan was represented by the 'Taipei Economic and Cultural Center'. On 13 May 2012, the name was formally changed to the Taipei Economic and Cultural Office.

== Taipei Representative Office in Norway ==
Taipei Representative Office in Norway 駐挪威代表處
Agency overview
- Formed: 1980 (as Taipei Trade Centre)
- Dissolved: 30 September 2017
- Headquarters: Oslo, Norway

The Taipei Representative Office in Norway (Chinese: 駐挪威代表處; pinyin: Zhù Nuówēi Dàibiǎo Chù) was established in 1980.

In July 2017, the ROC Ministry of Foreign Affairs announced that the office will be suspended on 30 September 2017 and affairs related to Taiwanese in the country will be handled by Taipei Mission in Sweden. The decision was made to improve the efficiency of the foreign diplomatic missions of Taiwan.

== Taipei representative offices around the world ==
The list below shows the countries or regions where TECROs/TROs are established.

=== G20 nations ===
Country or Region	Office Name	Representative	Website
Argentina	Taipei Economic and Cultural Office in Argentina	Miguel Tsao	
Australia	Taipei Economic and Cultural Office in Australia	Elliott Charng	
Brazil	Taipei Economic and Cultural Office in Brazil	Chang Tsung-che	
Canada	Taipei Economic and Cultural Office in Canada	Winston Chen	
France	Taipei Representative Office in France	Wu Chih-chung	
Germany	Taipei Representative Office in the Federal Republic of Germany	Shieh Jhy-wey	
Indonesia	Taipei Economic and Trade Office, Jakarta, Indonesia	John C. Chen	
India	Taipei Economic and Cultural Center in India	Tien Chung-kwang	
Italy	Ufficio di Rappresentanza di Taipei in Italia	Lee Sing-ying	
Japan	Taipei Economic and Cultural Representative Office in Japan	Frank Hsieh	
Mexico	Taipei Economic and Cultural Office in Mexico	Carlos Liao	
Russia	Representative Office in Moscow for the Taipei-Moscow Economic and Cultural Coordination Commission	Chen Chun-shen	
Saudi Arabia	Taipei Economic and Cultural Representative Office in Saudi Arabia	Lin Jinn-jong	
South Africa	Taipei Liaison Office in the Republic of South Africa	Oliver Liao	
South Korea	Taipei Mission in South Korea	Gow-wei Chiou	
Turkey	Taipei Economic and Cultural Mission in Ankara	James Chen	
United Kingdom	Taipei Representative Office in the United Kingdom	Vincent Yao	
United States	Taipei Economic and Cultural Representative Office in the United States	Alexander Yui	

=== Other countries ===
Country or Region	Office Name	Representative	Website
Austria	Taipei Economic and Culture Office in Austria	Katharine Chang	
Bahrain	Taipei Trade Office in the Kingdom of Bahrain	Michael Chen	
Belgium	Taipei Representative Office in the EU and Belgium	Tung Kuo-yu	
Brunei	Taipei Economic and Cultural Office in Brunei Darussalam	Vanessa Shih	
Chile	Oficina Económica y Cultural de Taipei en Chile	Silvia Liu	
Colombia	Oficina Comercial de Taipei en Bogotá, Colombia	Francisca Y.T.Chang	
Czech Republic	Taipei Economic and Cultural Office, Prague, Czech Republic	Ke Liang-ruey	
Denmark	Taipei Representative Office in Denmark	Lee Shying-jow	
Ecuador	Oficina Comercial de Taipei	Rolando Chuang	
Fiji	Taipei Trade office in Fiji	Paul Chen	
Finland	Taipei Representative Office in Finland	Janet Chang	
Greece	Taipei Representative Office in Greece	Sherman S. Kuo	
Guam	Taipei Economic and Cultural Office in Guam	Paul Yin-Lien Chen	
Hong Kong	Taipei Economic and Cultural Office in Hong Kong	James Chu	
Hungary	Taipei Representative Office in Budapest	Liu Shih-chung	
Ireland	Taipei Representative Office in Ireland	Yang Tzu-pao	
Israel	Taipei Economic and Cultural Office in Tel Aviv	Abby Ya-ping Lee	
Ivory Coast	Taipei Representative Office in Ivory Coast		
Jordan	Taipei Economic and Cultural Office in Jordan	Ismail Mae	
Kuwait	Taipei Commercial Representative Office in the State of Kuwait	Liu Kuo-hsing	
Latvia	Taipei Mission in the Republic of Latvia	Andy Chin	
Lithuania	Taiwanese Representative Office in Lithuania	Constance H. Wang	
Macau	Taipei Economic and Cultural Office in Macau	Lu Chang-shui	
Malaysia	Taipei Economic and Cultural Office in Malaysia	Lo Yu-chung	
Mongolia	Taipei Trade and Economic Representative Office in Ulaanbaatar	Yang Syin-yi	
Myanmar	Taipei Economic and Cultural Office in Myanmar	Zhang Jun	
Netherlands	Taipei Representative Office in the Netherlands	James Lee	
New Zealand	Taipei Economic and Cultural Office in New Zealand	Charng Yii-Lih	
Nigeria	Taipei Trade Office in the Federal Republic of Nigeria	Morgan Chao	
Oman	Taipei Economic and Cultural Office, Muscat, Oman	Liao Kang-min	
Peru	Taipei Economic and Cultural Office in Peru	Francisca Yu-Tsz Chang	
Philippines	Taipei Economic and Cultural Office in the Philippines	Lin Song-huann	
Poland	Taipei Representative Office in Poland	Chen Ming-cheng	
Portugal	Taipei Economic and Cultural Centre in Portugal	Her Jian-gueng	
Singapore	Taipei Representative Office in Singapore	Tung Chen-yuan	
Slovakia	Taipei Representative Office, Bratislava	David Nan-yang Lee	
Somaliland	Taiwan Representative Office in the Republic of Somaliland	Allen C. Lou	
Spain	Taipei Economic and Cultural Office in Spain	José María Liu	
Sweden	Taipei Mission in Sweden	Daniel Liao	
Switzerland	Taipei Cultural and Economic Delegation in Switzerland	Liu Bang-zyh	
Thailand	Taipei Economic and Cultural Office in Thailand	Tung Chen-yuan	
United Arab Emirates	The Commercial Office of Taipei, Dubai, U.A.E.	Samee Chang	
Vietnam	Taipei Economic and Cultural Office in Vietnam	Richard R. C. Shih	

== Former representative offices ==
- Bangladesh — Taipei Economic and Cultural Office in Bangladesh (closed in 2009, transferred to Taipei Economic and Cultural Center in India and in Thailand)
- Belarus — de facto embassy in Minsk (closed in 2006, transferred to Representative Office in Moscow for the Taipei-Moscow Economic and Cultural Coordination Commission)
- Bolivia — Taipei Economic Office in La Paz (closed in 2009, transferred to Taipei Economic and Cultural Office in Peru)
- Cambodia — de facto embassy in Phnom Penh (closed in 1997, transferred later to Taipei Economic and Cultural Office, Ho Chi Minh City)
- Libya — Taiwan Commercial Office in Tripoli (closed in 2011, transferred to Taipei Economic and Cultural Office in Jordan)
- Norway — Taipei Representative Office in Norway (closed in 2017, transferred to Taipei Mission in Sweden)
- Papua New Guinea — Taipei Economic and Cultural Office in Papua New Guinea (closed in 2026)
- Uruguay — Taipei Economic Office in Montevideo (closed in 2002 temporary, transferred to Taipei Economic and Cultural Office in Argentina)
- Venezuela — Taipei Economic Office in Caracas (closed in 2009, transferred to Taipei Commercial Office in Bogotá, Colombia)

== See also ==
- Political status of Taiwan
- Chinese Taipei
- Hong Kong Economic and Trade Office
- Taipei Economic and Cultural Office in Canada
- List of diplomatic missions of Taiwan
- Timeline of diplomatic relations of the Republic of China
