= Miguel Tsao =

Taiwanese diplomat and politician

- 曹立傑
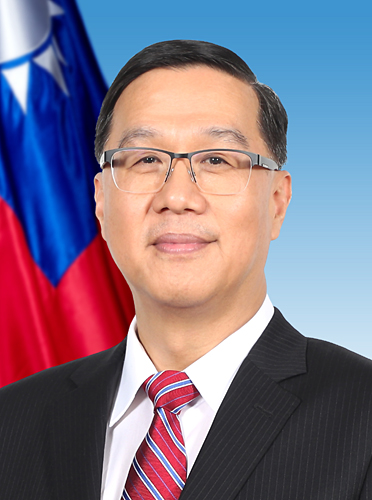
- Official portrait

ROC Representative to Argentina
- In office 25 June 2021 – February 2023
- Succeeded by: Florencia Miao-hung Hsie

Vice Minister of Foreign Affairs of the Republic of China
- In office 29 November 2018 – 22 June 2021
- Minister: Joseph Wu
- Deputy: Kelly Hsieh, Hsu Szu-chien; Tseng Ho-jen, Tien Chung-kwang
- Preceded by: José María Liu
- Succeeded by: Alexander Yui

ROC Representative to Peru
- In office 2017–2018
- Preceded by: Jaime Chin-Mu Wu
- Succeeded by: Iván Yueh-Jung Lee

ROC Ambassador to Panama
- In office 2017–2017
- Preceded by: José María Liu

ROC Ambassador to Saint Kitts and Nevis
- In office 2015–2010

Personal details
- Education: Tamkang University (BA, MA)

Miguel Tsao or Tsao Li-jey (traditional Chinese: 曹立傑; simplified Chinese: 曹立杰; pinyin: Cáo Lìjié) is a Taiwanese diplomat and politician.

== Education ==
Tsao obtained his bachelor's degree in Spanish literature and master's degree in European studies from Tamkang University.

== Careers ==
He was the Vice Minister of Foreign Affairs from 2018 to 2021. On 25 June 2021, he was appointed to be the representative to Argentina.
