= Taipei Mission, Stockholm =

Taipei Mission in Sweden 駐瑞典台北代表團

Agency overview
- Formed: 1981 (as Taipei Trade, Tourism and Information Office); 1994 (as Taipei Mission in Sweden)
- Jurisdiction: Sweden; Norway
- Headquarters: Stockholm, Sweden
- Agency executive: Phoebe Yeh, Representative
- Website: Taipei Mission in Sweden

The Taipei Mission in Sweden (Chinese: 駐瑞典台北代表團; pinyin: Zhù Ruìdiǎn Táiběi Dàibiǎo Tuán) represents the interests of Taiwan in Sweden in the absence of formal diplomatic relations, functioning as a de facto embassy. Its counterpart in Taiwan is the Swedish Trade and Invest Council in Taipei. The office also handles affairs in Norway after the Taipei Representative Office in Norway closed on 30 September 2017.

== History ==
Sweden established official diplomatic relations with the People's Republic of China in 1950, which required the Swedish government to break off relations with the government in Taiwan.

The Taipei Mission was established as the Taipei Trade, Tourism and Information Office in 1981 and renamed to Taipei Mission in Sweden in 1994.

== Organizational structures ==
- Political Division
- Consular Division
- Education Division
- Economic Division

== Representatives ==
- Lee Chen-jan (2014–2016)
- Daniel T.C. Liao (2016–2020)
- Vincent C.H. Yao (2020–2022)
- Klement Ruey-sheng Gu (2022–2025)
- Phoebe Yeh (2026–)

== See also ==
- List of diplomatic missions of Taiwan
- List of diplomatic missions in Sweden
