= Vanessa Shih =

Taiwanese diplomat (born 1962)

- 史亞平
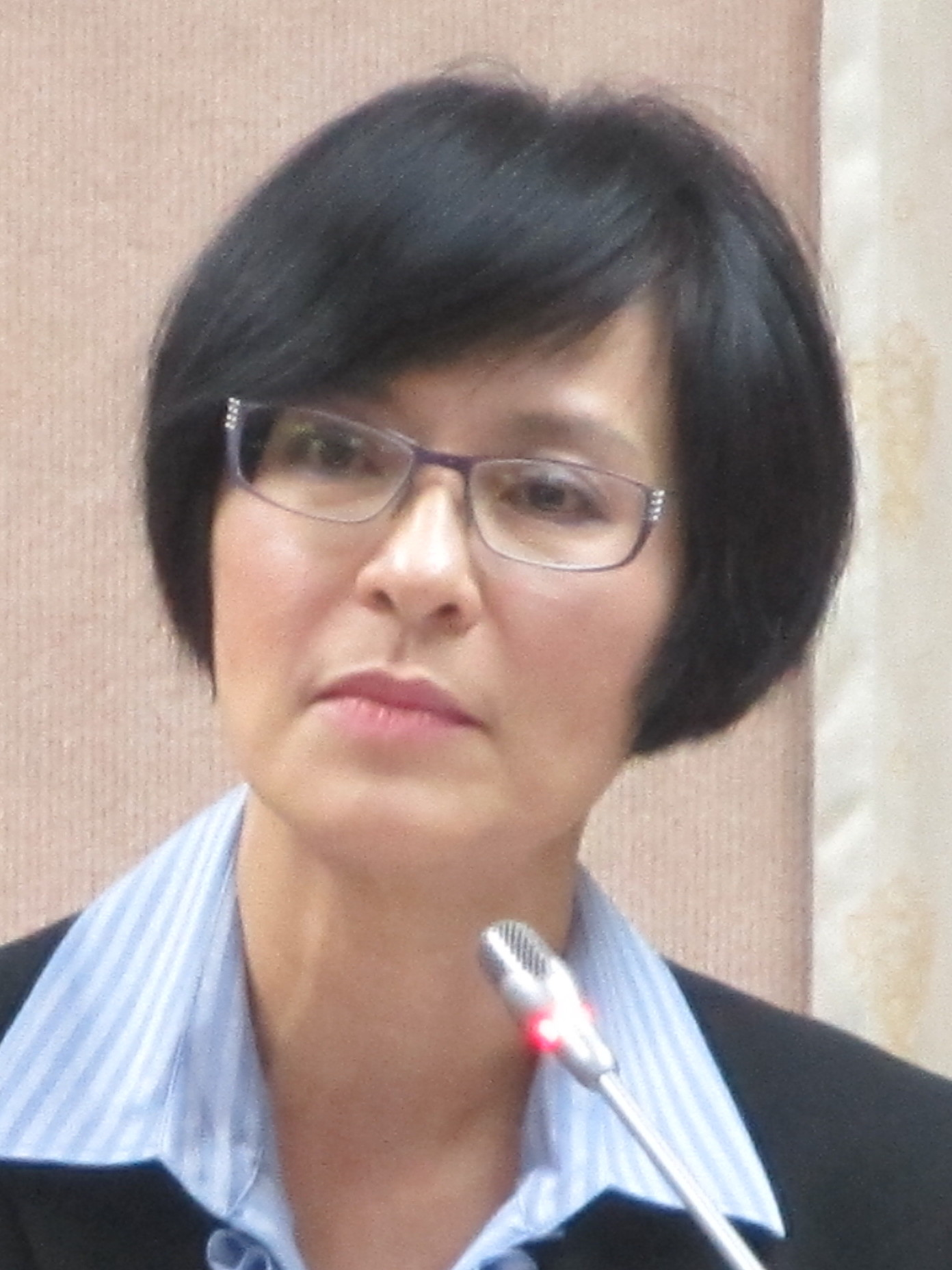

ROC Representative to Brunei
- Incumbent
- Assumed office 2022

ROC Representative to Austria
- In office January 2016 – 2020

Vice Minister of Foreign Affairs of the Republic of China
- In office 25 June 2012 – 18 January 2016
- Minister: David Lin
- Deputy: Simon Ko, Joseph Shih, Andrew Kao
- Succeeded by: Lee Chen-jan

ROC Representative to Singapore
- In office 2009 – May 2012
- Preceded by: Kuo Shih-nan
- Succeeded by: Hsieh Fa-dah

Minister of Government Information Office of the Republic of China
- In office 20 May 2008 – 31 December 2008
- Preceded by: Shieh Jhy-wey
- Succeeded by: Su Jun-pin

ROC Deputy Representative to Australia
- In office 2004–2007
- Representative: Timothy Yang

Personal details
- Born: 27 July 1962 (age 64) Taipei, Taiwan
- Party: Kuomintang
- Education: National Chengchi University (BA, MA)

Vanessa Shih (Chinese: 史亞平; pinyin: Shǐ Yàpíng; born 27 July 1962) is a Taiwanese diplomat who began serving as the representative of the Republic of China to Brunei in 2022. She served as representative to Austria between 2016 and 2020. She previously led the Taipei Representative Office in Singapore from 2009 to 2012, when she was named vice minister of foreign affairs. As vice minister Shih advocated for the United Nations to allow the Republic of China to have participation of some forms within the UN.

== Education ==
Shih obtained her bachelor's degree in diplomacy and master's degree in international law and diplomacy from National Chengchi University.

== Early career ==
Shih began working in the Ministry of Foreign Affairs in 1987, and was a longtime secretary for Ting Mao-shih. She was appointed as the head of the Government Information Office (GIO) in May 2008 and left at the end of the year for Singapore.

== Diplomatic career ==
In October 2011, Shih reportedly angered Singapore's founding father Lee Kwan Yew and other high-ranking officials in the Singaporean government after she sang the ROC national anthem and hung the ROC flag in public, attended by international guests during the 100th anniversary of the National Day of the Republic of China at Shangri-La Hotel Singapore. She was also in contact with Chen Show Mao, a member of the Workers' Party of Singapore which is one of the opposition parties of Singapore. As a result, there were reportedly tensions in relations between Singapore and Taiwan which Shih rebutted. In March 2012, Shih returned to Taiwan.

On 6 July 2012, Shih was sworn in as vice foreign minister, and became the youngest diplomat to ever hold the post.

Shih, along with ROC President Ma Ying-jeou, First Lady Christine Chow Ma, National Security Council Secretary-General Jason Yuan and President of Fu Jen Catholic University Vincent Chiang visited Vatican City on 19 March 2013 to attend the inauguration of the newly elected Pope Francis as the head of Catholic Church.

Before the visit, Shih said that this Vatican City trip by high ranking ROC officials were made without any contact with the Government of China. According to Shih, the ROC government was invited by the Holy See because both governments share the same views on religious freedom, social justice and humanitarianism.

In September 2014, commenting on the invitation given to President Ma Ying-jeou as The Honorable Mr. Ma Ying-jeou and Economic Leader of Chinese Taipei for the upcoming APEC China 2014 in Beijing on 10–11 November 2014, Shih said that the nation had not been downgraded such title because APEC economic leaders' meeting participants are taking parts in their capacity of their countries' economic leaders. She said that the invitation was received at Taipei Guest House by Mainland Affairs Council Minister Wang Yu-chi and other council and ministry officials responsible for handling APEC-related affairs.

Shih was named the ROC Representative to Austria in January 2016, and left the post in 2020. By 2022, Shih had taken office as ROC Representative to Brunei.

== Personal life ==
Shih is married to Hao Jyh-hwa. In March 2024, Hao was sentenced by the Supreme Court to 10 years and 11 months imprisonment for importing and selling unapproved cosmetic injectables.
