= Taipei Trade Office, Lagos =

Taipei Trade Office in the Federal Republic of Nigeria 駐奈及利亞聯邦共和國臺北貿易辦事處
Agency overview
- Formed: 1991 (in Lagos); 2001 (in Abuja); 2018 (in Lagos)
- Jurisdiction: Nigeria; Cameroon; Benin; Djibouti; Ethiopia; Ghana; Gambia; Liberia; Sierra Leone; Burkina Faso; São Tomé and Príncipe; South Sudan; Chad; Sudan; Niger; Equatorial Guinea; Senegal; Togo; Gabon; Guinea; Central African Republic; Republic of Congo; Ivory Coast; Mali; DR Congo; Cape Verde; Guinea-Bissau
- Headquarters: Lagos
- Agency executive: Andy Yih-Ping Liu, Representative
- Website: Taipei Trade Office in the Federal Republic of Nigeria

The Taipei Trade Office in the Federal Republic of Nigeria (Chinese: 駐奈及利亞聯邦共和國臺北貿易辦事處; pinyin: Zhù Nàijílìyǎ Liánbāng Gònghéguó Táiběi Màoyì Bànshì Chù) represents the interests of Taiwan in Nigeria in the absence of formal diplomatic relations, functioning as a de facto embassy.

Its counterpart in Taiwan is the Nigeria Trade Office in Taiwan, R.O.C. in New Taipei.

It also has responsibility for Taiwan's interests in Cameroon, Benin, Ghana, Gambia, Liberia and Sierra Leone. Previously, Taiwan had diplomatic relations with Gambia, and there was an Embassy of the Republic of China in Banjul. However, these were broken off in 2013 by President Yahya Jammeh. Liberia similarly broke off diplomatic relations with Taipei in 2003.

It is headed by a Representative, currently Morgan Chao.

== History ==
The Mission was established in Lagos in 1991, before relocating to Abuja in 2001, despite requests from Beijing that it be located outside the Nigerian capital.

In January 2017, the government of Nigeria requested Taiwan to relocate the office back to Lagos from Abuja. On 8 December 2017, the office began the relocation from Abuja to Lagos and on 5 January 2018, the new office in Lagos was officially opened under the name Taipei Trade Office in the Federal Republic of Nigeria.

== Representatives ==
- Yang Tien-hsing
- Morgan Chao
- Vincent W.S. Yang
- Andy Yih-Ping Liu

== See also ==
- Nigeria–Taiwan relations
- List of diplomatic missions in Nigeria
