= List of diplomatic missions in Nigeria =

This is a list of diplomatic missions in Nigeria. There are 104 embassies/high commissions in Abuja, and many countries maintain their consulates in other Nigerian cities (not including honorary consulates).

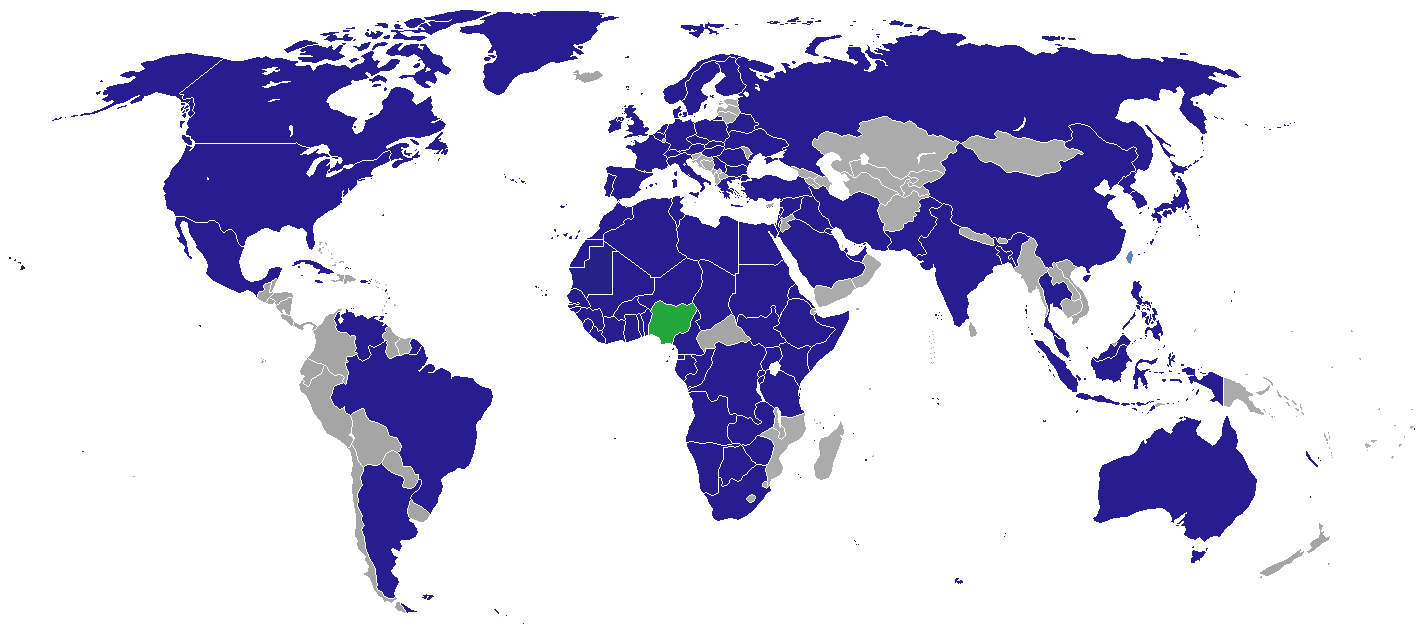
Map of diplomatic missions in Nigeria

== Diplomatic missions in Abuja ==
=== Embassies and High Commissions ===
1. Algeria
2. Angola
3. Argentina
4. Australia
5. Austria
6. Bangladesh
7. Belarus
8. Belgium
9. Benin
10. Botswana
11. Brazil
12. Bulgaria
13. Burkina Faso
14. Burundi
15. Cameroon
16. Canada
17. Cape Verde
18. Chad
19. China
20. Congo-Brazzaville
21. Congo-Kinshasa
22. Cuba
23. Czech Republic
24. Denmark
25. Egypt
26. Equatorial Guinea
27. Eritrea
28. Ethiopia
29. Finland
30. France
31. Gabon
32. Gambia
33. Germany
34. Ghana
35. Greece
36. Guinea
37. Guinea-Bissau
38. Holy See
39. Hungary
40. India
41. Indonesia
42. Iran
43. Iraq
44. Ireland
45. Israel
46. Italy
47. Ivory Coast
48. Jamaica
49. Japan
50. Kenya
51. Kuwait
52. Lebanon
53. Liberia
54. Libya
55. Malaysia
56. Mali
57. Mauritania
58. Mexico
59. Morocco
60. Namibia
61. Netherlands
62. Niger
63. North Korea
64. Norway
65. Pakistan
66. Palestine
67. Philippines
68. Poland
69. Portugal
70. Qatar
71. Romania
72. Russia
73. Rwanda
74. Sahrawi Republic
75. São Tomé and Príncipe
76. Saudi Arabia
77. Senegal
78. Serbia
79. Sierra Leone
80. Slovakia
81. Somalia
82. South Africa
83. South Korea
84. South Sudan
85. Spain
86. Sudan
87. Sweden
88. Switzerland
89. Syria
90. Tanzania
91. Thailand
92. Togo
93. Trinidad and Tobago
94. Tunisia
95. Turkey
96. Uganda
97. Ukraine
98. United Arab Emirates
99. United Kingdom
100. United States
101. Venezuela
102. Vietnam
103. Zambia
104. Zimbabwe

=== Other missions or delegation ===
- European Union (Delegation)

== Gallery ==
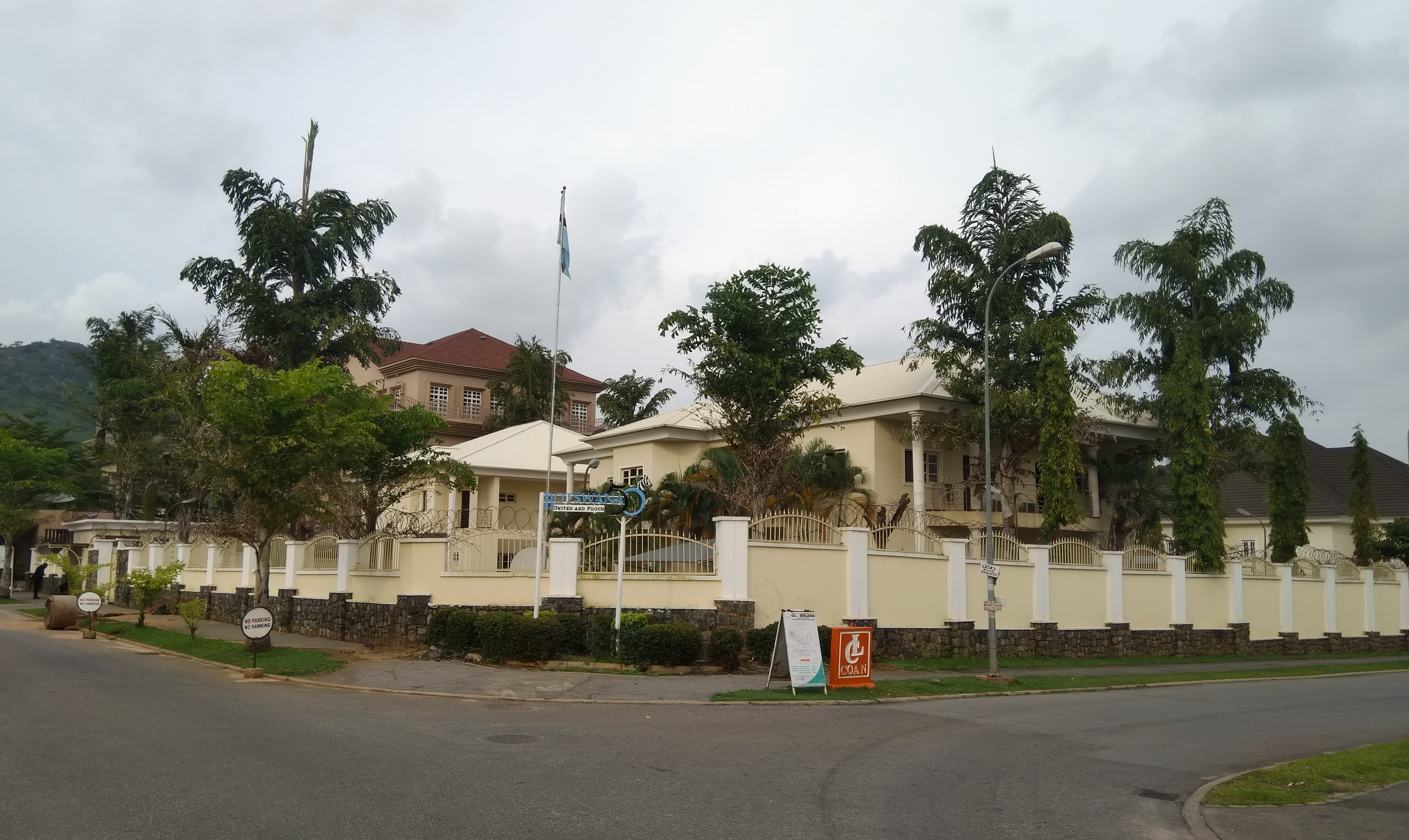
High Commission of Botswana

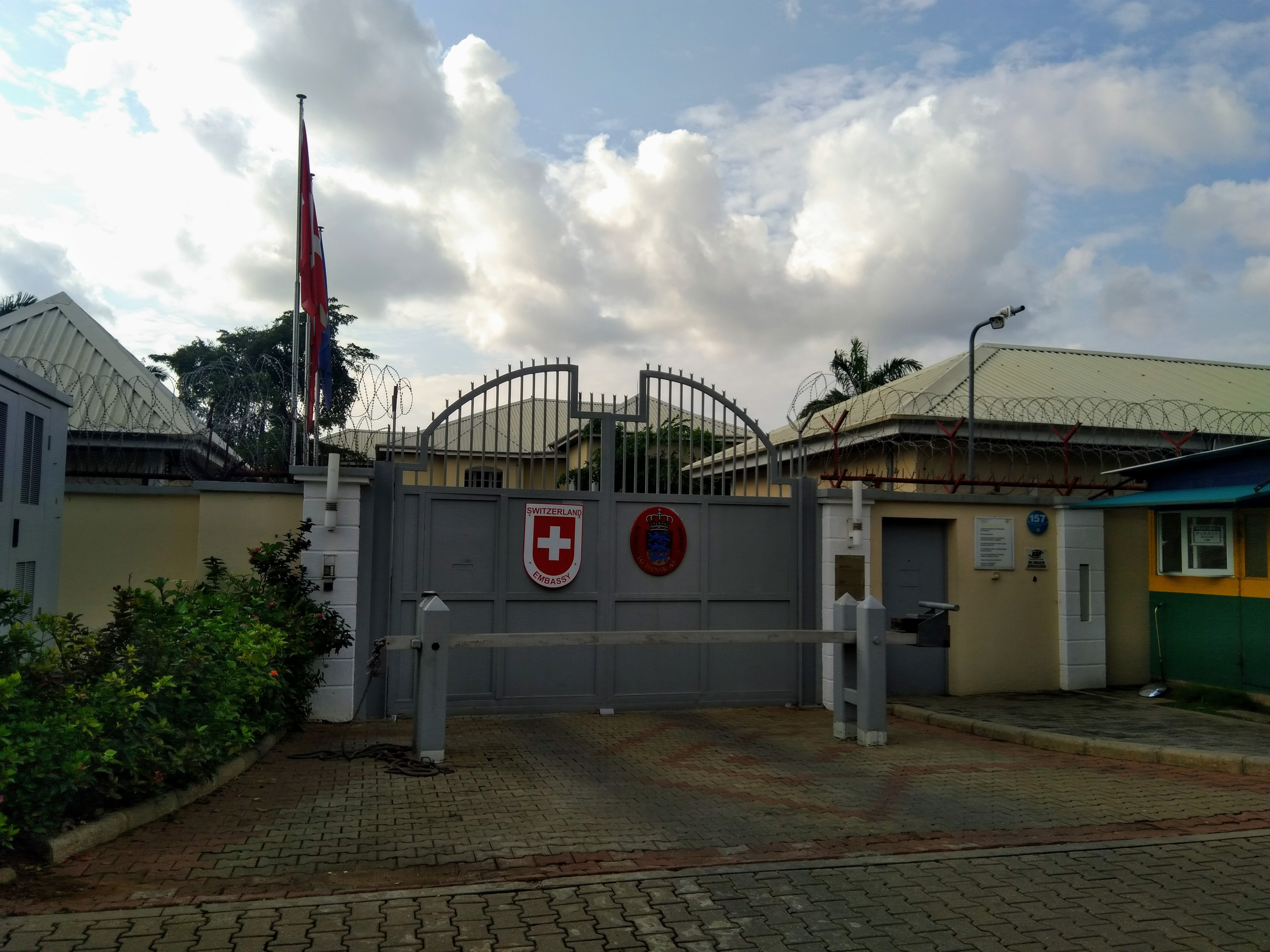
Embassies of Denmark and Switzerland

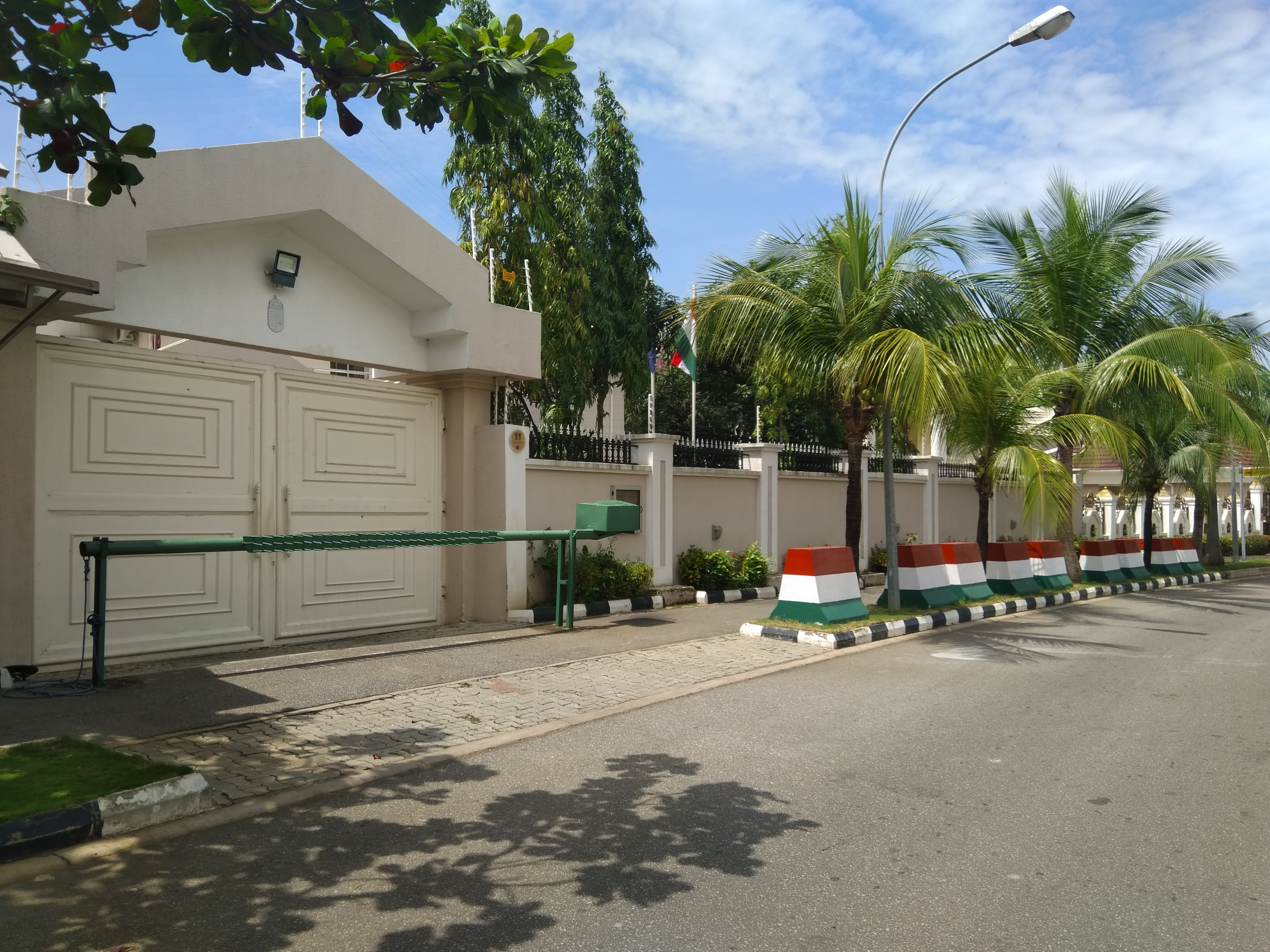
Embassy of Hungary

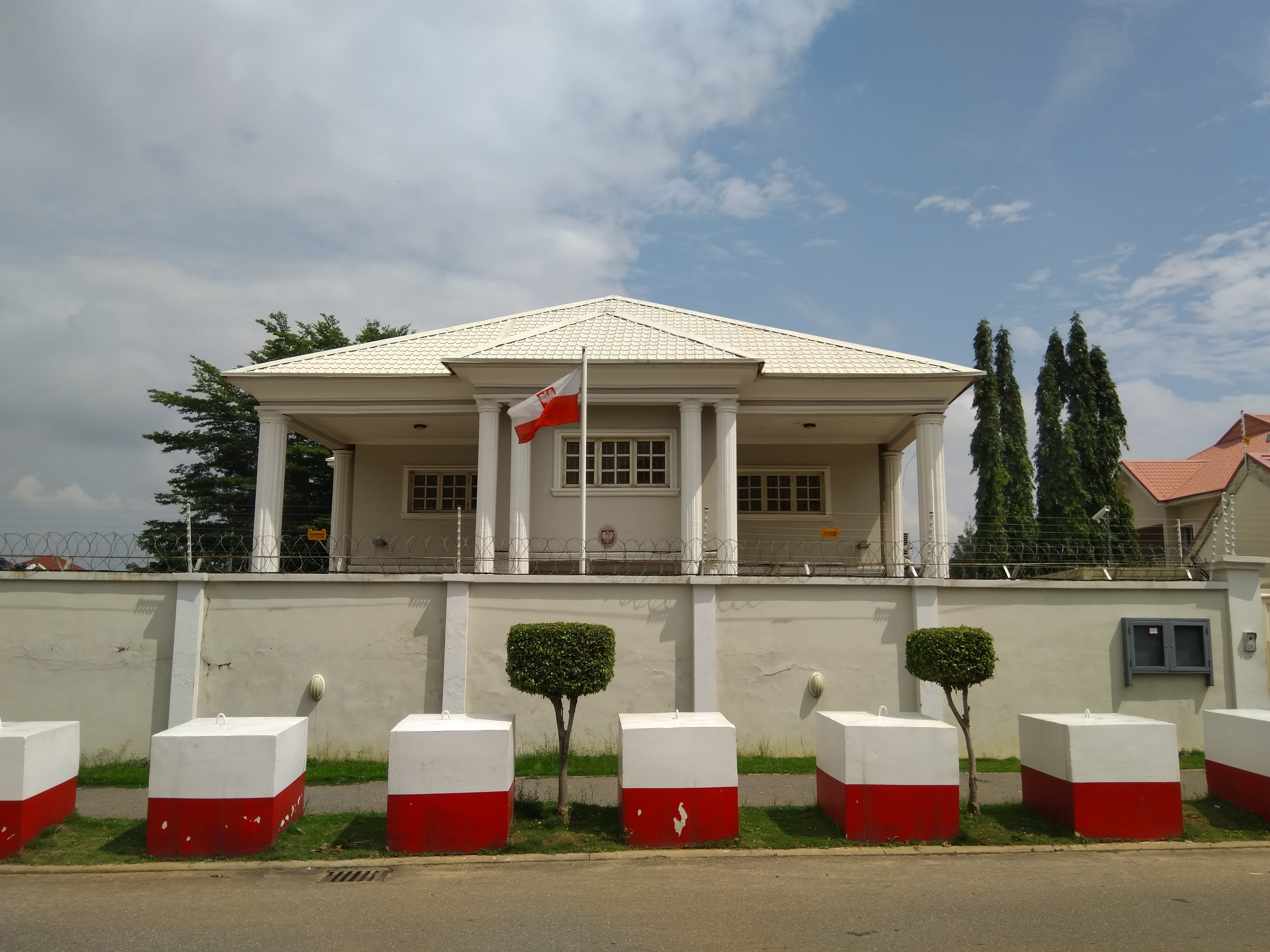
Embassy of Poland

== Consular missions ==
The following major cities are host to career consular missions. Lagos, Nigeria's largest city, hosts the most number of career consulates, owing to its status as national capital until 1991. While all sending countries have relocated their embassies to Abuja since then, a number of them still maintain their chanceries in Lagos as to serve extension offices of their embassies in Abuja.

All are consulates-general unless otherwise indicated.

=== Abuja ===
- Central African Republic (Consulate)

=== Calabar, Cross River State ===
- Cameroon (Consulate-General)
- Equatorial Guinea

=== Kano, Kano State ===
- Niger
- Saudi Arabia

=== Lagos, Lagos State ===
- Benin (Consulate-General)
- Brazil (Consulate-General)
- Burkina Faso (Consulate-General)
- Cameroon (Consulate-General)
- Canada (Deputy High Commission)
- China (Consulate-General)
- Denmark (Consulate-General)
- Equatorial Guinea
- France (Consulate-General)
- Germany (Consulate-General)
- Ghana (Consulate-General)
- Guinea (Consulate)
- India (Consulate-General)
- Italy (Consulate-General)
- Lebanon (Consulate-General)
- Netherlands (Consulate-General)
- South Africa (Consulate-General)
- South Korea (Embassy office)
- Spain (Consulate-General)
- Switzerland (Consulate-General)
- Taiwan (Trade Office)
- United Kingdom (Deputy High Commissinon)
- United States (Consulate-General)

=== Maiduguri, Borno State ===
- Chad

=== Port Harcourt, Rivers State ===
- United Kingdom (Liaison office)

== Non-resident embassies and high commissions ==
- Afghanistan (Cairo)
- Barbados (Accra)
- Bosnia & Herzegovina (Cairo)
- Chile (Accra)
- Croatia (London)
- Eswatini (Addis Ababa)
- Guatemala (London)
- Kazakhstan (Algiers)
- Lesotho (Tripoli)
- Lithuania (Cairo)
- Maldives (Riyadh)
- Malta (Valletta)
- Madagascar (Addis Ababa)
- Malawi (Addis Ababa)
- Mozambique (Addis Ababa)
- New Zealand (Addis Ababa)
- Nicaragua (Ouagadougou)
- Papua New Guinea (New Delhi)
- Paraguay (Rabat)
- Peru (Algiers)
- Seychelles (Addis Ababa)
- Singapore (Pretoria)
- Uruguay (Pretoria)
- Vanuatu (Canberra)

== Closed missions ==
Host city	Sending country	Mission	Year closed	Ref.
Abuja	Central African Republic	Embassy	Unknown	
Abuja	Ecuador	Embassy	2019	
Abuja	Mozambique	Embassy (Note: Resident in Addis Ababa, Ethiopia)	2002	
Calabar	Republic of China (Taiwan)	Consulate	1997	
Kaduna	United Kingdom	Liaison office	Unknown	
Kaduna	United States	Consulate	1994	
Kano	Polish People's Republic	Consulate	1988	
Kano	United Kingdom	Liaison Office	2014	
Lagos	Australia	Embassy branch office	2009	
Lagos	Austria	Consulate	2013	
Lagos	Belgium	Embassy branch office	2004	
Lagos	Chile	Embassy (Note: Resident in Accra, Ghana)	1983	
Lagos	Egypt	Consulate-General	2015	
Lagos	Ethiopia	Consulate-General	2021	
Lagos	Japan	Embassy branch office	2007	
Lagos	Poland	Consulate General	2008	
Lagos	Sweden	Consulate General	2012	
Lagos	Uruguay	Embassy (Note: Resident in Pretoria, South Africa)	1985	

== Missions to open ==
Host city	Sending country	Mission	Ref.
Abuja	Antigua and Barbuda	High Commission	
Abuja	Colombia	Embassy	

== See also ==
- Foreign relations of Nigeria
