= Institute of Diplomacy and International Affairs =

Affiliated agency of the Ministry of Foreign Affairs of the Republic of China

Coordinates: 3.133471°N 101.702939°E

- 外交部外交及國際事務學院
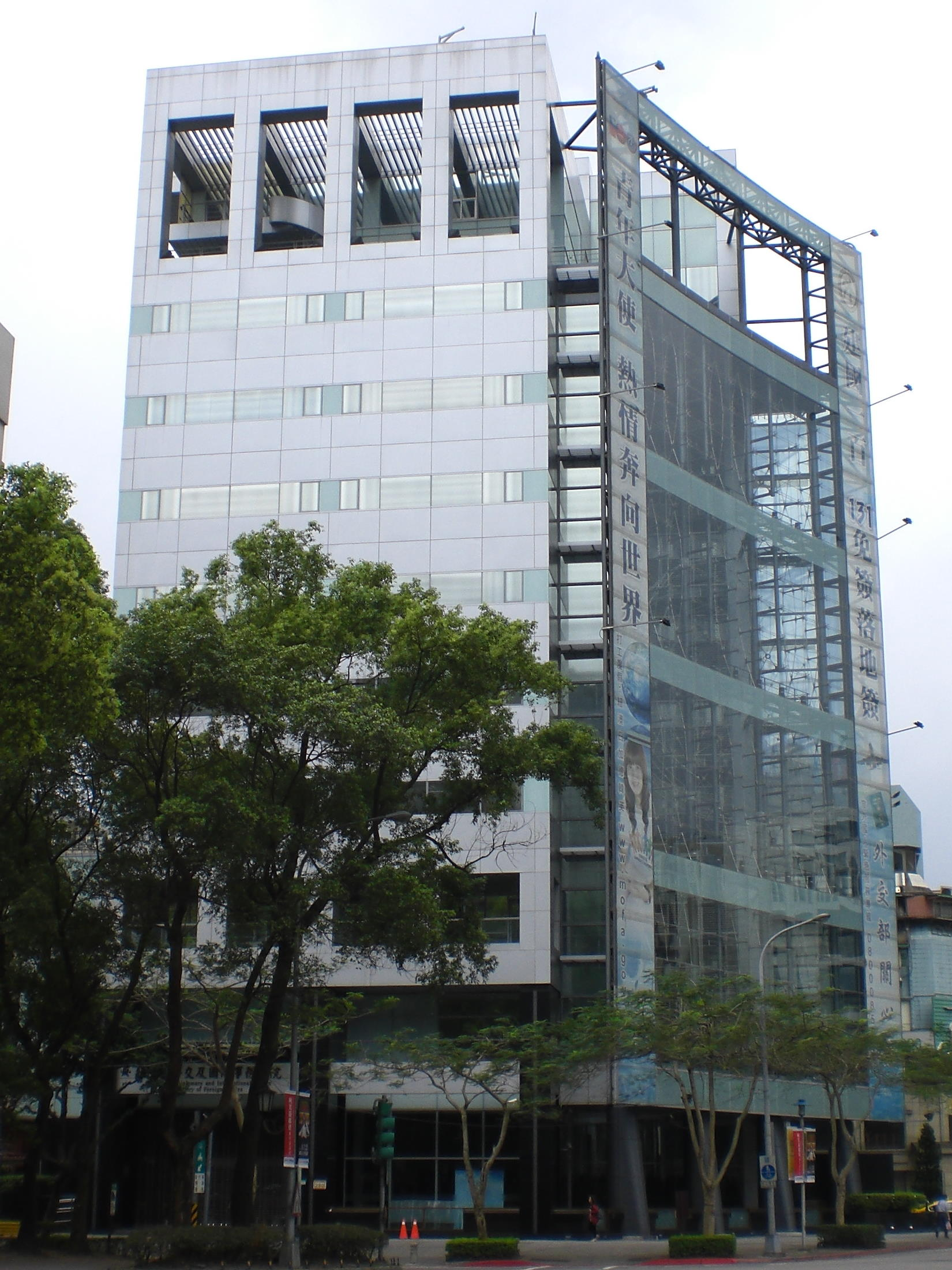

Agency overview
- Formed: 1 September 2012
- Headquarters: Da'an, Taipei, Taiwan
- Agency executives: Tien Chung-kwang, Chancellor; Andrea Sing-Ying Lee, President
- Parent agency: Ministry of Foreign Affairs
- Website: www.mofa.gov.tw/enidia

The Institute of Diplomacy and International Affairs (abbreviated IDIA; Chinese: 外交部外交及國際事務學院; pinyin: Wàijiāobù Wàijiāojí Guójì Shìwù Xuéyuàn) is an affiliated agency of the Ministry of Foreign Affairs of the Republic of China (Taiwan). It is responsible for providing professional training to newly recruited and mid-career diplomats and engaging in academic exchanges with other foreign service institutes and policy research institutions. The IDIA is located in Da'an District, Taipei.

The IDIA is led by its chancellor and managed by its president and chief secretary. The incumbent chancellor is Deputy Minister of Foreign Affairs Tien Chung-kwang.

== History ==
The IDIA was originally established in January 1969 as Foreign Service Training Institute and renamed to Foreign Service Institute in 1971. In March 2004, the Executive Yuan gave approval for the establishment of the Institute of Diplomacy and International Affairs, and IDIA was inaugurated on 1 September 2012.

== Organizational structure ==
- Division of Training and Planning
- Division of Research and International Exchanges
- Secretariat
- Accounting Officer

== See also ==
- Ministry of Foreign Affairs (Taiwan)
