= Spanish Chamber of Commerce in Taiwan =

Spanish Chamber of Commerce in Taiwan Cámara de Comercio de España en Taiwán
- 西班牙商務辦事處

Agency overview
- Formed: 1974 (as Centro de Cervantes)
- Jurisdiction: Republic of China (Taiwan)
- Headquarters: Taipei, Taiwan
- Agency executive: Germán Bejarano García, Director General
- Website: Cámara de Comercio Española en Taipéi

The Spanish Chamber of Commerce in Taiwan (Spanish: Cámara de Comercio de España en Taiwán; Chinese: 西班牙商務辦事處; pinyin: Xībānyá Shāngwù Bànshì Chù) represents the interests of Spain in Taiwan in the absence of formal diplomatic relations, functioning as a de facto embassy. Its counterpart in Spain is the Taipei Economic and Cultural Office in Spain in Madrid.

It also has a Consular Section, which is under the jurisdiction of the Spanish Consulate General in Manila in the Philippines.

The Chamber is headed by the Director General, Germán Bejarano García.

== History ==
The organisation was first established in 1974, as the Centro de Cervantes. Previously, Spain recognised Taiwan as the Republic of China, and was represented by an embassy in Taipei. There were close relations between the governments of Francisco Franco and Chiang Kai-shek, both of which were anti-communist. However, diplomatic relations were severed in 1973 when Spain recognised the People's Republic of China, leading to the establishment of the organisation, under the supervision of the Spanish Federation of Industry and Commerce.

== See also ==
- List of diplomatic missions in Taiwan
- List of diplomatic missions of Spain
