= Representative Office in Moscow for the Taipei-Moscow Economic and Cultural Coordination Commission =

De facto embassy of Taiwan in Russia

Representative Office in Moscow for the Taipei-Moscow Economic and Cultural Coordination Commission 臺北莫斯科經濟文化協調委員會駐莫斯科代表處
- Представительство в Москве Тайбэйско-Московской координационной комиссии по экономическому и культурному сотрудничеству

Agency overview
- Formed: 12 July 1993
- Jurisdiction: Russia; Armenia; Azerbaijan; Belarus; Georgia; Kazakhstan; Kyrgyzstan; Moldova; Tajikistan; Turkmenistan; Ukraine (until 2022); Uzbekistan
- Headquarters: Moscow
- Agency executive: Grace Chin-ru LO, Representative
- Website: Representative Office in Moscow for the Taipei-Moscow Economic and Cultural Coordination Commission

The Representative Office in Moscow for the Taipei-Moscow Economic and Cultural Coordination Commission represents the interests of Taiwan in Russia, functioning as a de facto embassy in the absence of diplomatic relations.

It is responsible for promoting bilateral relations between Taiwan and Russia, as well as handling consular-related business such as passports, visas, and document certification, as well as providing services for expatriates and emergency assistance for foreigners traveling abroad. Its functions are equivalent to embassies of countries with diplomatic relations. The representative office set up an administrative group, a consular affairs group, an economic group, an education group, a cultural group, and a scientific and technological group to be responsible for related affairs. The consular jurisdiction is Russia, which also governs Armenia, Azerbaijan, Belarus, Georgia, Kazakhstan, Kyrgyzstan, Moldova, Tajikistan, Turkmenistan, Ukraine (until 2022) and Uzbekistan.

== History ==
On 12 July 1993, the Representative Office in Moscow for the Taipei-Moscow Economic and Cultural Coordination Commission was established in Moscow with the function of an embassy. On 11 April 1994, the temporary office of Moscow City Hotel was moved to a new location.

On 24 February 2022, after the outbreak of the Russian invasion of Ukraine, the affairs related to Ukraine were transferred to the Taipei Representative Office in Poland. On 10 June, the representative office was relocated from 24/2 Tverskaya St., Korpus 1, Gate 4, 4th floor to the current location at 25 Yermolayevsky Pereulok, 5th Floor. Eleven days later, the Ministry of Foreign Affairs stated that there were many reasons for whether it was related to the Russian-Ukrainian War, including factors such as space or rent, and the relocation could not be completed in a short period of time without political intervention.

== See also ==
- Russia–Taiwan relations
