= Taipei Economic and Cultural Office, Madrid =

(Taiwan) Taipei Economic and Cultural Office, Madrid 駐西班牙台北經濟文化辦事處
- Oficina Económica y Cultural de Taipei en España

Agency overview
- Formed: 1973 (as Centro Sun Yat-sen)
- Jurisdiction: Spain; Equatorial Guinea
- Headquarters: Madrid, Spain
- Agency executive: Li-Cheng Cheng, Representative
- Website: Oficina Económica y Cultural de Taipei en España

The Taipei Economic and Cultural Office in Spain; (Chinese: 駐西班牙台北經濟文化辦事處) (Spanish: Oficina Económica y Cultural de Taipei en España) represents the interests of Taiwan in Spain in the absence of formal diplomatic relations, functioning as a de facto embassy. Its counterpart in Taiwan is the Spanish Chamber of Commerce in Taiwan.

== History ==
The office was established as the Centre Sun Yat-sen in 1973. Previously, Spain recognised Taiwan as the Republic of China, which was represented by an embassy in Madrid. There were close relations between the governments of Francisco Franco and Chiang Kai-shek, both of which were anti-communist. However, diplomatic relations were severed in 1973 when Spain recognised the People's Republic of China.

== Representatives ==
- Hou Ching-shan (2010–2015)
- Simon Ko (2016–2018)
- José María Liu (2018–2023)
- Viva Chang (2023-2024)
- Li-Cheng Cheng (2026-)

== See also ==
- List of diplomatic missions of Taiwan
- List of diplomatic missions in Spain
