= Argentina Trade and Cultural Office, Taipei =

Argentina Trade and Cultural Office in Taiwan Oficina de Representación Comercial y Cultural de la República Argentina en Taiwan
- 阿根廷商務文化辦事處
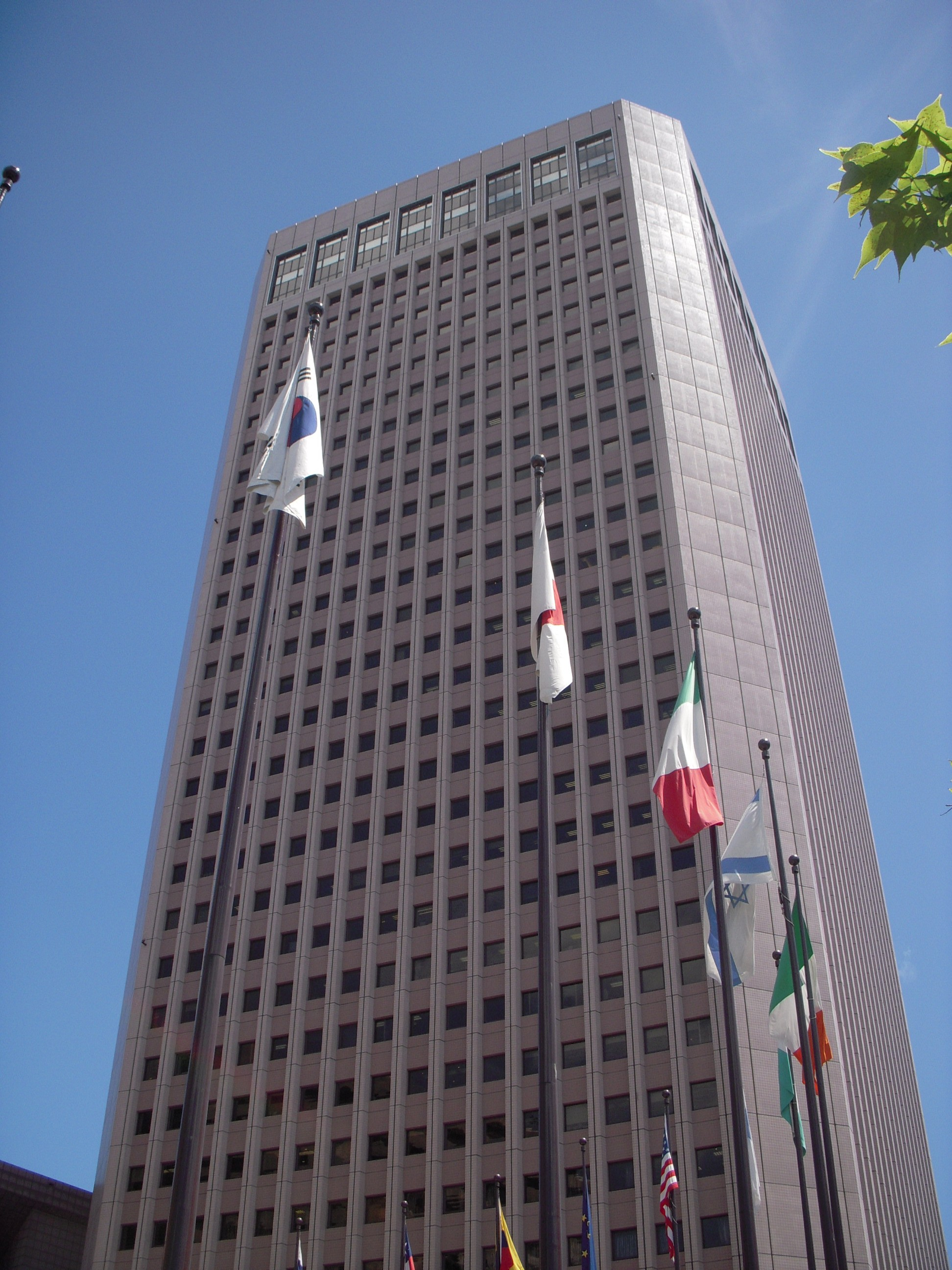
- TWTC International Trade Building where the Argentine Office is located.

Agency overview
- Formed: July 1992
- Jurisdiction: Republic of China
- Headquarters: Taipei, Taiwan
- Agency executive: Carlos Alberto Hernández, Director
- Website: https://occat.cancilleria.gob.ar/

The Argentina Trade and Cultural Office in Taiwan (Spanish: Oficina de Representación Comercial y Cultural de la República Argentina en Taiwan; Chinese: 阿根廷商務文化辦事處; pinyin: Āgēntíng Shāngwù Wénhuà Bànshì Chù) represents the interests of Argentina in Taiwan in the absence of formal diplomatic relations. It has functioned as a de facto embassy since its establishment in July 1992.

Its counterpart in Argentina is the Taipei Economic and Cultural Office in Argentina in Buenos Aires.

== See also ==
- List of diplomatic missions in Taiwan
- List of diplomatic missions of Argentina
