= Ministry of Foreign Affairs (Taiwan) =

Taiwanese ministry in charge of foreign affairs

- 外交部; Wàijiāobù (Mandarin); Gōa-kau-pō͘ (Taiwanese)
- Seal of the Ministry of Foreign Affairs (外交部印)

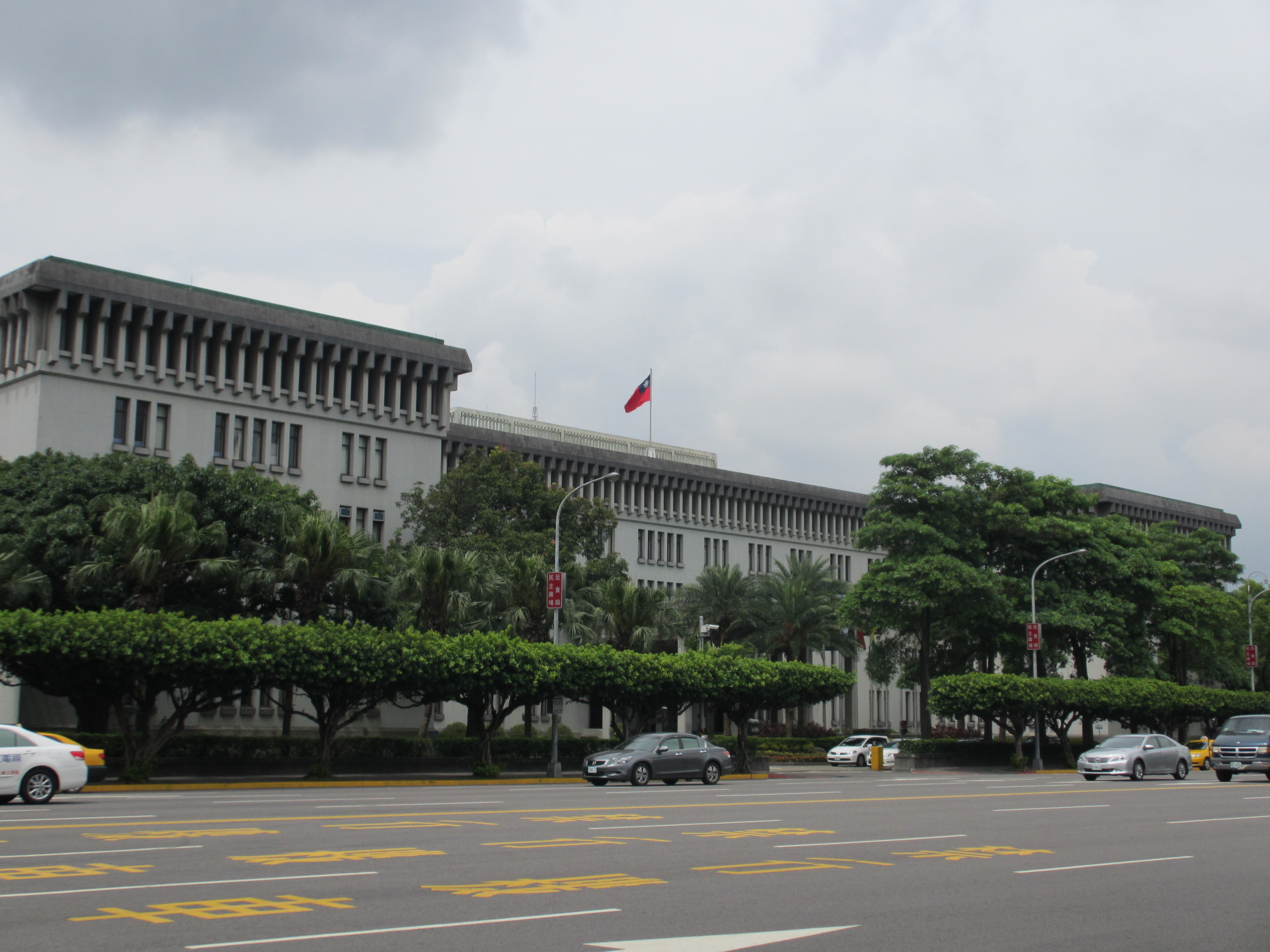

Agency overview
- Formed: March 11, 1861 (Zongli Yamen); January 1, 1912 (Ministry of Foreign Affairs)
- Jurisdiction: Taiwan
- Headquarters: Zhongzheng District, Taipei; 25°2′20.2″N 121°30′58.78″E
- Employees: About 2,000
- Annual budget: About $30 billion NTD
- Minister responsible: Lin Chia-lung, Minister
- Deputy Ministers responsible: Wu Chih-chung (Deputy Minister); Chen Ming-chi (Deputy Minister); Remus Chen (Vice Minister)
- Agency executive: Daniel Tang, Secretary-General
- Parent agency: Executive Yuan
- Website: en.mofa.gov.tw

The Ministry of Foreign Affairs (MOFA; Chinese: 外交部; pinyin: Wàijiāobù; Pe̍h-ōe-jī: Gōa-kau-pō͘) is a cabinet-level ministry of Taiwan, officially the Republic of China (ROC), and is responsible for the ROC's diplomacy and foreign relations. It is headquartered in the capital Taipei. The incumbent minister is Lin Chia-lung, who took office in 2024 and is a member of the Democratic Progressive Party.

Article 141 of the ROC Constitution provides: "The foreign policy of the Republic of China shall, in a spirit of independence and initiative and on the basis of the principles of equality and reciprocity, cultivate good neighborliness with other nations, and respect treaties and the Charter of the United Nations, in order to protect the rights and interests of overseas compatriots, promote international cooperation, advance international justice and ensure world peace." In accordance with the Constitution, MOFA is committed to defending ROC sovereignty and national interests, implementing foreign policy that enhances Taiwan's prosperity and international status.

The Ministry is in charge of maintaining relations with foreign countries excluding the People's Republic of China, which falls under the jurisdiction of the Mainland Affairs Council. As of July 2024, the ROC has official diplomatic relations with 11 UN member states and the Holy See. Due to the One China policy, the ROC also maintains more than 110 diplomatic missions in the form of 13 embassies, a consulate-general, more than 90 semi-official representative offices, and a permanent mission to the World Trade Organization.

== Administration ==
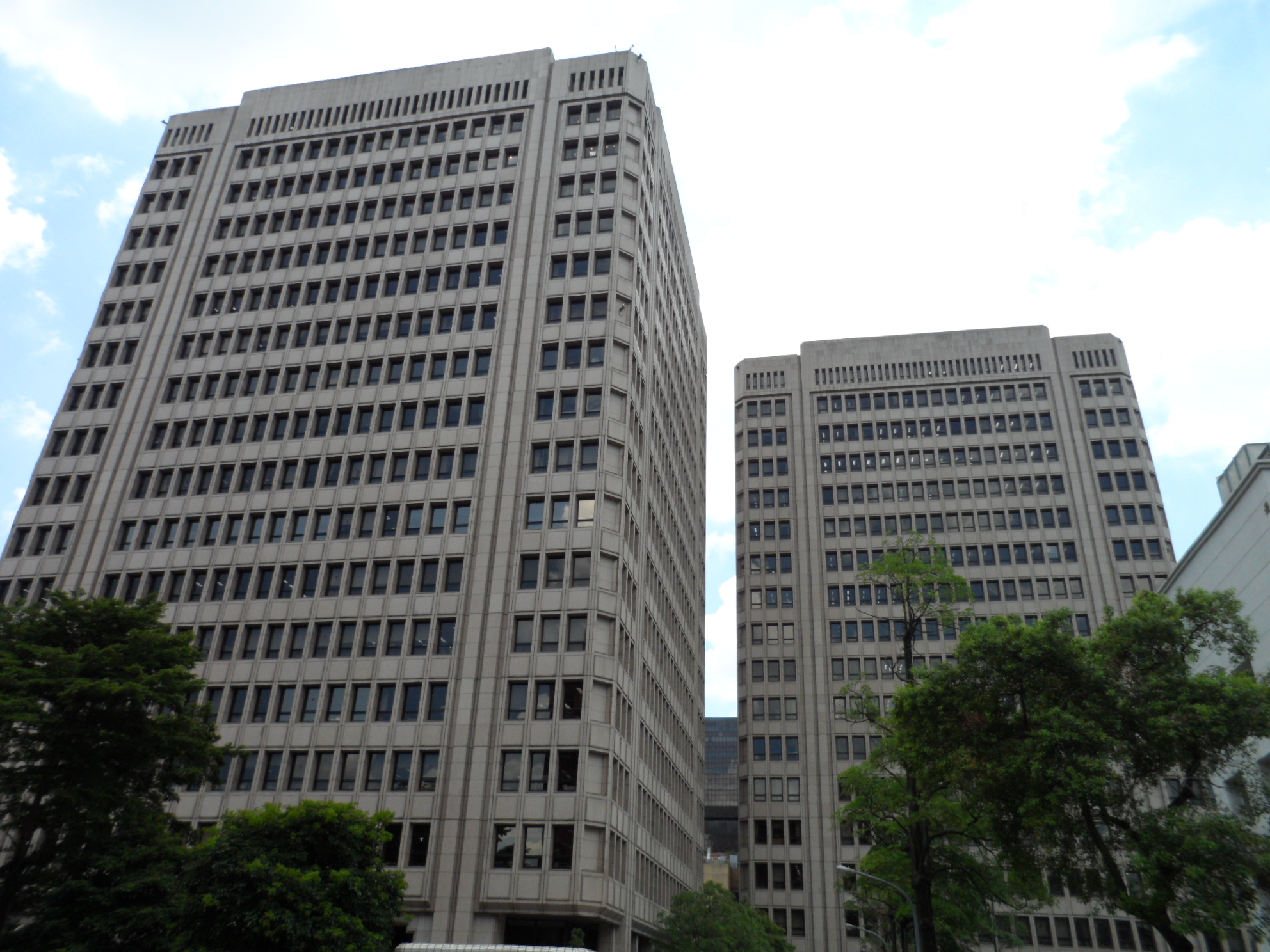
Bureau of Consular Affairs

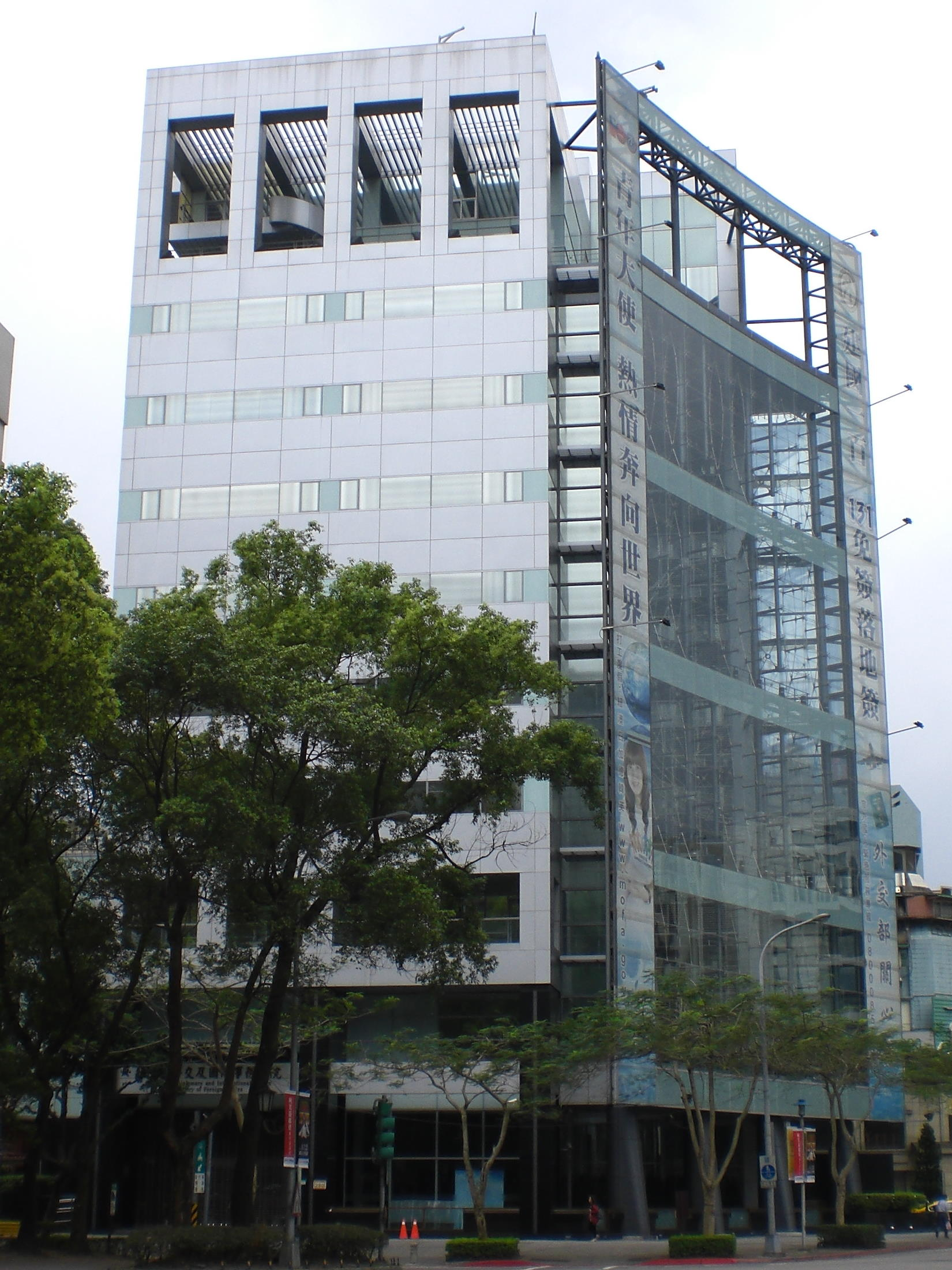
Institute of Diplomacy and International Affairs

MOFA is composed of the following departmental structures:

=== Departmental Structure ===
- Secretariat
- Department of East Asian and Pacific Affairs
- Department of West Asian and African Affairs
- Department of European Affairs
- Department of North American Affairs
- Department of Latin American and Caribbean Affairs
- Department of Treaty and Legal Affairs
- Department of International Organizations
- Department of International Cooperation and Economic Affairs
- Department of International Information Services
- Department of Policy Planning
- Department of Protocol
- Department of General Affairs
- Department of Personnel
- Department of Civil Service Ethics
- Department of Accounting
- Department of Archives, Information Management and Telecommunications
- Public Diplomacy Coordination Council
- Department of NGO International Affairs
- The Office of Parliamentarian Affairs
- Bureau of Consular Affairs
- Institute of Diplomacy and International Affairs
- Taiwan–Japan Relations Association
- Taiwan Council for U.S. Affairs
- Central Taiwan Office
- Southern Taiwan Office
- Eastern Taiwan Office
- Southwestern Taiwan Office

== Budget ==
According to statistics published by the Directorate-General of Budget, Accounting and Statistics for Fiscal Year 2011, the budget for MOFA is equivalent to approx. 10.37% of the budget for the Ministry of National Defense (MND). The MND budget for 2011 has been announced to be US$9.2 billion. Hence, an estimated MOFA budget figure for Fiscal Year 2011 is US$954 million.

== Representative offices abroad ==
For countries with which Taiwan does not have formal diplomatic relations, representation is often referred to as the Taipei Economic and Cultural Representatives Office, Taipei Economic and Cultural Office or Taipei Representative Office, which serve the same function as embassy or consulate.

The Taiwanese Representative Office in Lithuania was formed in 2021, and it was the first representative office in Eastern Europe to bear a name that includes the word "Taiwan".

== Access ==
The MOFA building is accessible by NTU Hospital Station of the Taipei Metro on the Red Line.

== See also ==
- Minister of Foreign Affairs (Republic of China)
- Foreign relations of the Republic of China
