= Taiwanese Vietnamese =

Taiwanese Vietnamese or Vietnamese Taiwanese may be:

- Taiwan–Vietnam relations
- Taiwanese expatriates in Vietnam
- Vietnamese people in Taiwan
- Mixed race people of Taiwanese and Vietnamese descent
- People with dual citizenship of the Republic of China (Taiwan) and Vietnam
