= Canada–Vietnam relations =

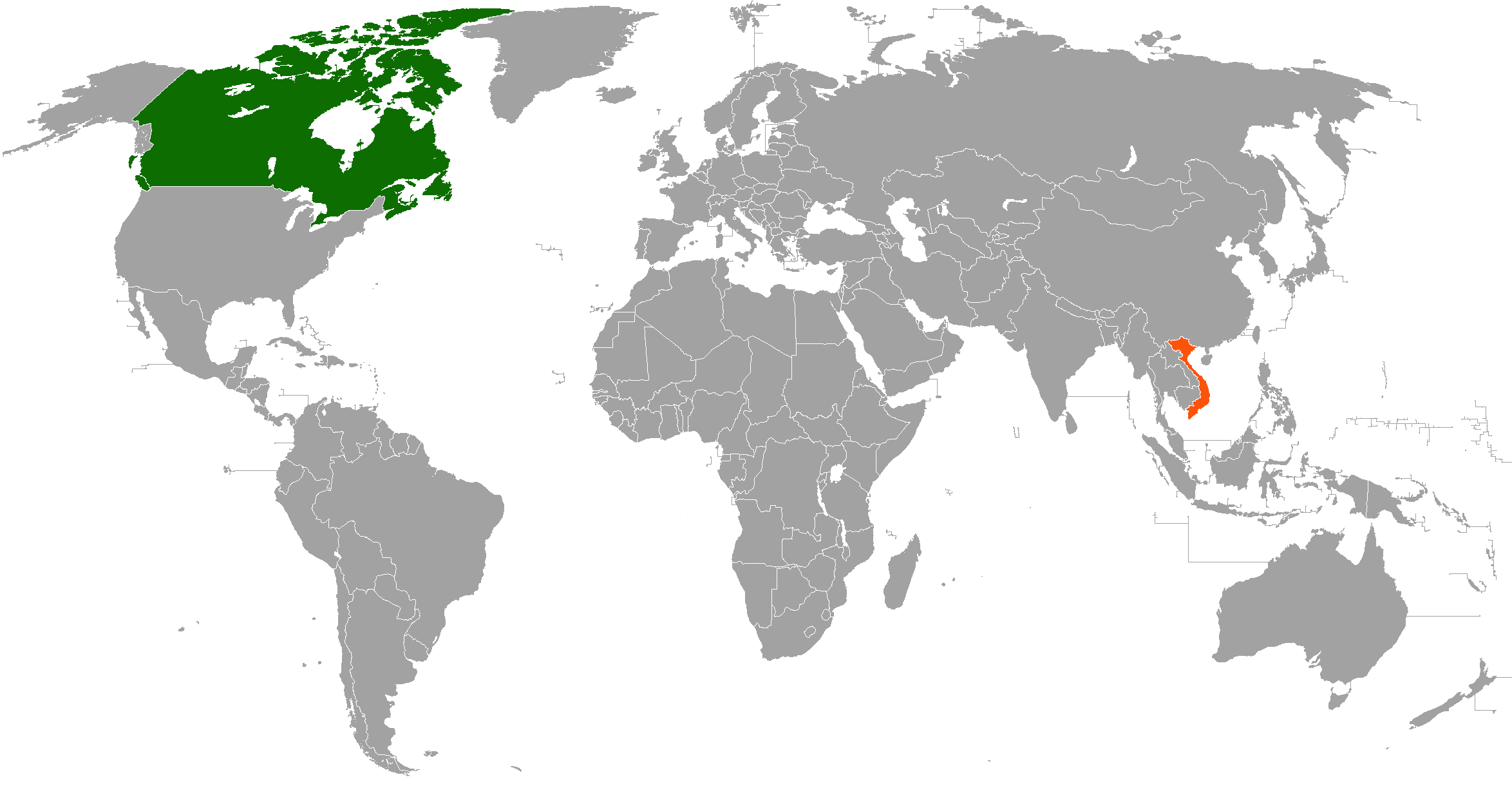

- Canada: Vietnam

Canada and Vietnam have maintained bilateral relations since 1973. Both nations are members of the Asia-Pacific Economic Cooperation, Organisation internationale de la Francophonie and the United Nations.

== History ==
Canada and Vietnam share a common history in the fact that both nations were part of the French colonial empire. During the Vietnam War, Canada remained officially neutral, though there had been mutual assistance periodically. However, with regards to Vietnam, itself, Canada was a member of the International Control Commission overseeing the implementation of the 1954 Geneva Agreements, and provided peacekeepers in Vietnam. Casualties were suffered along the way. After the Fall of Saigon, from 1979 to 1980 Canada admitted 60,000 refugees from Vietnam.

In 1950, Canada recognized the State of Vietnam, which later became South Vietnam. In 1973, Canada and North Vietnam established diplomatic relations. In September 1976, Vietnam opened an embassy in Ottawa, however, the embassy was closed in 1981. Vietnam reopened its embassy in Ottawa in 1990. In 1994, Canada opened a resident embassy in Hanoi.

In November 1994, Canadian Prime Minister, Jean Chrétien, paid an official visit to Vietnam, the first Canadian head of government to do so. In June 2005, Prime Minister Phan Văn Khải became the first Vietnamese head of government to visit Canada. Since the initial visits, there have been several high-level visits between leaders and foreign ministers of both nations. Recent visits include Canadian Prime Minister Justin Trudeau attending the 29th APEC Summit in Hanoi in November 2017. In June 2018, Prime Minister Nguyễn Xuân Phúc visited Canada to attend the 44th G7 summit in La Malbaie.

In 2018, both nations celebrated 45 years of diplomatic relations. In September 2026, Vietnamese President Tô Lâm paid a State visit to Canada and met with Prime Minister Mark Carney. During the visit, President Lâm addressed Parliament and announced that it upgraded their relationship with Canada to "strategic partner".

== High-level visits ==
High-level visits from Canada to Vietnam

- Prime Minister Jean Chrétien (1994, 1997)
- Foreign Minister André Ouellet (1995)
- Foreign Minister John Manley (2001)
- Prime Minister Stephen Harper (2006)
- Foreign Minister Lawrence Cannon (2010)
- Governor General David Johnston (2011)
- Foreign Minister John Baird (2013)
- Foreign Minister Stéphane Dion (2016)
- Prime Minister Justin Trudeau (2017)

High-level visits from Vietnam to Canada

- Deputy Prime Minister Phan Văn Khải (1994)
- Foreign Minister Nguyen Manh Cam (1998)
- Prime Minister Phan Văn Khải (2005)
- Deputy Prime Minister Truong Vinh Trong (2007)
- Vice President Nguyễn Thị Doan (2008)
- Foreign Minister Phạm Gia Khiêm (2009)
- Prime Minister Nguyễn Tấn Dũng (2010)
- Foreign Minister Phạm Bình Minh (2014)
- Prime Minister Nguyễn Xuân Phúc (2018)
- President Tô Lâm (2026)

== Bilateral agreements ==
Both nations have signed several agreements such as an Agreement on Economic and Technological Cooperation between Vietnam and Quebec (1992); Agreement on Development Cooperation (1994); Agreement on Trade and Commerce (1995); Agreement on the Avoidance of Double Taxation and the Prevention of Fiscal Evasion with Respect to Taxes on Income (1997); Memorandum of Understanding on Service and Infrastructure Development (2000); Memorandum of Understanding on Project of Assistance Policy (2001); Agreement on Aviation Transportation (2004); and an Agreement on Adoption (2005).

== Trade ==
In 2018, Canada and Vietnam signed the Comprehensive and Progressive Agreement for Trans-Pacific Partnership (CPTPP), along with other nations along the Pacific Rim. In 2025, two-way trade between both nations totaled US$20.6 billion. Vietnam has been Canada's largest trading partner in the ASEAN region since 2015. The priority areas in Vietnam for Canadian commercial interests are agriculture and agri-food, education, information and communication technologies, clean technology, infrastructure, and aerospace. As of 2026, Canada continues to support Vietnam's sustainability goals through the Advancing Growth, Innovation, and Leadership for Enterprises (AGILE) project.

While Vietnam serves as the CPTPP chair for the first half of 2026, both countries have focused on deepening trade. Bilateral trade reached $8.6 billion in 2025, an 18.8% increase from the previous year. Vietnam remains Canada's largest trading partner within ASEAN. Vietnamese trade minister Lê Mạnh Hùng and Canadian ambassador Jim Nickel agreed to finalize negotiations for the ASEAN–Canada Free Trade Agreement by the end of 2026.

== Resident diplomatic missions ==
of Canada in Vietnam

- Hanoi (Embassy)
- Ho Chi Minh City (Consulate-General)

of Vietnam in Canada

- Ottawa (Embassy)
- Vancouver (Consulate-General)

== See also ==
- Vietnamese Canadians
- Foreign relations of Canada
- Foreign relations of Vietnam
