= Audri Mukhopadhyay =

Canadian diplomat and economist

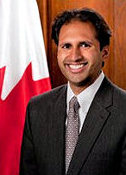
- Canadian Consul General Audri Mukhopadhyay

5th Consul General of Canada in Ho Chi Minh City
- In office August 2009 – August 2013
- Preceded by: Bill Johnston

Personal details
- Born: 1974 (age 51–52) Providence, Rhode Island
- Education: Dalhousie University, Oxford University
- Profession: Diplomat, Economist

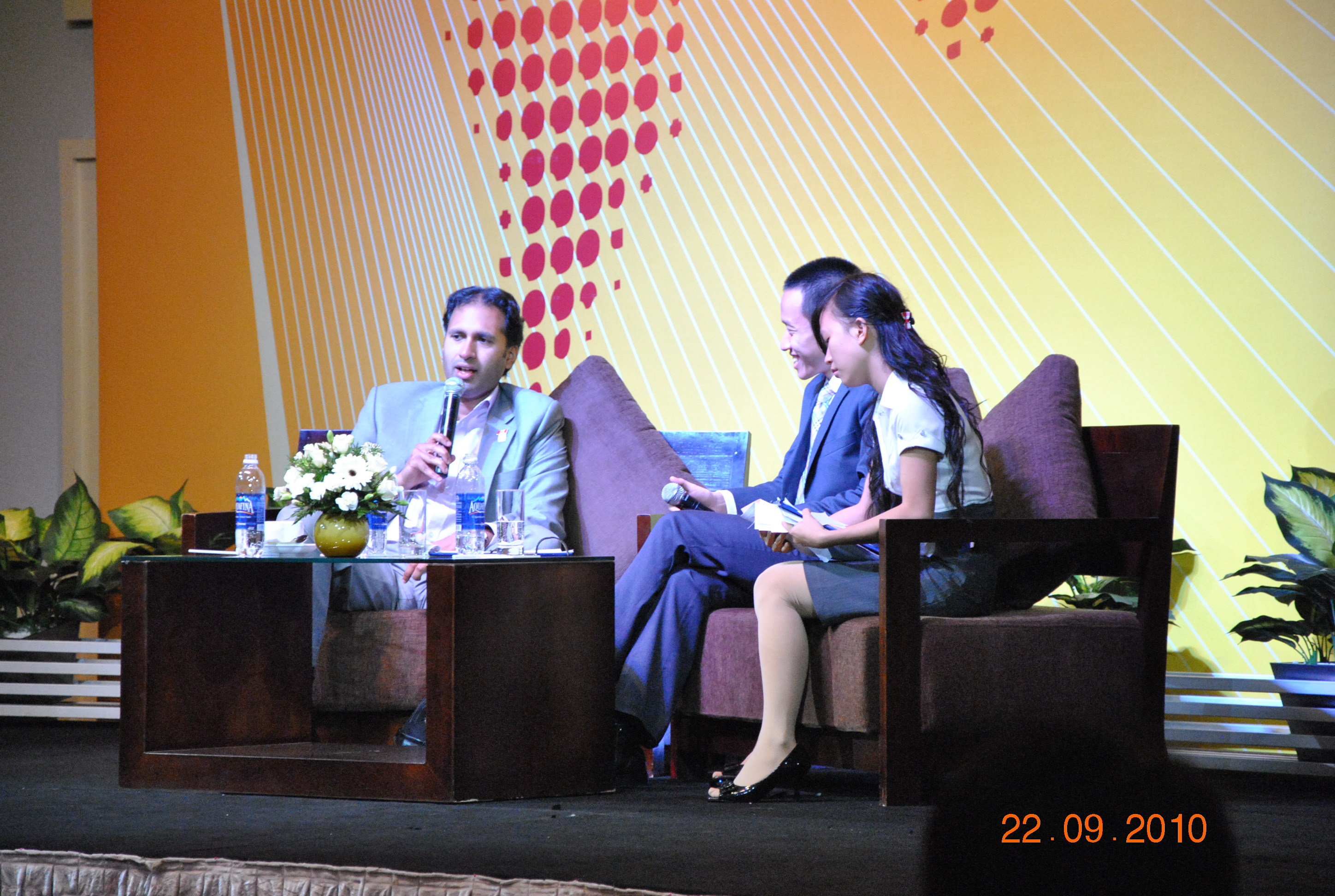
The Consul-General at a seminar, September 2010

Audri Mukhopadhyay (born 1974) is a Canadian diplomat and economist. He was the Consul General of Canada in Ho Chi Minh City, Vietnam, serving as head of mission at the Consulate General of Canada in Ho Chi Minh City. He has been featured in a number of Vietnamese publications promoting Canada-Vietnam bilateral ties, and In 2010, he was named one of Progress magazine's "People we love." He also filmed a television series for Ho Chi Minh City Television that began airing in Fall 2010. The series is part of an English language teaching programme aiming to promote Canadian culture in Vietnam. Promoting education linkages was a large part of his work in Vietnam.

Mukhopadhyay joined the Department of Foreign Affairs and International Trade in 2005. From 2002 to 2003, he was the Canadian government's representative to ICANN. He has also worked as a consultant at McKinsey & Company and as an economist with the Canadian Department of Finance.

Mukhopadhyay is a Canadian of Indian descent. He was born in Providence, Rhode Island (USA), and grew up in Halifax, Nova Scotia. He studied economics at Dalhousie University in Canada, then as a Rhodes Scholar at Oxford University, where he earned an MBA and an MPhil in economics.

He is affiliated with Woodrow Wilson International Center for Scholars in Washington, D.C., where he is a Global Fellow at the Canada Institute.
