= Taipei Economic and Cultural Office, Ho Chi Minh City =

Taipei Economic and Cultural Office, Ho Chi Minh City 駐胡志明市台北經濟文化辦事處
- Văn phòng Kinh tế Văn hóa Đài Bắc tại thành phố Hồ Chí Minh
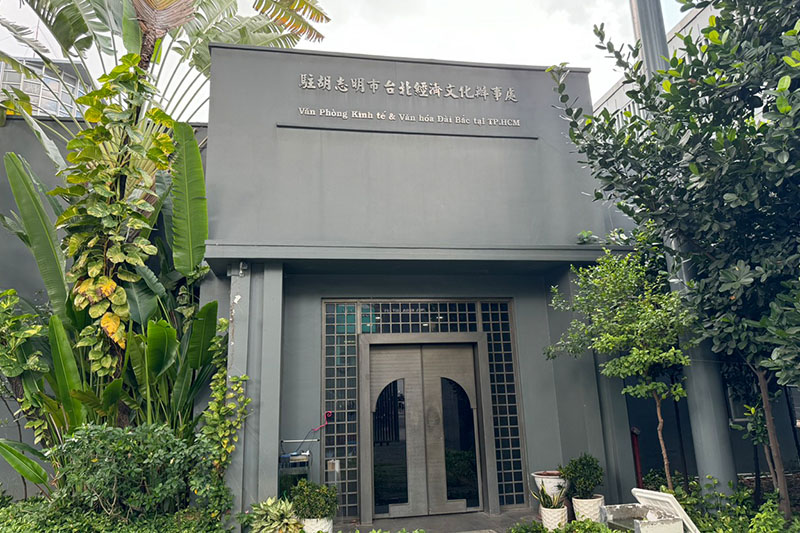
- Front entrance of Taipei Economic and Cultural Office, Ho Chi Minh City

Agency overview
- Formed: 1992
- Jurisdiction: Vietnam (southern regions); Cambodia
- Headquarters: Ho Chi Minh City
- Agency executive: Han, Kuo-Yao, Director General
- Website: Taipei Economic and Cultural Office, Ho Chi Minh City

The Taipei Economic and Cultural Office in Ho Chi Minh City (Chinese: 駐胡志明市台北經濟文化辦事處) (Vietnamese: Văn phòng Kinh tế Văn hóa Đài Bắc tại thành phố Hồ Chí Minh) represents the interests of Taiwan in the southern regions of Vietnam and Cambodia, functioning as a de facto consulate in the absence of diplomatic relations. There is also a Taipei Economic and Cultural Office in Vietnam located in Hanoi, which has responsibility for relations with the northern regions of Vietnam as well as Laos.

== History ==
The Ho Chi Minh City office, along with its counterpart in Hanoi, was established in June 1992. Until 1975, Taiwan, as the Republic of China, had an embassy in Saigon. From 1964 to 1972, General Hu Lien served as the ambassador. However, the embassy suspended operations after the defeat of South Vietnam by the Communist North, which has diplomatic relations with the People's Republic of China.

== See also ==
- Taiwan–Vietnam relations
- List of diplomatic missions of Taiwan
- List of diplomatic missions in Vietnam
- Taipei Economic and Cultural Representative Office
