= Vietnam Economic and Cultural Office, Taipei =

Representative office of Vietnam in the Republic of China

Vietnam Economic and Cultural Office in Taipei
- Location: Taipei, Taiwan
- Address: 2-3F, No. 65, Songjiang Road
- Opened: 1993; 33 years ago
- Jurisdiction: Republic of China (Taiwan)
- Permanent representative: Phan Kiều Chung
- Website: https://vnoffice-taipei.mofa.gov.vn/

The Vietnam Economic and Cultural Office in Taipei (VECO Taipei; Vietnamese: Văn phòng Kinh tế Văn hóa Việt Nam tại Đài Bắc; Chinese: 駐台北越南經濟文化辦事處) is the representative office of Vietnam in Taiwan, which functions as a de facto embassy in the absence of formal diplomatic relations. Its counterpart body in Vietnam is the Taipei Economic and Cultural Office in Hanoi.

== History ==
The office was established in 1993. This followed visits to Vietnam by the Sino-Vietnamese Industrial and Commercial Association (SVICA) and China External Trade Development Council (CETRA) in 1991, and there was also provision for a branch office being established in Kaohsiung.

Before 1975, South Vietnam recognised Taiwan as the Republic of China, and had an embassy in Taipei. Nguyễn Văn Kiểu, brother of President Nguyễn Văn Thiệu, served as minister counsellor at the embassy. He was later made ambassador. On 25 April 1975, only five days before the Fall of Saigon, Thieu flew to Taipei. In 1976, South Vietnam was reunified with the Communist-controlled North, which had maintained full diplomatic relations with the People's Republic of China.

== See also ==
- Taiwan–Vietnam relations
- List of diplomatic missions in Taiwan
- List of diplomatic missions of Vietnam
