= Taipei School in Ho Chi Minh City =

International school in Ho Chi Minh City, Vietnam

- 越南胡志明市臺灣學校; Trường Đài Bắc

Location
- Lo S3, Khu A, Do Thi Moi, Nam TP, P. Tan Phu, Q.7, HCMC
- Coordinates: 10.7244051°N 106.73035379999999°E

Information
- Type: Private, international school
- Website: www.tshcmc.edu.vn

Taipei School in Ho Chi Minh City

Chinese name
- Traditional Chinese: 越南胡志明市臺灣學校
- Simplified Chinese: 越南胡志明市台湾学校
Transcriptions
Standard Mandarin
- Hanyu Pinyin: Yuènán Húzhìmíngshì Táiwān Xuéxiào
- Wade–Giles: Yüeh-nan Hu-chih-ming-shih T'ai-wan Hsüeh-hsiao

Vietnamese name
- Vietnamese: Trường Đài Bắc

Taipei School in Ho Chi Minh City (TSHCMC; Chinese: 越南胡志明市臺灣學校; Vietnamese: Trường Đài Bắc) is a Taiwanese (Republic of China) international school in District 7, Ho Chi Minh City, Vietnam.

TSHCMC, which serves kindergarten through high school, was established on 27 October 1997. As of 2016 it has about 60 teachers, 450 ROC national students, and 60 students of other nationalities.

== See also ==
- Vietnam–Taiwan relations
