= List of diplomatic missions in Vietnam =

This is a list of diplomatic missions in Vietnam. The capital, Hanoi currently hosts 83 embassies. Ho Chi Minh City and Da Nang are host to career consulates.

This listing omits honorary consulates and trade missions, except for those that serve as de facto embassies.

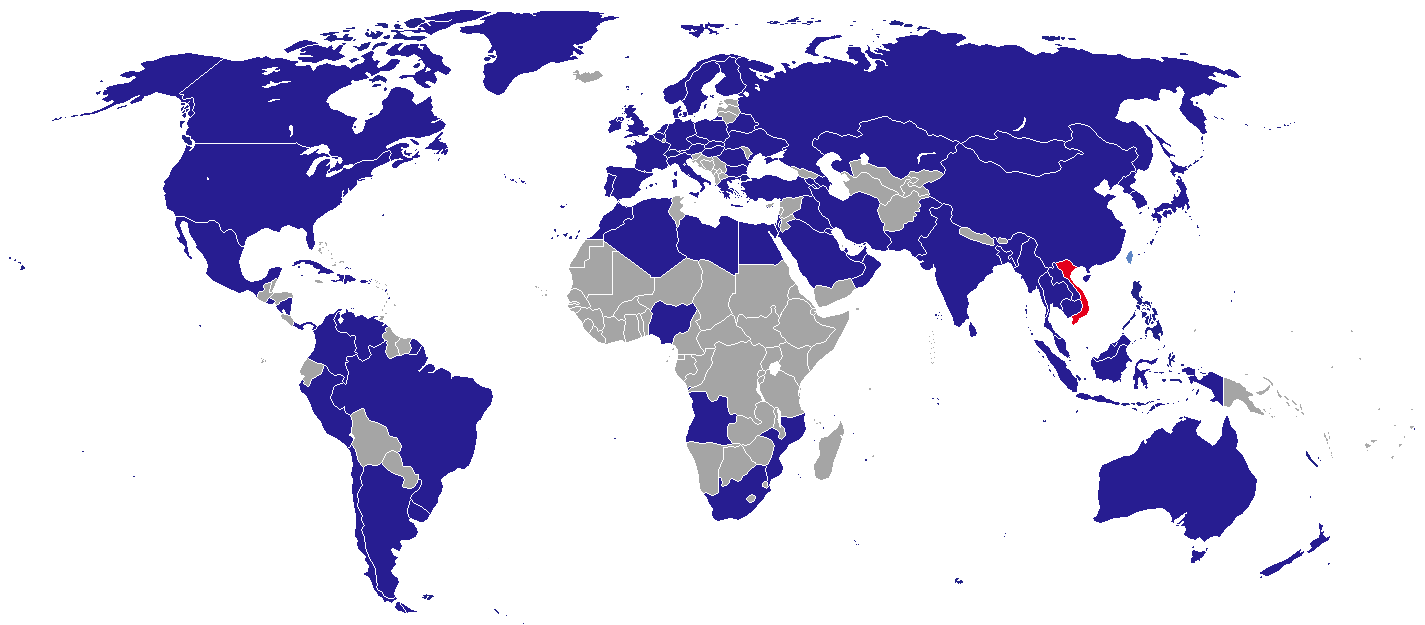
Diplomatic missions in Vietnam

== Diplomatic missions in Hanoi ==
=== Embassies ===
1. Algeria
2. Angola
3. Argentina
4. Armenia
5. Australia
6. Austria
7. Azerbaijan
8. Bangladesh
9. Belarus
10. Belgium
11. Brazil
12. Brunei
13. Bulgaria
14. Cambodia
15. Canada
16. Chile
17. China
18. Colombia
19. Cuba
20. Czechia
21. Denmark
22. Dominican Republic
23. Egypt
24. El Salvador
25. Finland
26. France
27. Germany
28. Greece
29. Haiti
30. Hungary
31. India
32. Indonesia
33. Iran
34. Iraq
35. Ireland
36. Israel
37. Italy
38. Japan
39. Kazakhstan
40. Kuwait
41. Laos
42. Libya
43. Malaysia
44. Mexico
45. Mongolia
46. Morocco
47. Mozambique
48. Myanmar
49. Netherlands
50. New Zealand
51. Nicaragua
52. Nigeria
53. North Korea
54. Norway
55. Oman
56. Pakistan
57. Palestine (article)
58. Panama
59. Peru
60. Philippines (article)
61. Poland
62. Portugal
63. Qatar
64. Romania
65. Russia
66. Saudi Arabia
67. Singapore
68. Slovakia
69. South Africa
70. South Korea
71. Spain
72. Sri Lanka
73. Sweden
74. Switzerland
75. Thailand
76. Timor-Leste
77. Turkey
78. Ukraine
79. United Arab Emirates
80. United Kingdom
81. United States
82. Uruguay
83. Venezuela

=== Other missions or delegations ===
1. Holy See (Office of the Resident Papal Representative)
2. Republic of China (Taiwan) (Economic & Cultural Office)

=== Gallery ===
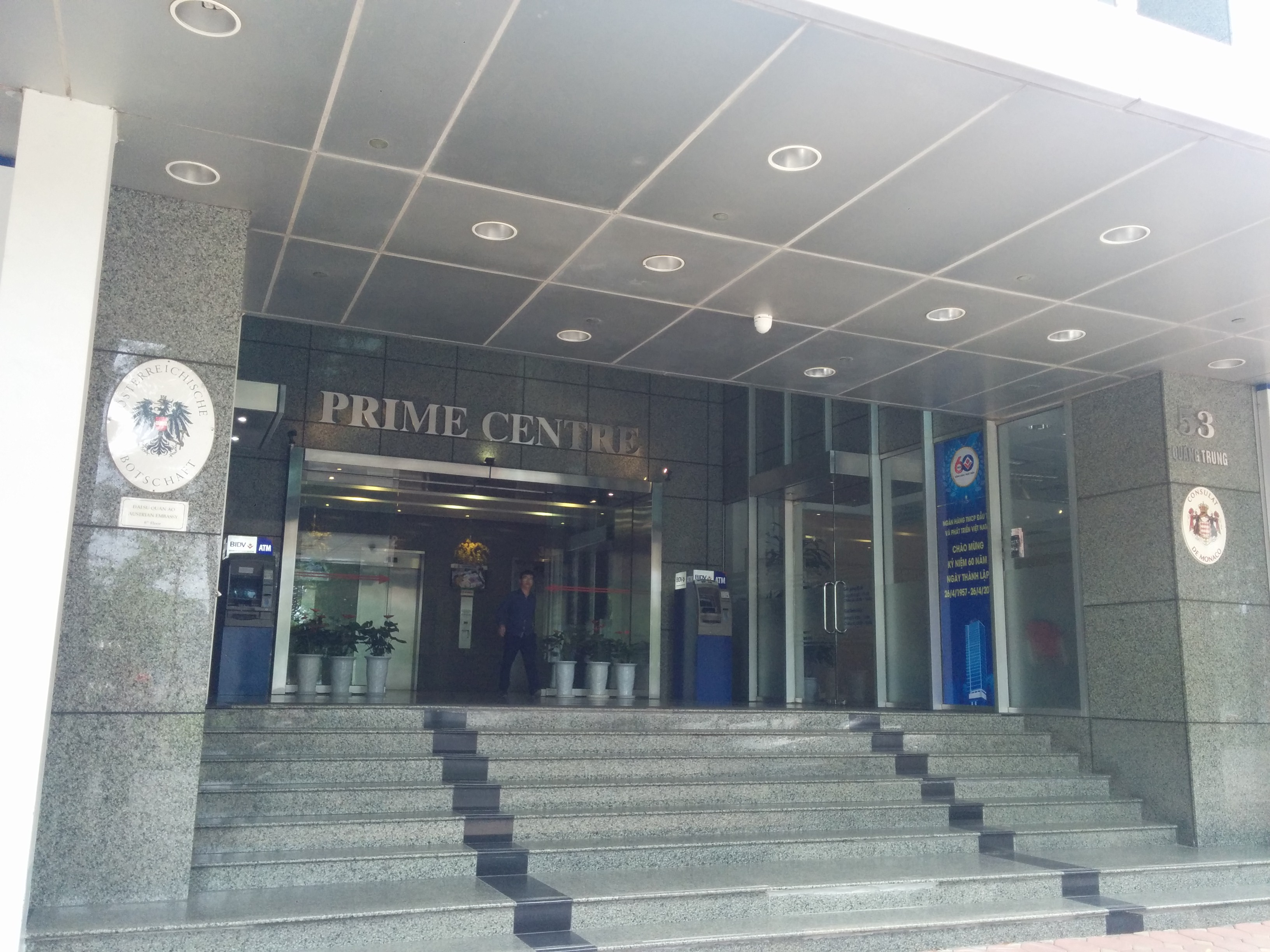
Embassy of Austria

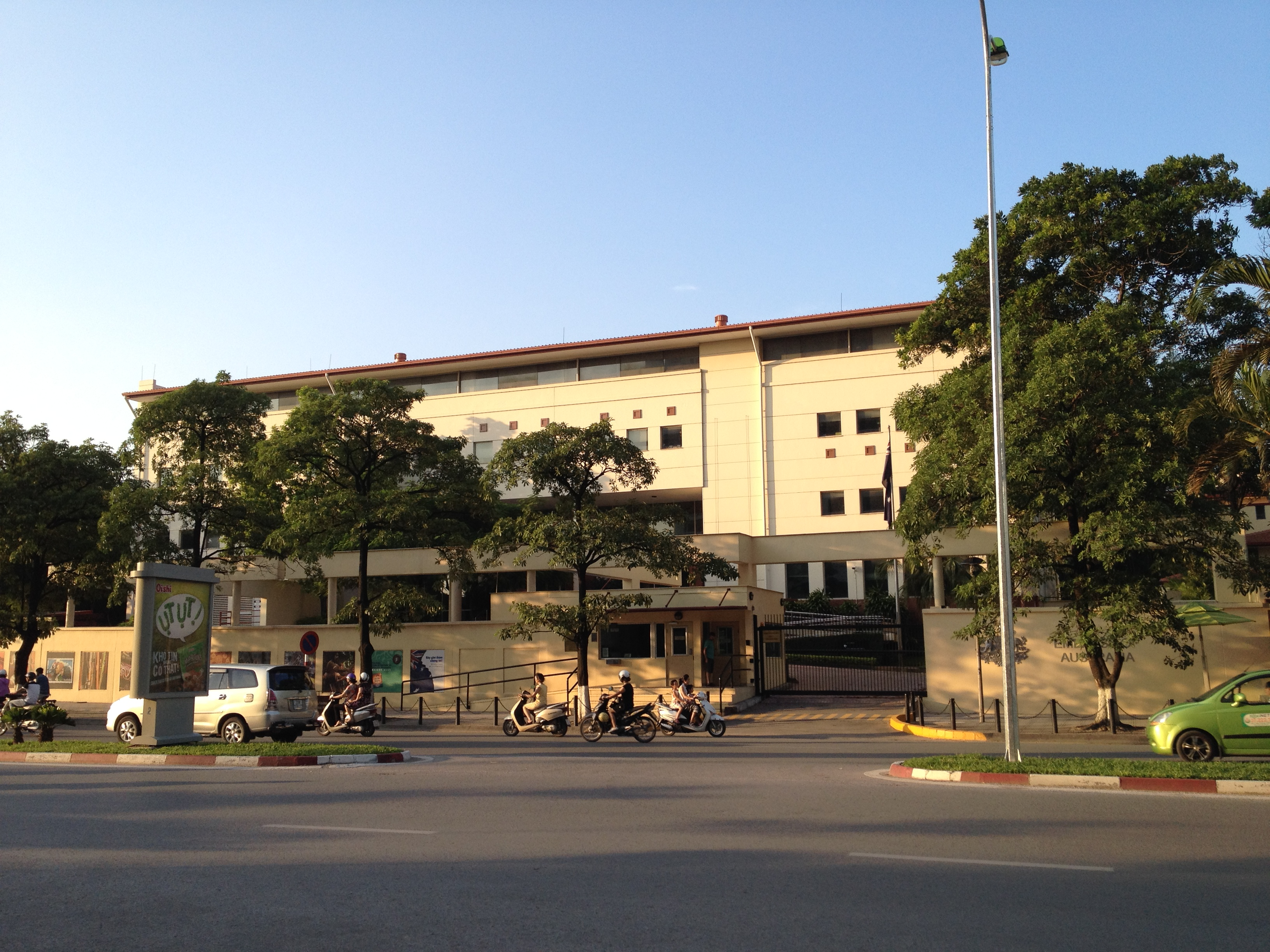
Embassy of Australia

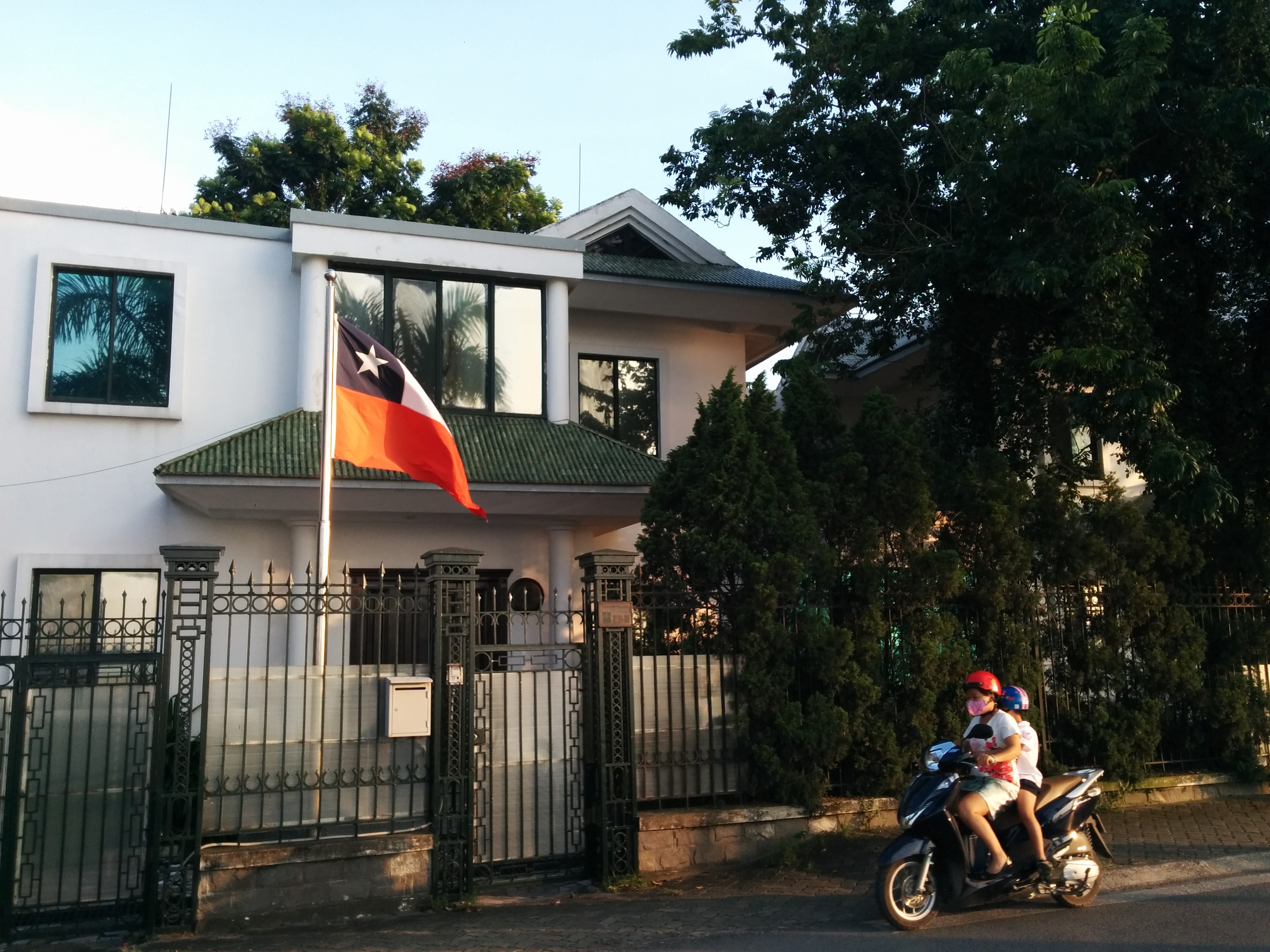
Embassy of Chile

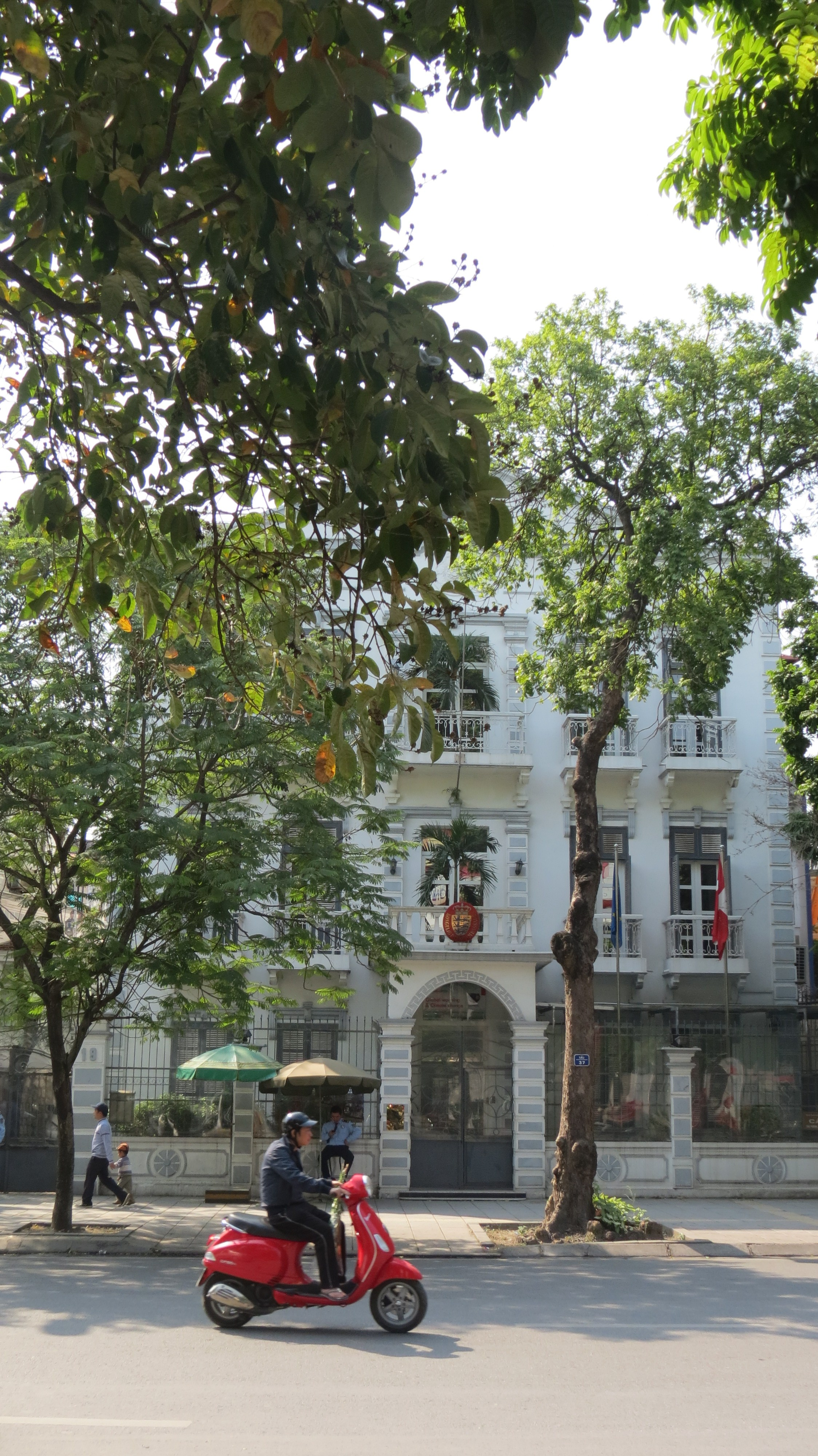
Embassy of Denmark

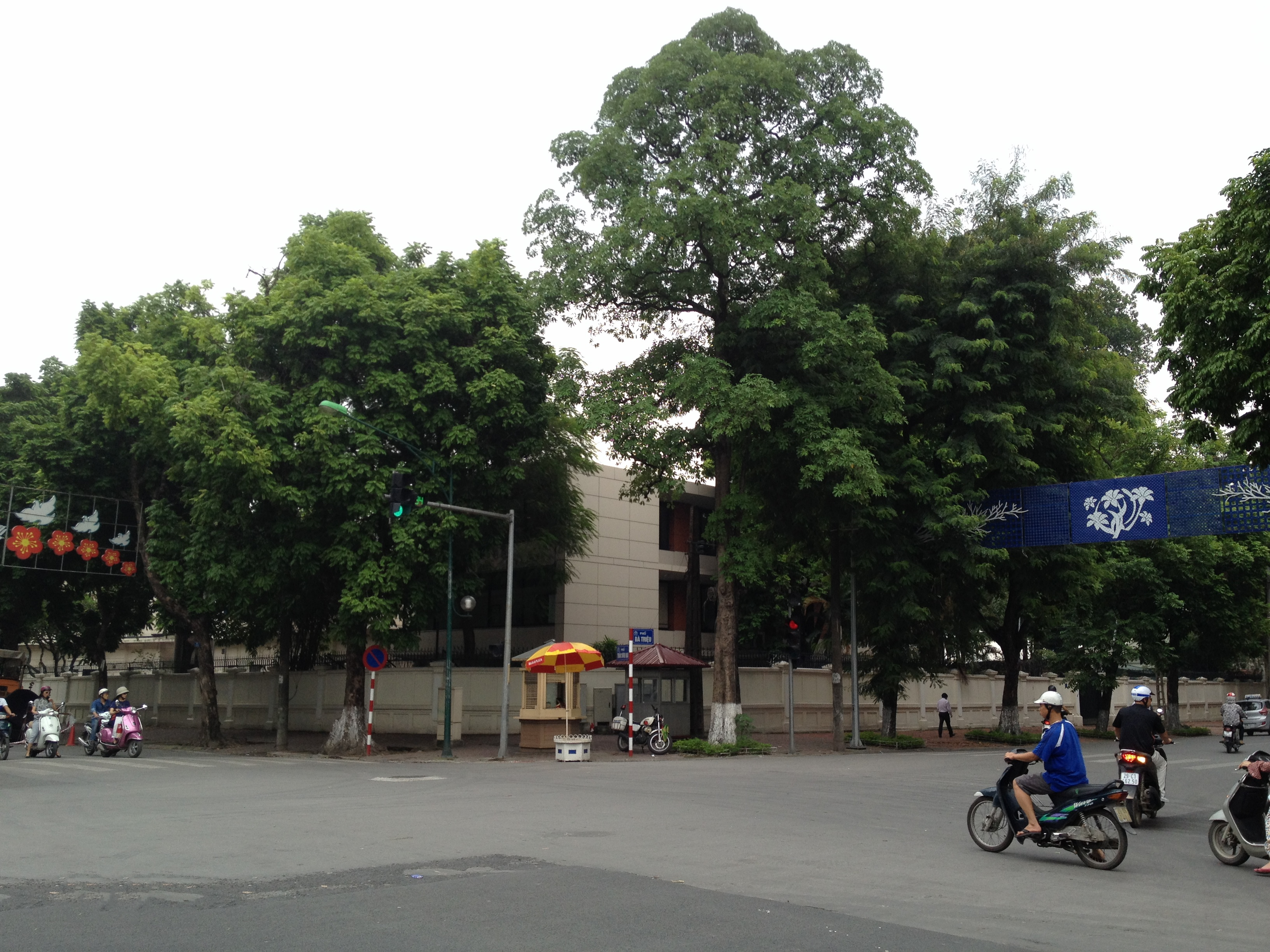
Embassy of France

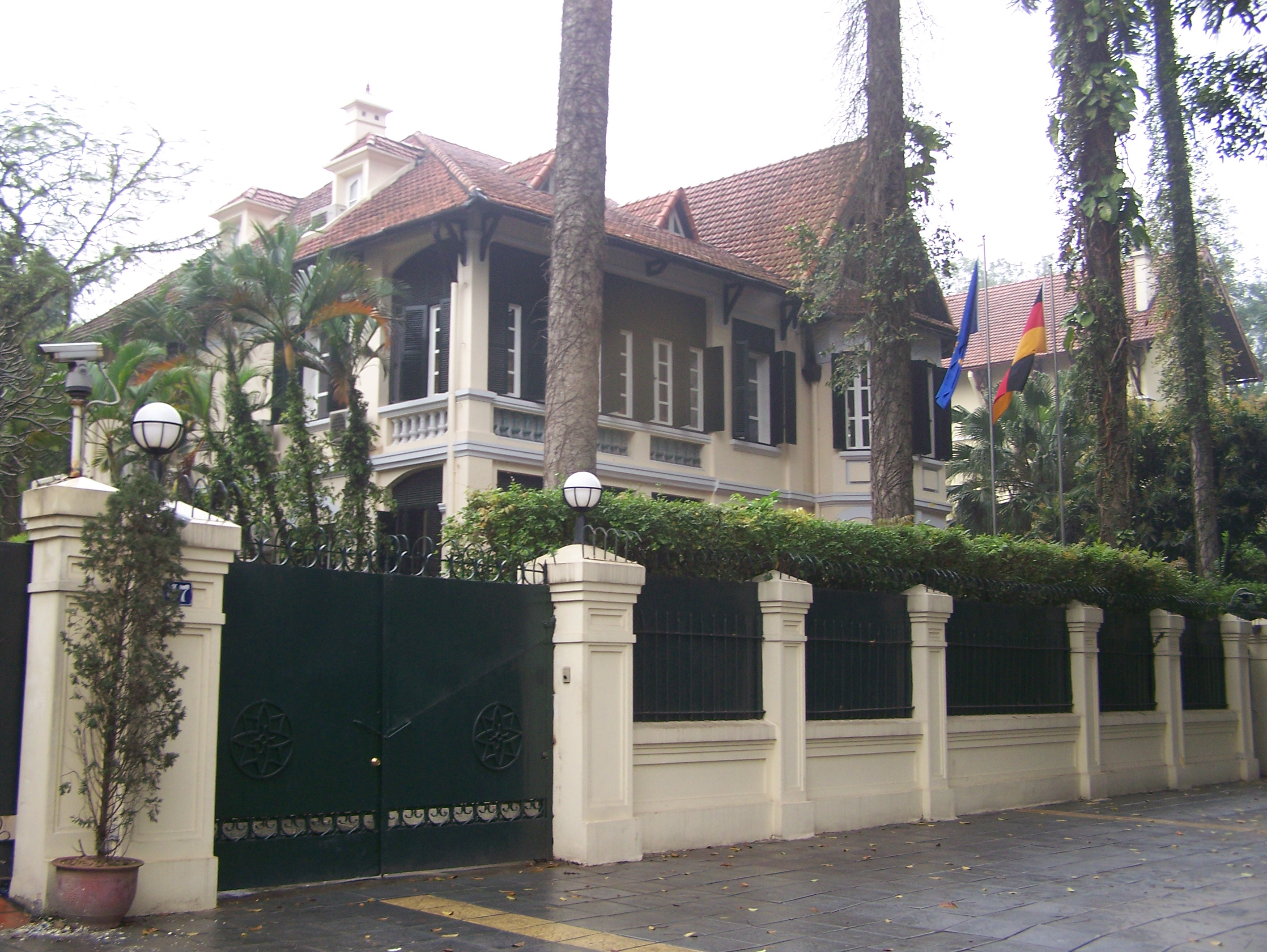
Embassy of Germany

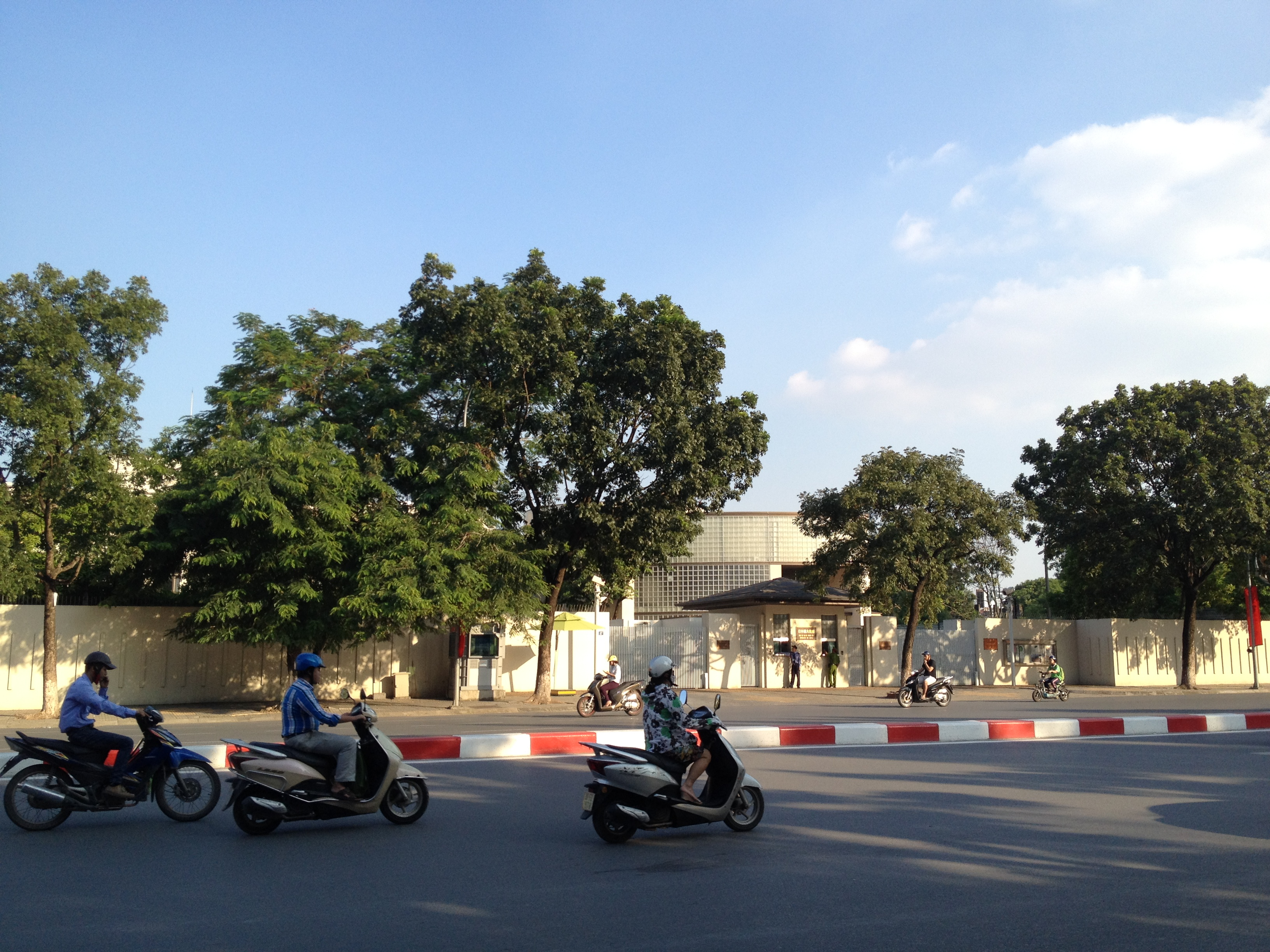
Embassy of Japan

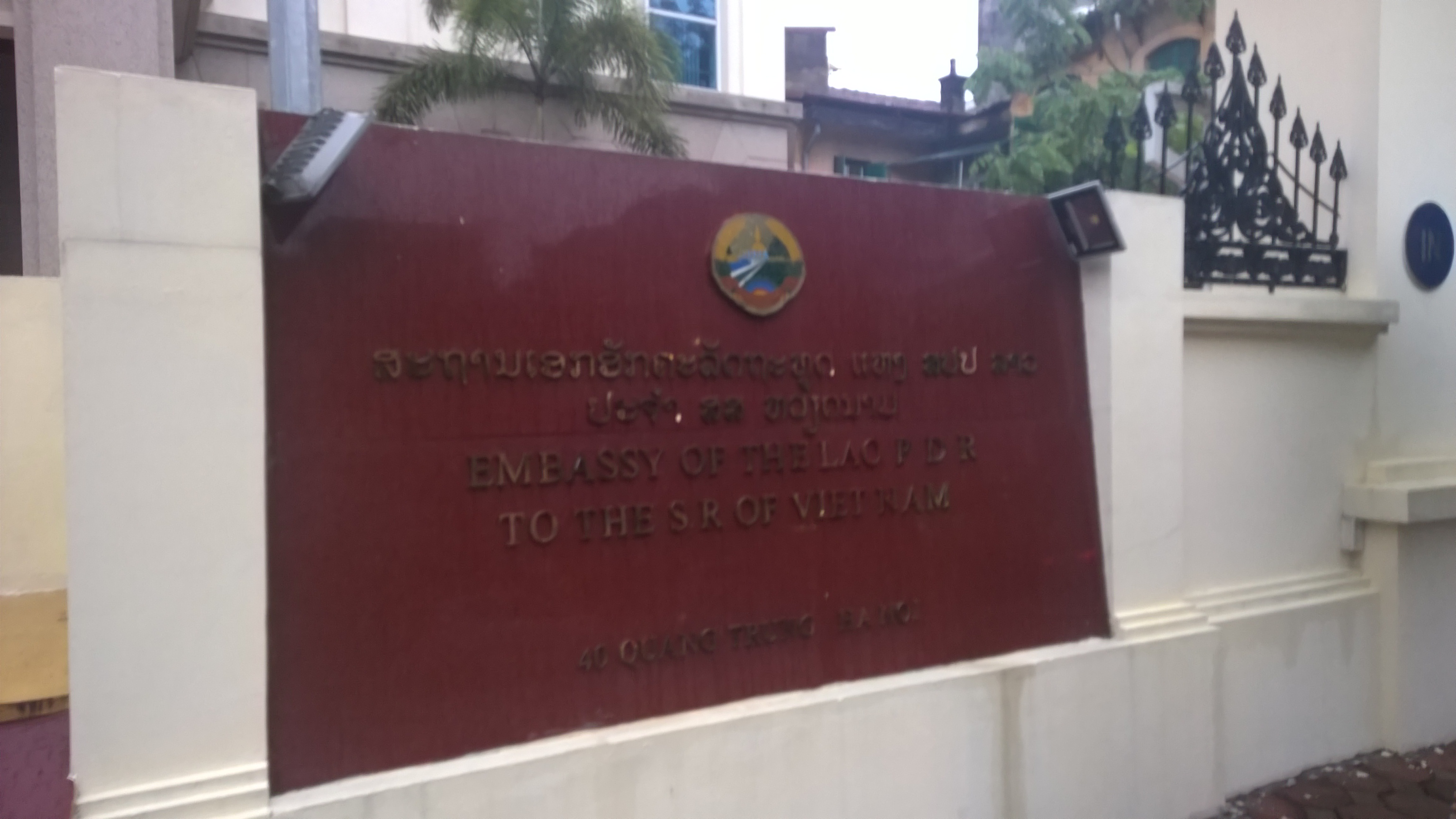
Embassy of Laos

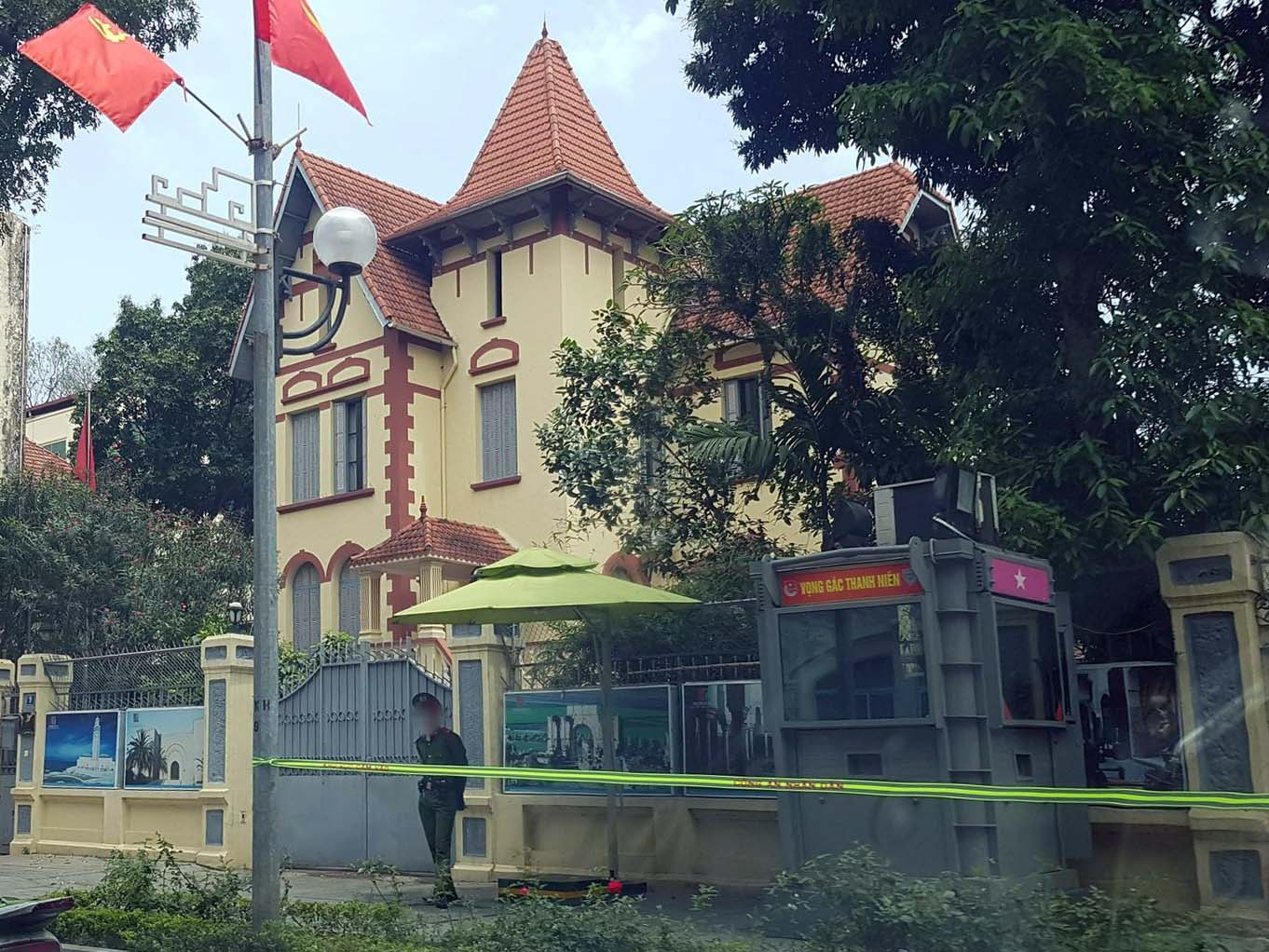
Embassy of Morocco

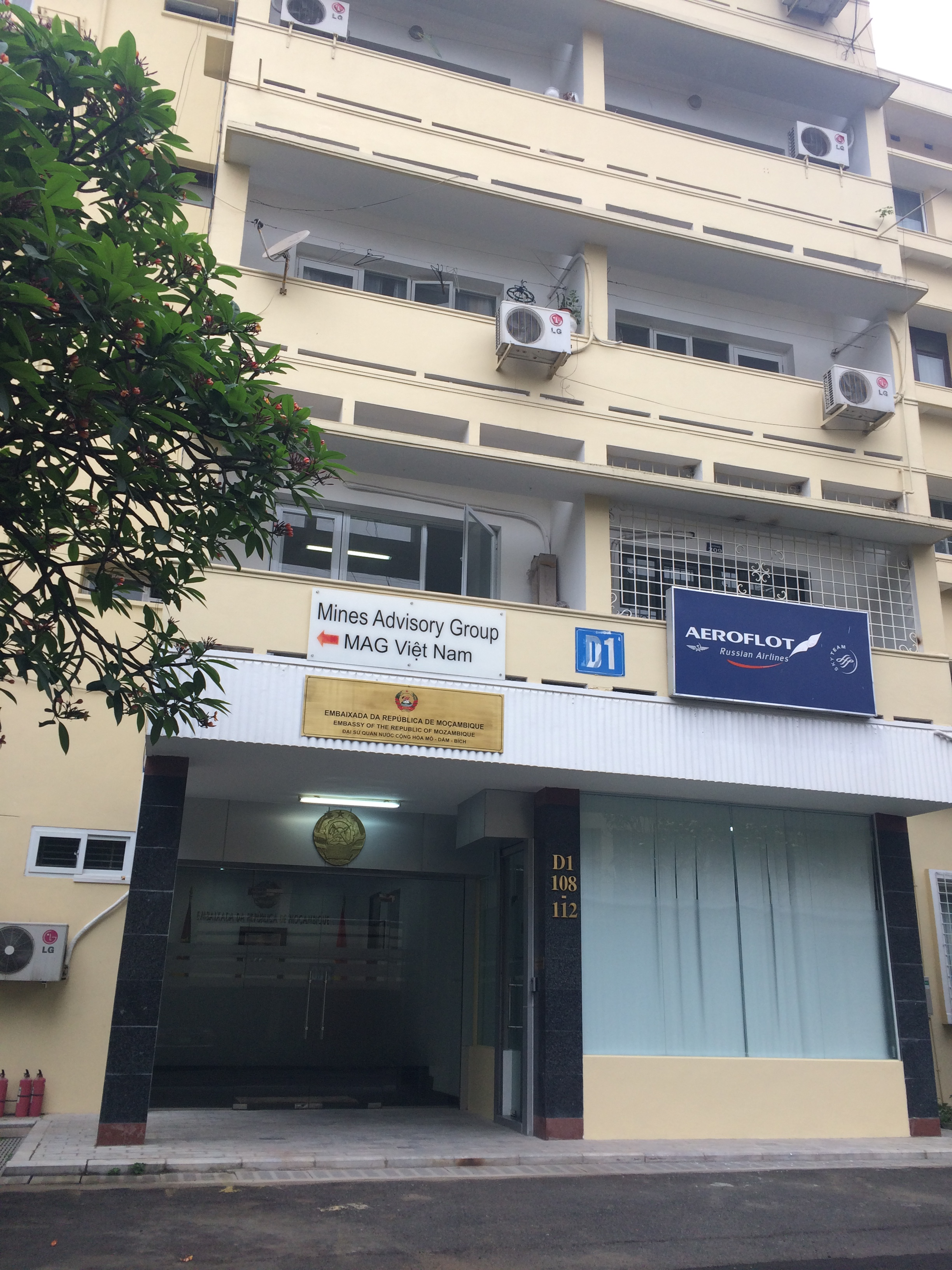
Building hosting the embassy of Mozambique

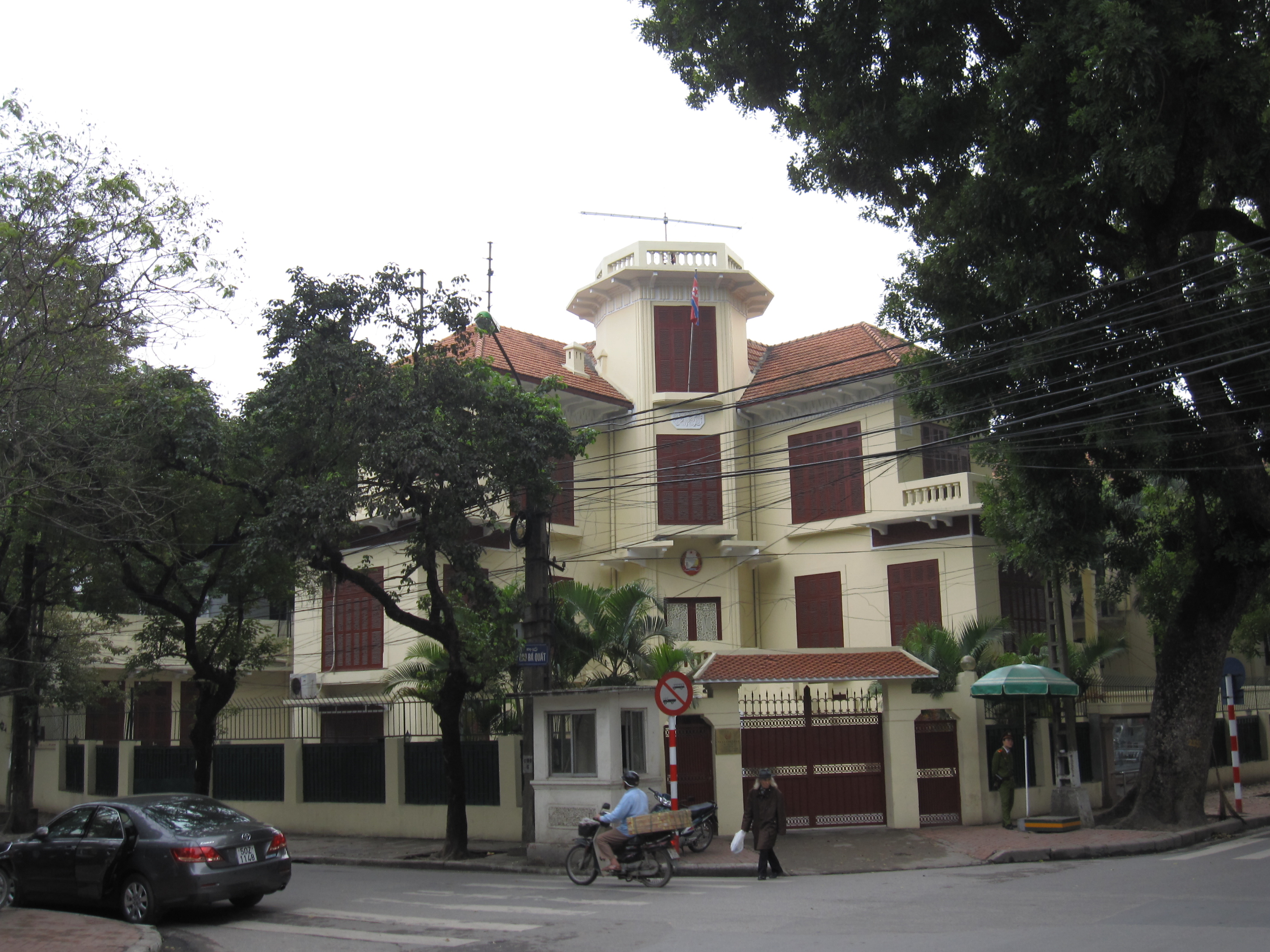
Embassy of North Korea

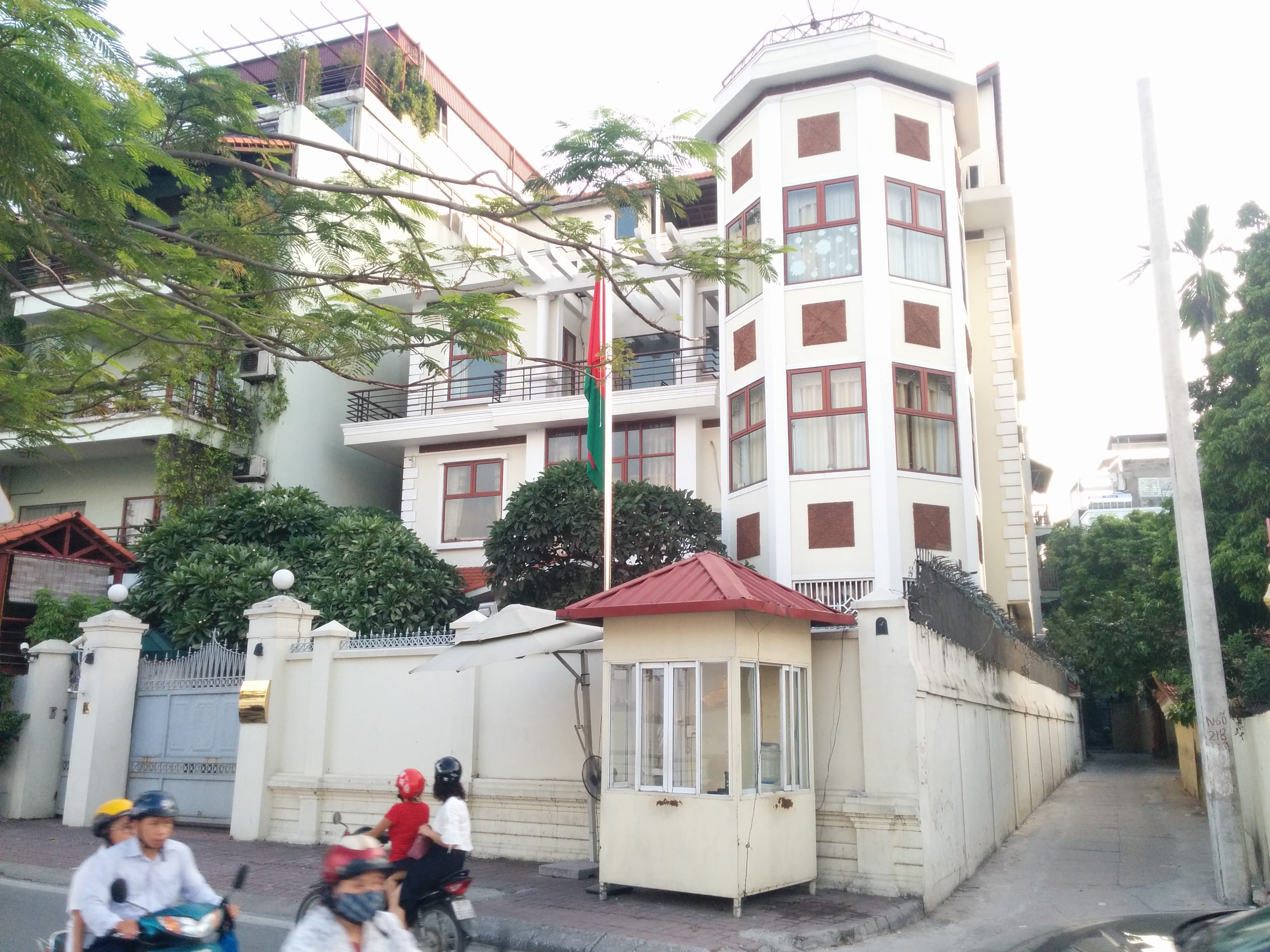
Embassy of Oman

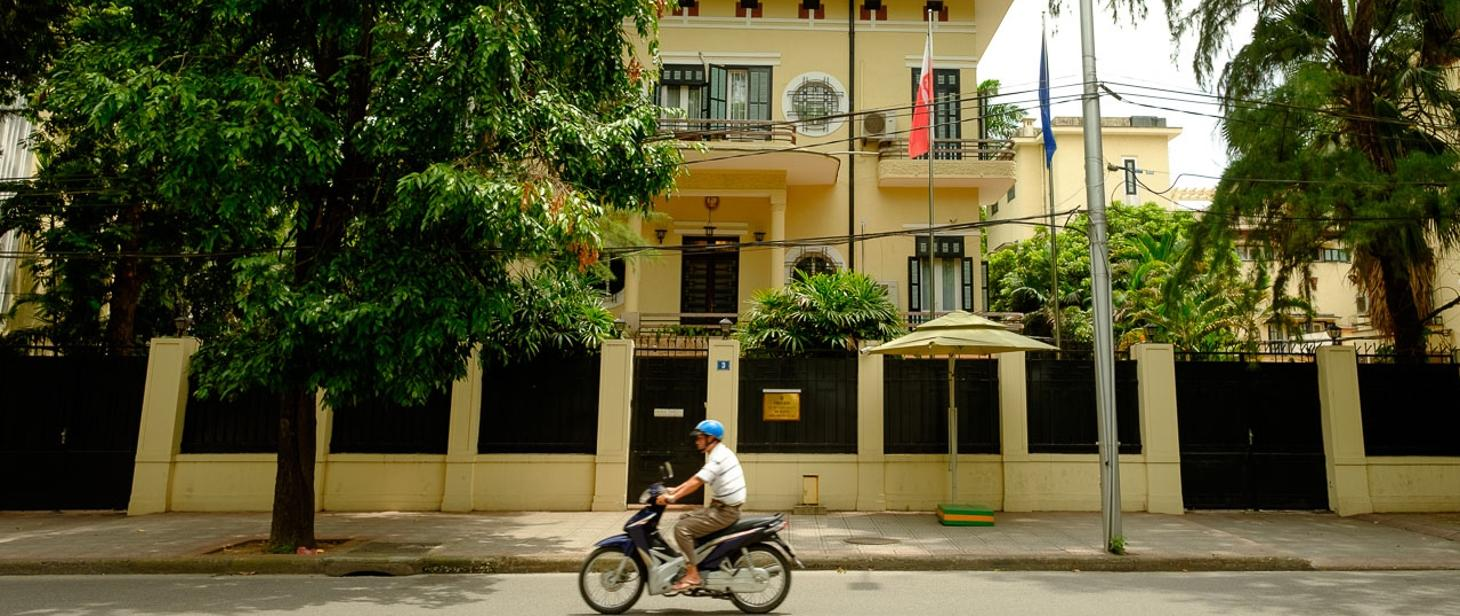
Embassy of Poland

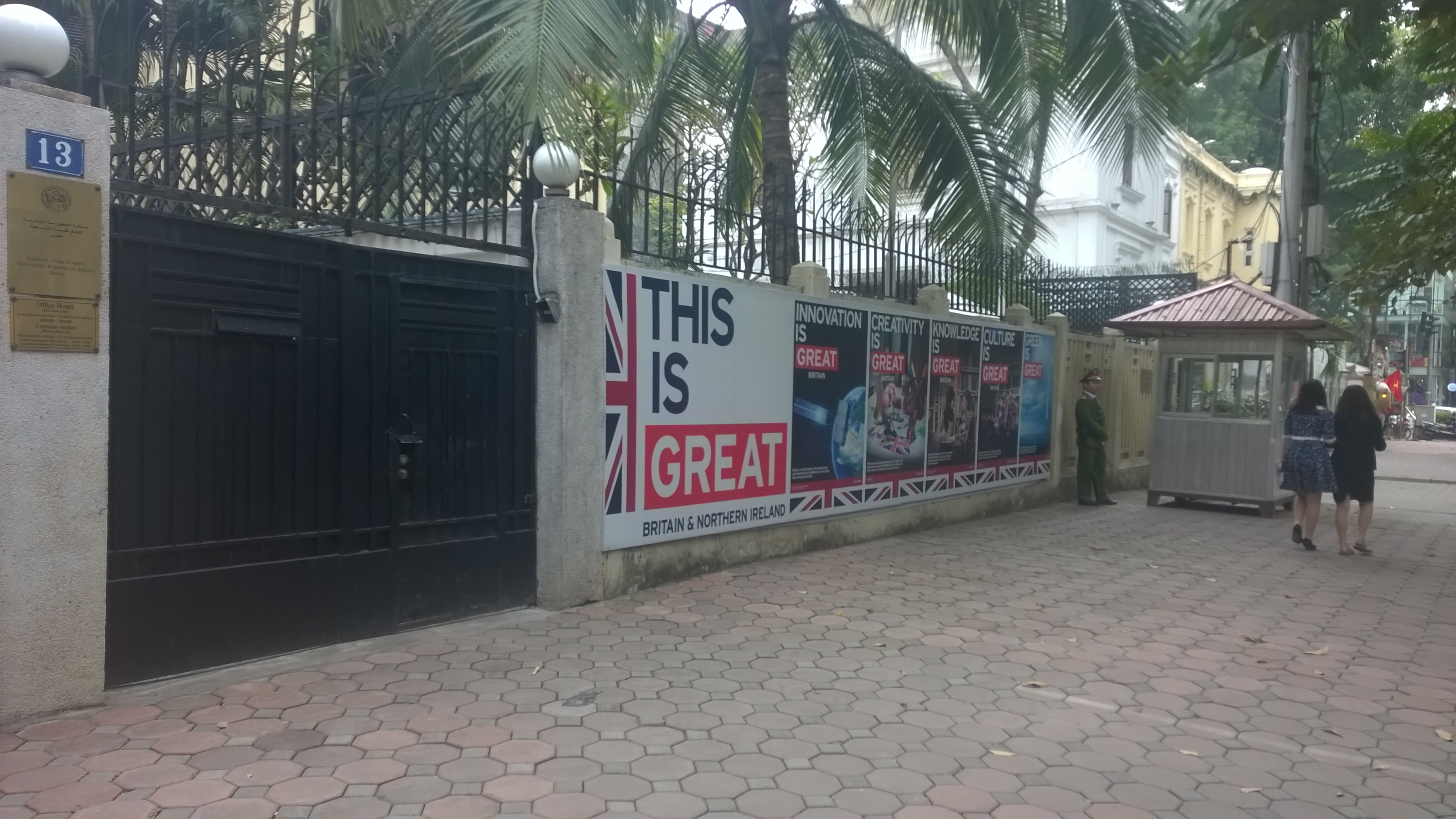
Embassy of the United Kingdom

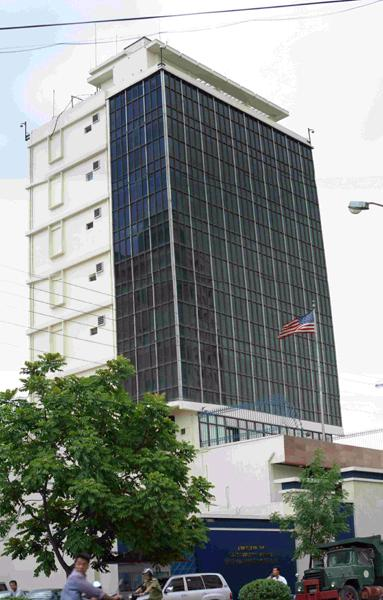
Embassy of the United States

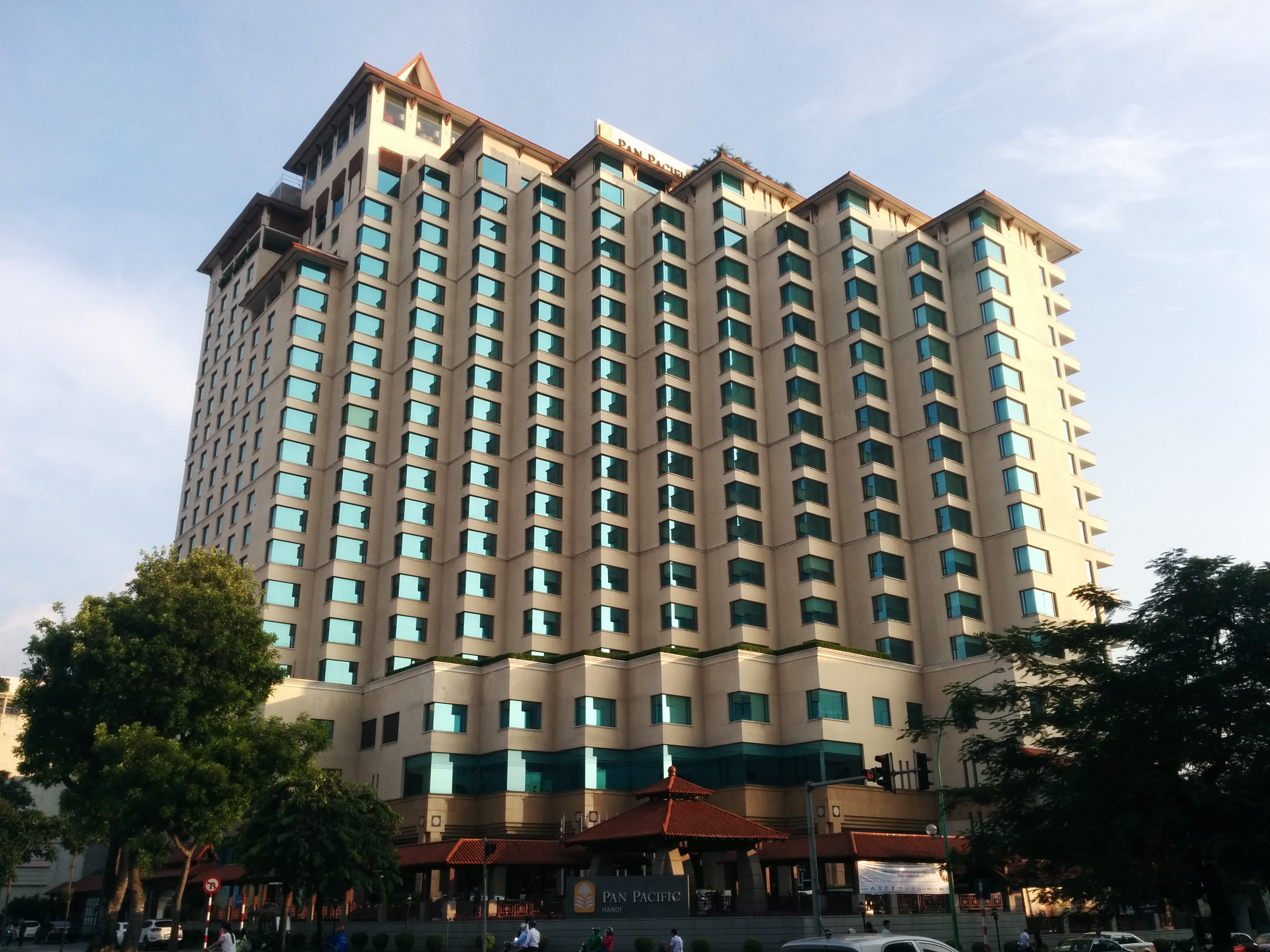
Building hosting the Office of the Resident Papal Representative

== Consular missions ==
Da Nang and Ho Chi Minh City both host career consular missions. All entries are consulates-general unless indicated otherwise.

=== Da Nang ===
1. China
2. Japan
3. Laos
4. Russia
5. South Korea

==== Gallery ====
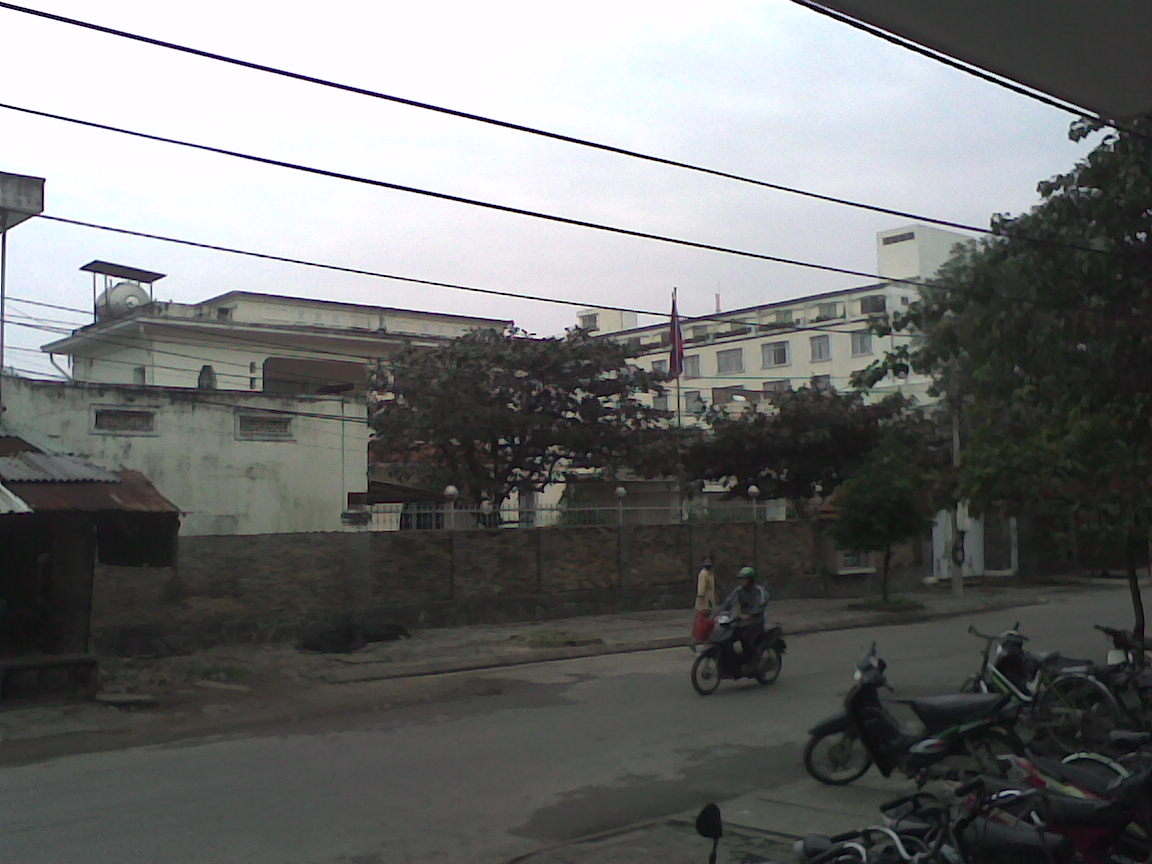
Consulate-General of Laos

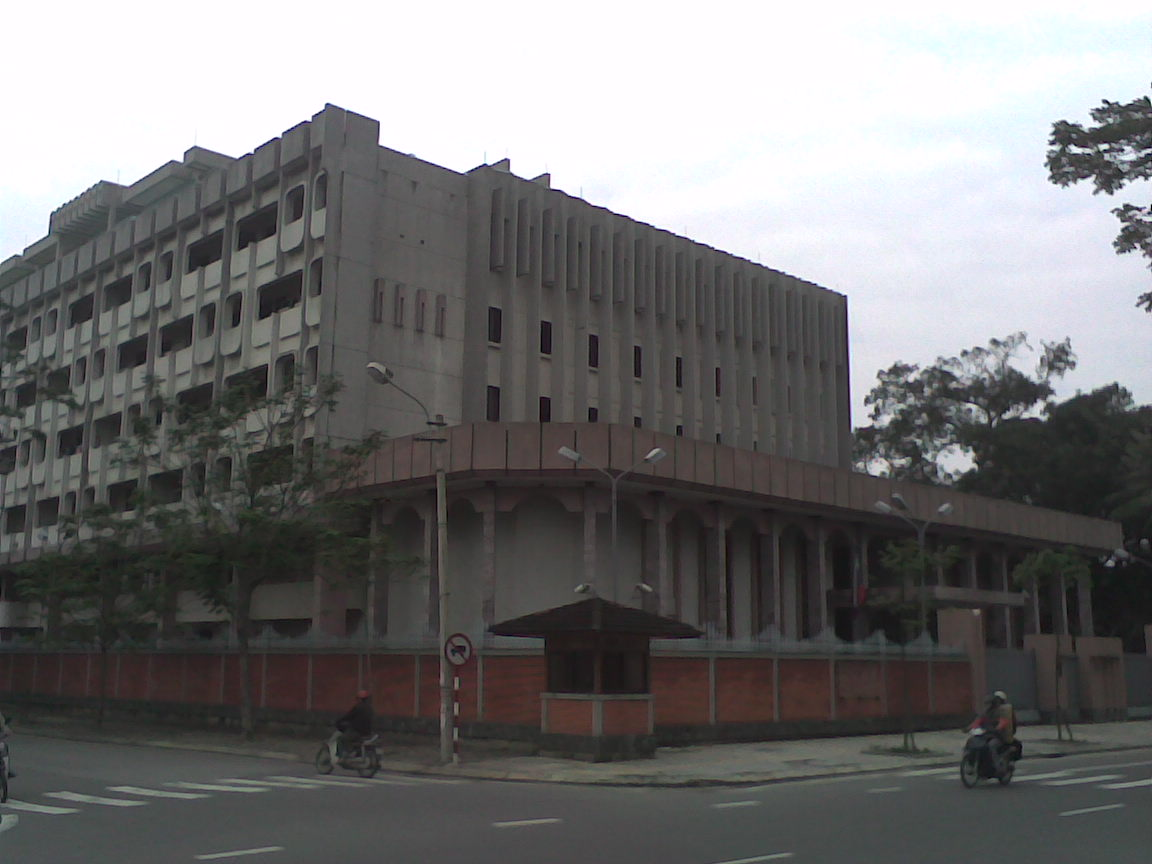
Consulate-General of Russia

=== Ho Chi Minh City ===
1. Australia
2. Belarus
3. Cambodia
4. Canada (details)
5. China
6. Cuba
7. Germany
8. France
9. Hungary
10. India
11. Indonesia
12. Italy
13. Japan
14. Laos
15. Malaysia
16. Netherlands
17. New Zealand
18. Panama
19. Philippines
20. Republic of China (Taiwan) (Economic & Cultural Office)
21. Russia (details)
22. Singapore
23. South Korea
24. Switzerland
25. Thailand
26. United Kingdom
27. United States (details)
28. Vanuatu

==== Gallery ====
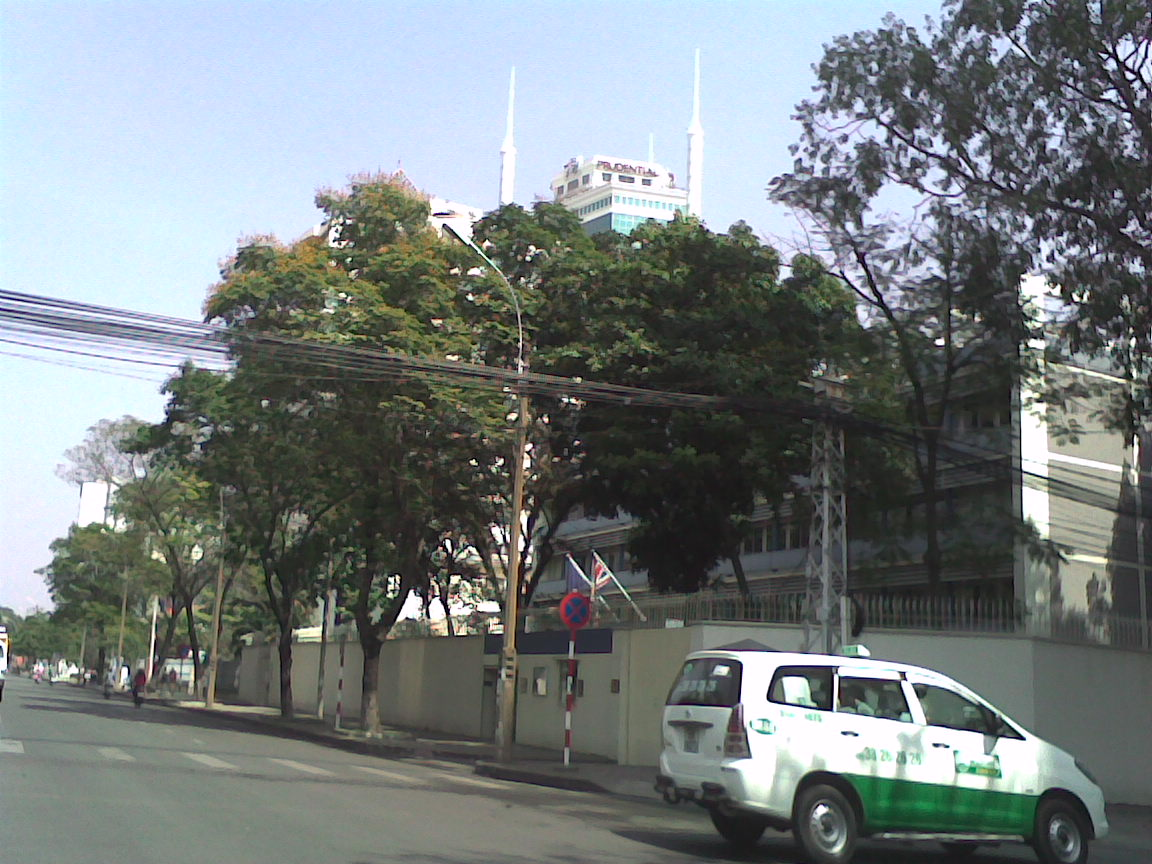
British Consulate-General

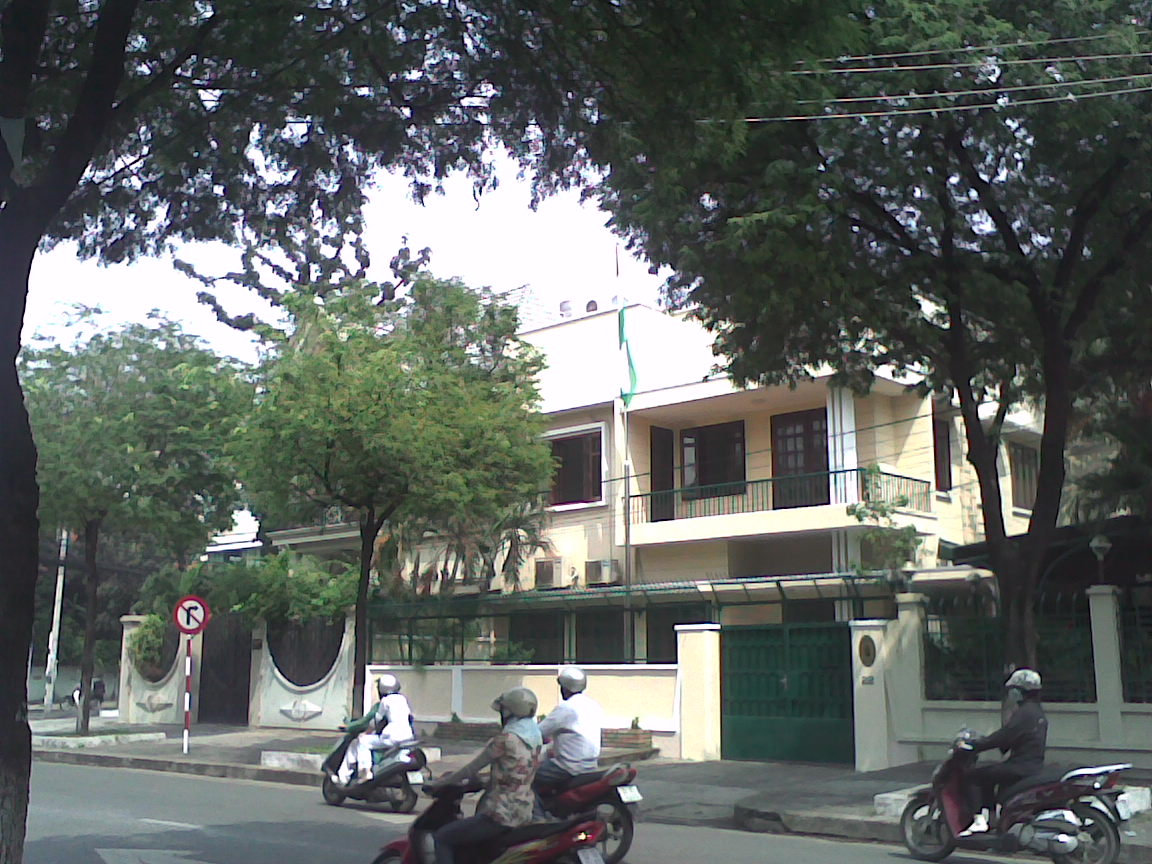
Consulate-General of Hungary

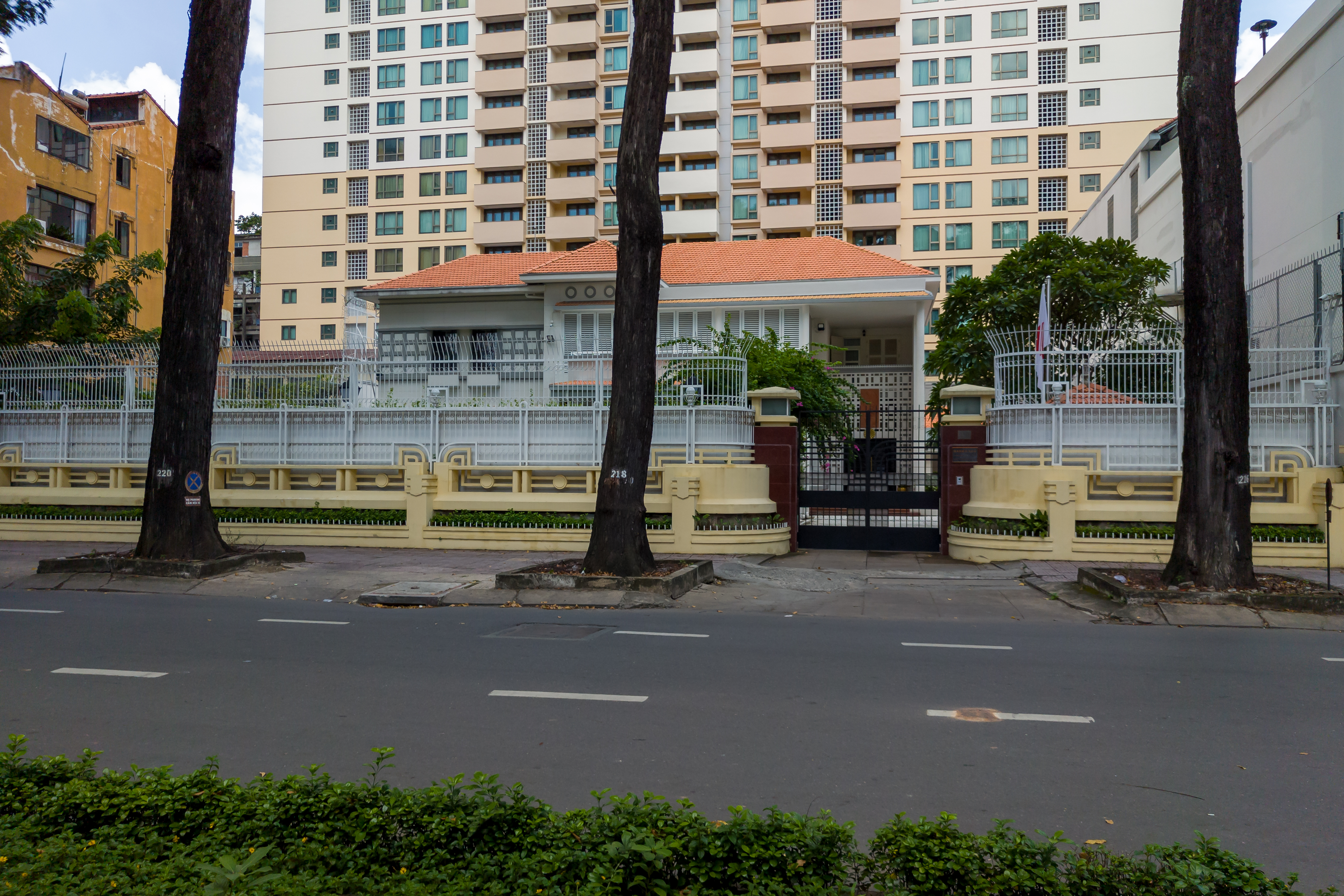
Consulate-General of Japan

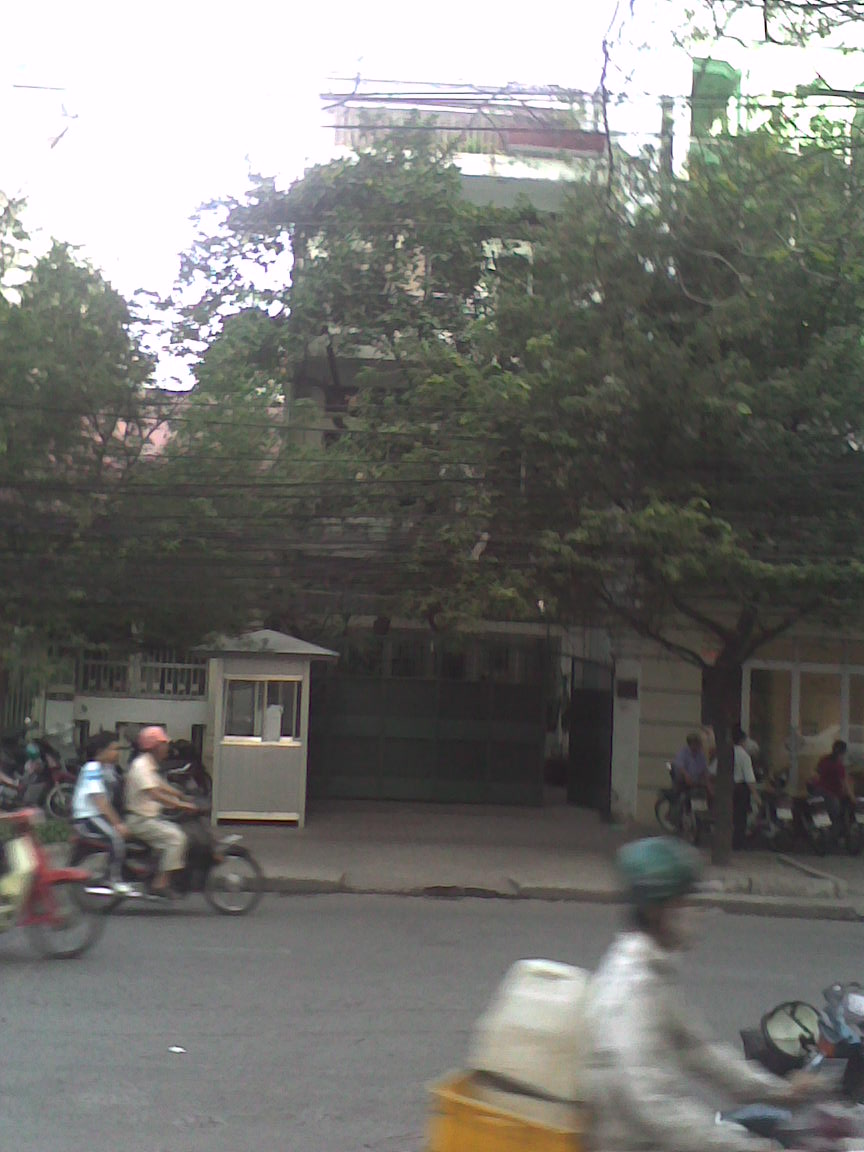
Consulate-General of Panama

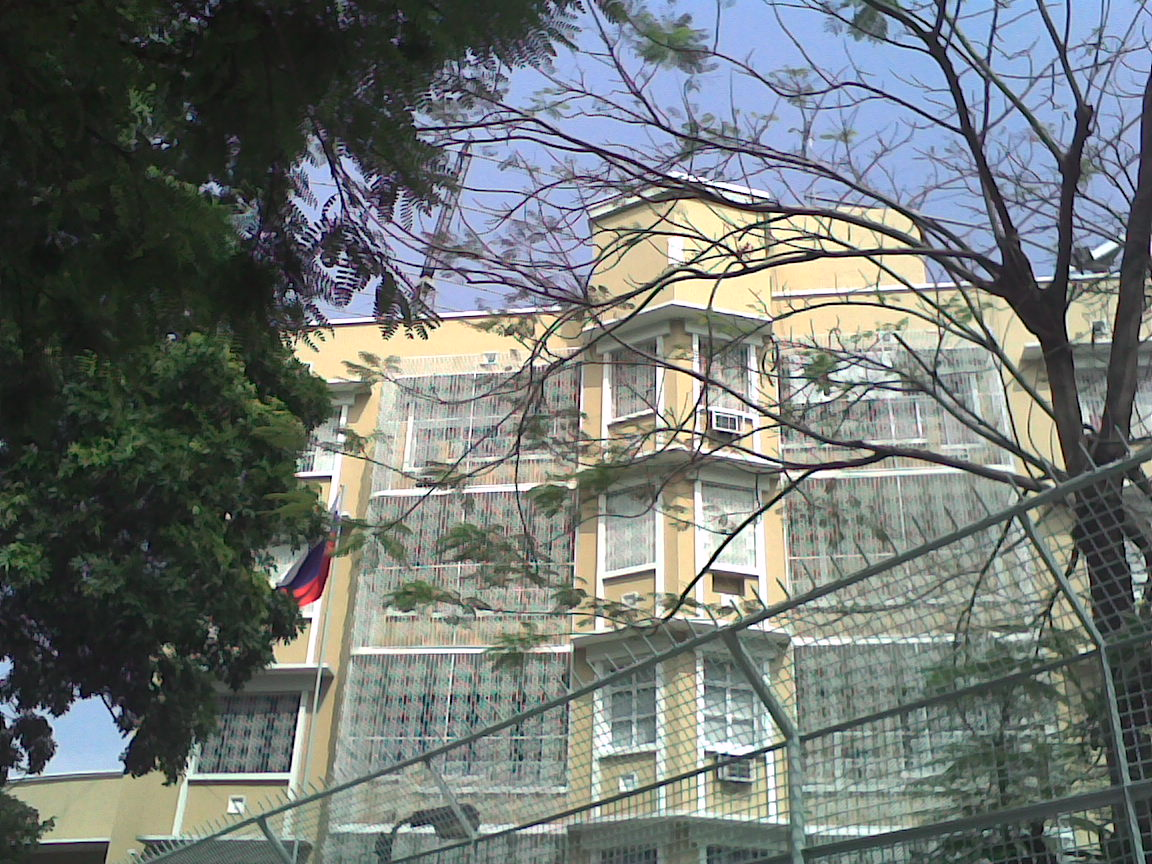
Consulate-General of Russia

== Non-resident embassies accredited to Vietnam ==
=== Resident in Bangkok, Thailand ===
- Guatemala
- Kenya
- Luxembourg
- Maldives

=== Resident in Beijing, China ===
- Afghanistan
- Bolivia
- Barbados
- Chad
- Congo-Brazzaville
- Congo-Kinshasa
- Estonia
- Gabon
- Georgia
- Guinea-Bissau
- Iceland
- Jamaica
- Latvia
- Lebanon
- Madagascar
- Malawi
- Malta
- Mauritania
- Namibia
- Rwanda
- Sierra Leone
- Slovenia
- Somalia
- Syria
- Tunisia
- Zambia

=== Resident in Kuala Lumpur, Malaysia ===
- Bosnia and Herzegovina
- Croatia
- Kyrgyzstan
- Mauritius
- Senegal
- Tanzania
- Yemen
- Zimbabwe

=== Resident in other cities ===
- Bhutan (New Delhi)
- Costa Rica (Singapore)
- Cyprus (New Delhi)
- Djibouti (Tokyo)
- Eswatini (New York City)
- Ethiopia (Seoul)
- Jordan (Singapore)
- Lithuania (Singapore)
- Marshall Islands (Taipei)
- Paraguay (Tokyo)
- Serbia (Jakarta)
- Seychelles (New Delhi)
- Uzbekistan (Jakarta)

== Missions to open ==
=== Hanoi ===
- Ecuador (Embassy)
- Ethiopia (Embassy)
- Jordan (Embassy)
- Kenya (Embassy)
- Tanzania (Embassy)

=== Ho Chi Minh City ===
- Denmark (Consulate General)
- Turkey (Consulate General)

== Closed missions ==
Host city	Sending country	Mission	Year closed	Ref.
Hanoi	Albania	Embassy	1992	
Hanoi	East Germany	Embassy (Note: East German embassy closed, due to the reunification of Germany.)	Unknown	
Hanoi	Ghana	Embassy	1966	
Hanoi	Sudan	Embassy	2018	
Hanoi	Yemen	Embassy	1993	
Hanoi	FR Yugoslavia	Embassy (Note: Serbian resident in Jakarta, Indonesia)	2002	
Hai Phong	China	Consulate	1959	
Ho Chi Minh City	Kuwait	Consulate-General	2024	
Ho Chi Minh City	Poland	Consulate-General	2008	

== See also ==
- Foreign relations of Vietnam
- List of diplomatic missions of Vietnam
