= Taipei Economic and Cultural Office, Hanoi =

Representative office of the Republic of China in Vietnam

Taipei Economic and Cultural Office in Vietnam
- 駐越南台北經濟文化辦事處; Văn phòng Kinh tế và Văn hóa Đài Bắc tại Việt Nam

Agency overview
- Formed: 1992
- Jurisdiction: Vietnam (excluding southern regions); Laos
- Headquarters: Hanoi
- Agency executive: Liu, Shih-Chung, Representative
- Website: Taipei Economic and Cultural Office in Vietnam

The Taipei Economic and Cultural Office in Vietnam (Chinese: 駐越南台北經濟文化辦事處; pinyin: Zhù Yuènán Táiběi Jīngjì Wénhuà Bànshì Chù; Vietnamese: Văn phòng Kinh tế và Văn hóa Đài Bắc tại Việt Nam) is the representative office of Taiwan in Vietnam, which functions as a de facto embassy in the absence of diplomatic relations. It also has responsibility for Laos.

Its counterpart body in Taiwan is the Vietnam Economic and Culture Office in Taipei.

There is also a Taipei Economic and Cultural Office in Ho Chi Minh City, which has responsibility for relations with the southern regions of Vietnam as well as Cambodia.

== History ==
The Hanoi office, along with its counterpart in Ho Chi Minh City, was established in June 1992. This followed visits to Vietnam by the Sino-Vietnamese Industrial and Commercial Association (SVICA) and Taiwan External Trade Development Council (TAITRA) in 1991.

Until 1975, Taiwan, as the Republic of China, had an embassy in Saigon. However, the embassy suspended operations after the defeat of South Vietnam by the Communist North, which has diplomatic relations with the People's Republic of China.

In February 2014, a former Secretary of the Office was investigated by police for reportedly cooperating to take bribes to illegally grant visas to Vietnamese students two years earlier.

== See also ==
- Taiwan–Vietnam relations
- List of diplomatic missions of Taiwan
- List of diplomatic missions in Vietnam
- Taipei Economic and Cultural Representative Office
