= Taiwanese expatriates in Vietnam =

Taiwanese expatriates and descendants in Vietnam
在越南的臺灣人 Người Đài Loan tại Việt Nam

Total population
- 20,000

Regions with significant populations
- Vietnam

Languages
- Vietnamese, Mandarin

Related ethnic groups
- Han Taiwanese, Baiyue

Taiwanese expatriates and descendants in Vietnam consist largely of expatriate businessmen and their families. The Ho Chi Minh City branch of the Taipei-based Taiwan External Trade Development Council estimates that 20,000 people from Taiwan were living in Vietnam as of 2002.

According to statistics of the United Nations High Commissioner for Refugees, there are an estimated 3,000 women in Vietnam, formerly married to Taiwanese husbands, who have been left stateless after their divorces; the women had given up Vietnamese nationality to naturalize as Republic of China citizens at the time of their marriage, but then returned to Vietnam following their divorces and gave up their Republic of China nationality in the process of applying for restoration of Vietnamese nationality. Their children, who hold only Republic of China nationality and have never previously been Vietnamese nationals, are ineligible to enter publicly supported schools in Vietnam.

== See also ==
- Taipei School in Ho Chi Minh City
