= Taiwan–Vietnam relations =

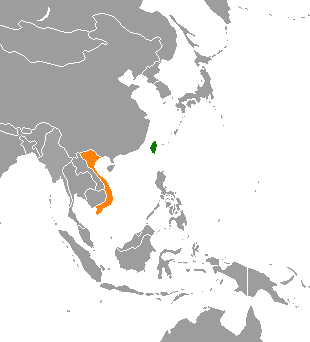
- Taiwan: Vietnam

Diplomatic mission
- Taipei Economic and Cultural Office, Hanoi: Vietnam Economic and Cultural Office, Taipei

Taiwan–Vietnam relations are conducted on an unofficial level, as Hanoi adheres to a one-China policy and officially recognises the People's Republic of China only and considers Taiwan to be an "inseparable part" of China's territory. However, this has not stopped bilateral visits, immigration and investment capital between Taiwan and Vietnam. Taiwan has been the fourth largest source of foreign direct investment in Vietnam since 2006. Both countries maintain representative offices; Taiwan is represented by the Taipei Economic and Cultural Office in Hanoi and Ho Chi Minh City (Saigon), while Vietnam is represented by the Vietnam Economic and Cultural Office in Taipei, both acting as de facto embassies. Vietnam is, to date, the only communist state to have informal relations with Taiwan.

== History ==
=== Dutch Formosa ===
Vietnamese slaves were taken by the Dutch East India Company to Taiwan when it was under Dutch rule, and the Dutch on Taiwan conducted trade with Vietnam. The Nguyễn lords-ruled Đàng Trong was known to the Dutch as Quinam. The Dutch had Pampang and Quinamese slaves on their colony in Taiwan, and in 1643 offered rewards to aboriginal allies who would recapture the slaves for them when they ran away. Eighteen Quinamese and Javanese slaves were involved in a Dutch attack against the Tammalaccouw aboriginals, along with 110 Chinese and 225 troops under Governor Traudenius on 11 January 1642. Seven Quinnamese and three Javanese were involved in a gold hunting expedition along with 200 Chinese and 218 troops under Serior Merchant Cornelis Caesar from November 1645 to January 1646. The Dutch sided with the Trịnh lords of Tonkin (North Vietnam) against the Nguyễn lords during the Trịnh–Nguyễn War and were therefore hostile to Quinam (South Vietnam).

=== Aftermath of World War II ===
Following World War II, under an Allied mandate, had 200,000 Chinese troops, led by General Lu Han, sent by Chiang Kai-shek to Indochina north of the 16th parallel to accept the surrender of Japanese occupying forces. The troops remained in Indochina until June 1946. The Chinese supported the Việt Nam Quốc Dân Đảng and Việt Nam Cách mệnh Đồng minh Hội to put pressure on the communist-led Việt Minh. Nevertheless, Chinese occupational forces allowed Ho Chi Minh's Democratic Republic of Vietnam (established in 1945) more influence than their British counterparts in the south. Chiang Kai-shek threatened the French with war to force them to negotiate with Ho Chi Minh. In February 1946, Chiang forced the French colonists to surrender all of their concessions in China and to renounce their extraterritorial privileges in exchange for withdrawing from northern Indochina and for allowing French troops to reoccupy the region. The Ho–Sainteny Agreement was signed to affirm these arrangements.

=== Relationship with South Vietnam ===
South Vietnam–Taiwan relations
- South Vietnam: Taiwan

The State of Vietnam and its successor, the Republic of Vietnam (South Vietnam), had diplomatic relations with the Republic of China (which the regime was driven in 1949 to Taiwan, the island formerly under Japanese rule from 1895 to 1945) due to the two countries' common anti-communist policies. Ngo Dinh Diem's government established formal relations with the ROC in 1955. The relationship between the two governments was quite close, far better than the Republic of China's relations with other decolonized countries in southeast Asia; Taipei received more presidential visits from South Vietnam than it did from any other country in the region.

Students from South Vietnam studied in Taiwan, and Taipei provided material and logistical support to Saigon during the Vietnam War. The Republic of China sought to provide Southeast Asian countries with its own hard-earned and bitter expertise in anti-communist affairs, and South Vietnam was a major recipient of these lessons. ROC's ambassador to Saigon from 1964 until 1972 was Hu Lien, a ROC Army general with significant military experience during the Chinese Civil War. Taipei and Saigon were even sister cities. However relations were occasionally strained, especially over the issue of overseas Chinese in the country, many of whom held Republic of China nationality, estimated by Taipei at 1.2 million. Taipei was offended by Saigon's low estimates of their population, among other things. After an initial period of challenges, relations between the Republic of China and the Republic of Vietnam improved as both countries shared an anti-communist stance, fostering various educational and cultural exchanges centered on Confucian traditions, East Asian culture, and Mandarin language study.

Just before the fall of Saigon, President of the Republic of Vietnam Nguyen Van Thieu fled to Taipei, where his brother, Nguyen Van Kieu, was serving as ambassador. An aircraft of Air Vietnam, the South Vietnamese airline, was abandoned at Taipei Songshan Airport, and eventually became the property of a ROC-based airline.

=== Collapse and reopening of relations ===
After the collapse of its South Vietnamese ally, Taipei initially maintained a policy of zero contact with Vietnam, not even private trade and postal contact; furthermore followed by the 1987 Lieyu massacre with innocent Vietnamese refugees suffered. Furthermore, it was revealed that those Vietnamese boat people were overseas Chinese families. This left it ill-placed to take advantage of the rapid deterioration in relations between Hanoi and Beijing, even during the Sino-Vietnamese War and its aftermath. For its part, Vietnam, like other socialist states, expressed displeasure with Beijing in foreign relations by siding more closely with its rival in the Communist bloc, the Soviet Union; for a socialist country to have contact with capitalist Taiwan was unthinkable. However, in the late 1980s, as the Cold War thawed, contact between Hanoi and Taipei slowly resumed; indeed, observers saw this as one of the key events indicating the end of the Cold War in the region.

In 2015, Taiwanese legislator Chung Chia-pin of the Democratic Progressive Party, whose constituency in Pingtung is home to Vietnamese expatriates in Taiwan, founded a Taiwan-Vietnam parliamentary friendship association.

== Bilateral visits ==
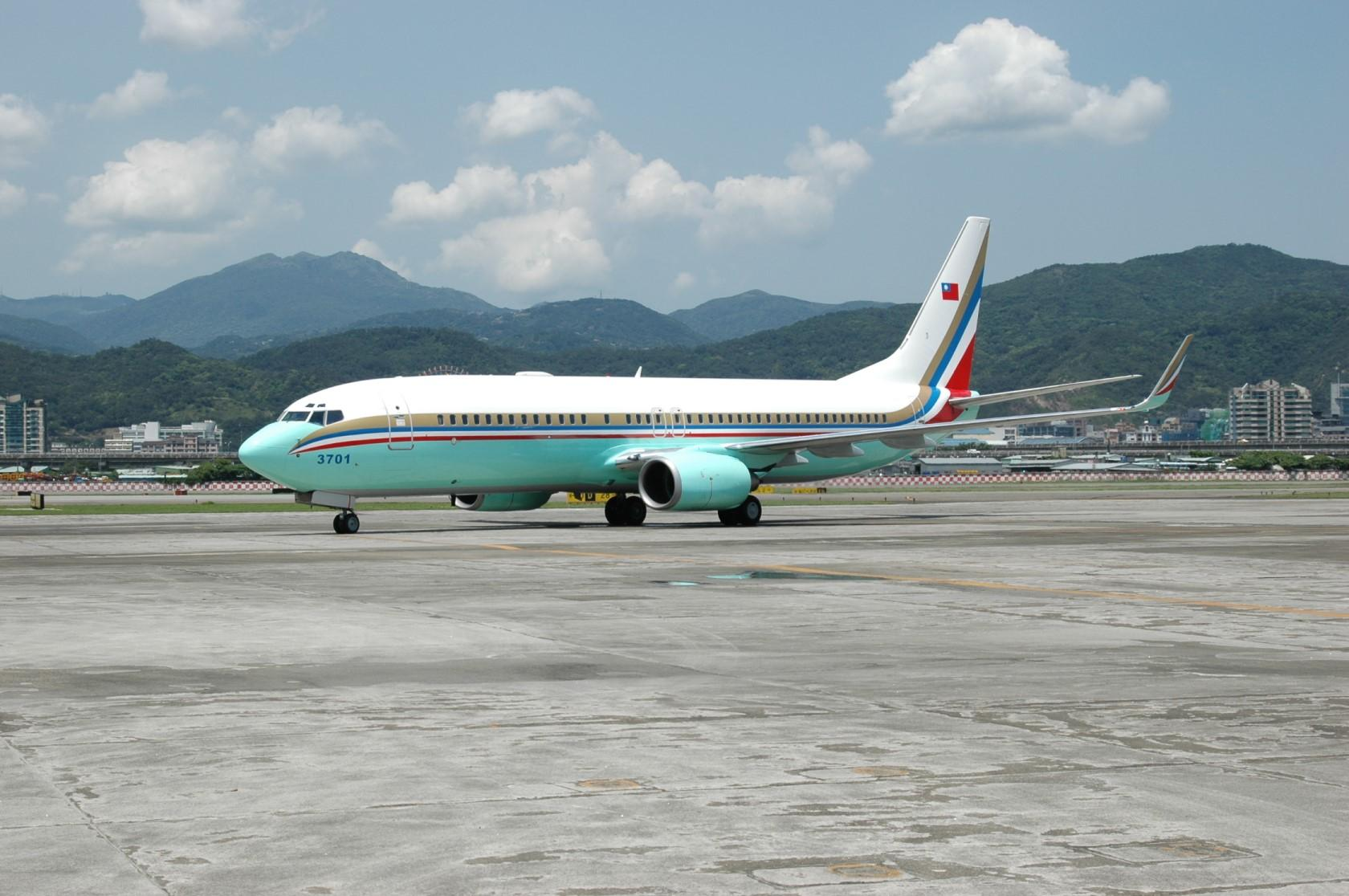
The Boeing 737-800 of the Republic of China Air Force Chang flew to Hanoi

In 2006, Taiwan Semiconductor Manufacturing Company chairman Morris Chang flew to Hanoi as a special representative of then-President Chen Shui-bian to the Asia-Pacific Economic Cooperation forum. Unusually, Chang flew to Hanoi in Chen's presidential aircraft, a Boeing 737-800 operated by the Republic of China Air Force. The aircraft, which displays the flag of the Republic of China and its national emblem, had never before been permitted to land on the soil of a country with which Taiwan lacked formal relations.

== Investment ==
Foreign direct investment is an important policy tool of Taiwan; as Samuel Ku argues, Taipei uses "the island's economic resources in exchange for political gains from Vietnam". In the early days of doi moi, Vietnam was very interested in learning from Taiwan's experiences with small and medium enterprises in order to alleviate Vietnam's own chronic shortages of consumer goods. By 2006, Taiwan-based investors had poured US$8 billion into Vietnam, especially in equipment and buildings for conducting labour-intensive manufacturing in export processing zones. This scale of investment made Taiwan one of Vietnam's largest foreign investors.

== Movement of people ==
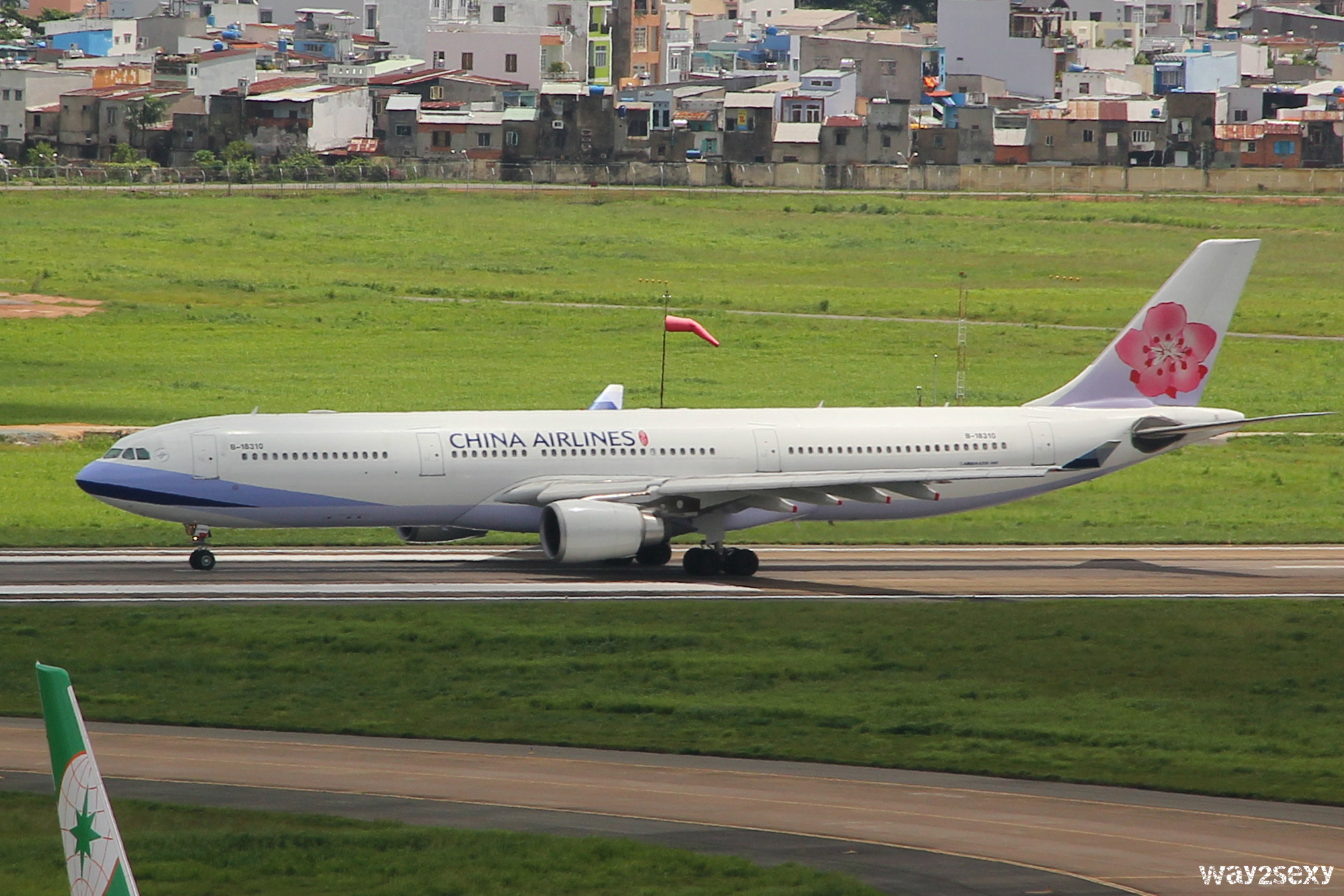
China Airlines Airbus A330 aircraft in Tan Son Nhat International Airport

There are tens of thousands of Taiwanese expatriates in Vietnam and Vietnamese people in Taiwan, mainly migrant workers.

== See also ==
- China–Vietnam relations
- Penghu Refugee Camp

== Bibliography ==
- An, Thomas S. (May 1967), "The Overseas Chinese in South Vietnam: A Note", Vietnam Perspectives, 2 (4): 13–19, JSTOR 30182506
- Chen, Jie (2002), Foreign policy of the New Taiwan: pragmatic diplomacy in Southeast Asia, Edward Elgar, ISBN 978-1-84064-635-1
- Chiu, Hsin-Hui (2008), The Colonial 'Civilizing Process' in Dutch Formosa: 1624–1662, vol. 10 of TANAP monographs on the history of the Asian-European interaction (illustrated ed.), BRILL, ISBN 978-9004165076
- Dang, Xuan Tanh (August 2011), "AEC, ECFA and Vietnam–Taiwan Economic Relations" (PDF), Taiwan–Vietnam Economic Cooperation: Moving Towards the 2015 Vision of ASEAN Economic Integration, archived from the original (PDF) on 2013-12-24
- Hoang, Anh Tuan (2007), Silk for Silver: Dutch–Vietnamese Relations, 1637–1700, vol. 5 of TANAP monographs on the history of the Asian-European interaction (illustrated ed.), BRILL, p. 210, ISBN 978-9004156012
- Ku, Samuel C. Y. (1999), "The Political Economy of Taiwan's Relations with Vietnam", Contemporary Southeast Asia, 21 (3): 405–423, doi:10.1355/CS21-3E (inactive 1 July 2025)
- Tran, Quang Minh (August 2011), "Two decades of Taiwan's FDI in Vietnam: An analysis" (PDF), Taiwan–Vietnam Economic Cooperation: Moving Towards the 2015 Vision of ASEAN Economic Integration, archived from the original (PDF) on 2013-12-24
- Lim, Jason (2014). "Confucianism as a Symbol of Solidarity: Cultural Relations between the Republic of China and the Republic of Vietnam, 1955-1963". Issues & Studies. 50 (4). doi:10.7033/ISE.201412_50(4).0005.
- Nguyễn Tuấn Cường (2016). "The Promotion of Confucianism in South Vietnam (1955–1975) and the Role of Nguyễn Đăng Thục as a New Confucian Scholar". Journal of Vietnamese Studies. 10 (4). doi:10.1525/jvs.2015.10.4.30.
