= Consulate General of Canada, Ho Chi Minh City =

Diplomatic mission of Canada in Vietnam

Consulate General of Canada in Ho Chi Minh City
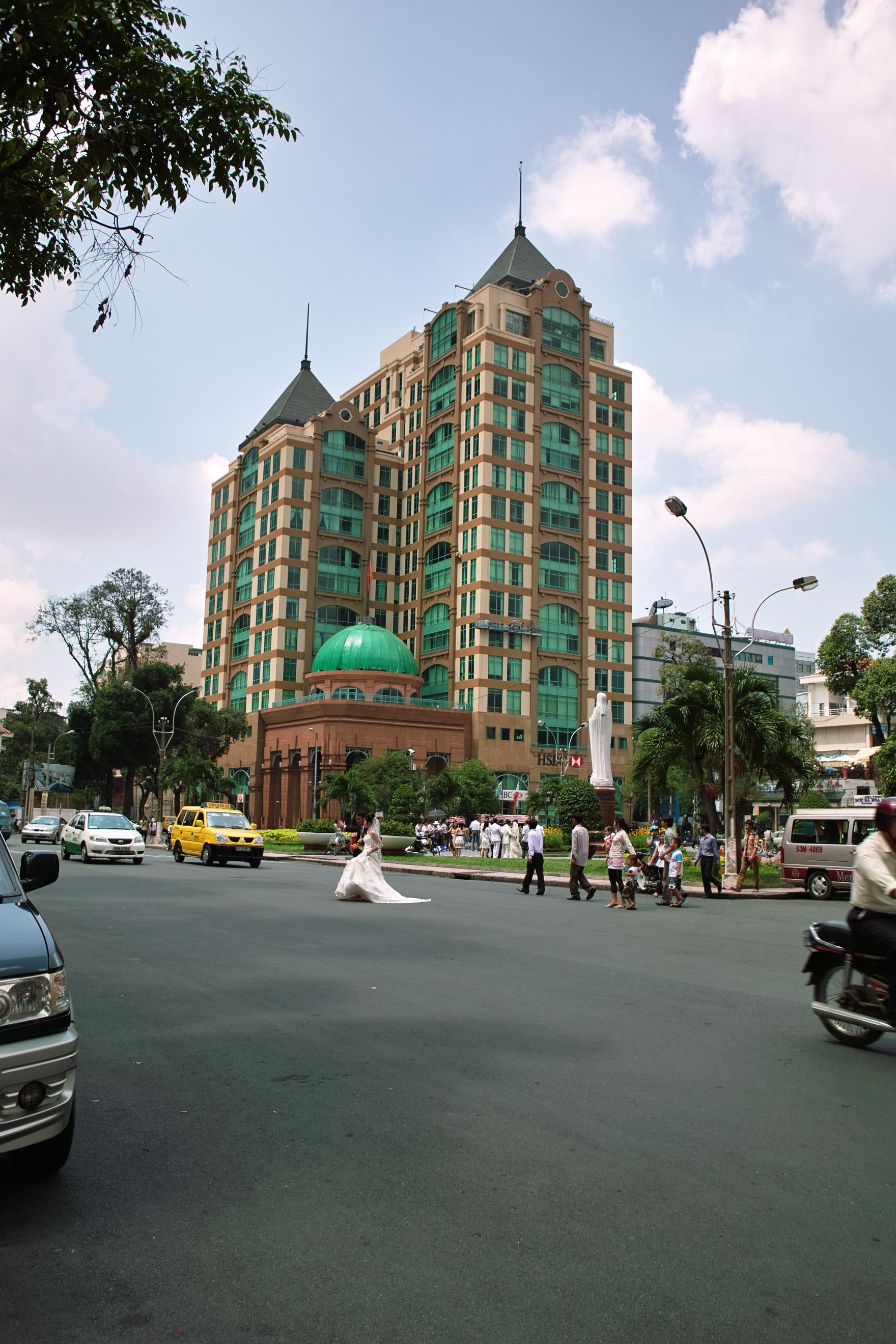
- Consul General: Kyle Nunas
- Website: Official Consulate website

The Consulate General of Canada in Ho Chi Minh City is located on the 10th Floor of Ho Chi Minh City's Metropolitan Building at 235 Đồng Khởi Street, in Saigon.

The Consulate General of Canada in Ho Chi Minh City provides consular services and manages Canada's diplomatic affairs in Ho Chi Minh City and southern Vietnam. This includes promoting Canada as a destination for trade and education, facilitating Canadian investment and trade, liaising with the Government of Vietnam on pertinent issues, and facilitating high-level Canadian visits to Vietnam, such as those of former Minister for the Asia-Pacific Gateway Stockwell Day, Nova Scotia Premier Darrell Dexter, Minister of International Trade Ed Fast, Minister of Foreign Affairs John Baird, and the Governor General of Canada, David Johnston.

The current Canadian Consul General in Ho Chi Minh City is Behzad Babakhani.

The Consulate General of Canada in Ho Chi Minh City is one of the organizers of Ho Chi Minh City's annual Terry Fox Run.

== See also ==
- List of diplomatic missions of Canada
- Foreign relations of Canada

== Heads of mission ==
- Consul General Annie Dubé (8/2023 - present)
- Consul General Behzad Babakhani (11/2020 - 8/2023)
- Consul General Kyle Nunas (8/2017 - 8/2020)
- Consul General Richard Bale (8/2015 – 8/2017)
- Consul General Wayne Robson (9/2013 – 8/2015)
- Consul General Audri Mukhopadhyay (8/2009 – 8/2013)
- Consul General Bill Johnston (8/2006 - 6/2009)
- Consul General Sanjeev Chowdhury (9/2003 - 8/2006)
- Consul General Judith St. George (9/2000 - 9/2003)
- Consul General Sara Hradecky (9/1997 - 9/2000)
- Consul General Ian Burney (9/1995 - 8/1997)
