= Taipei Representative Office, Bratislava =

Political representative office in Bratislava, Slovakia

- Taipejská reprezentačná kancelária, Bratislava 駐斯洛伐克臺北代表處
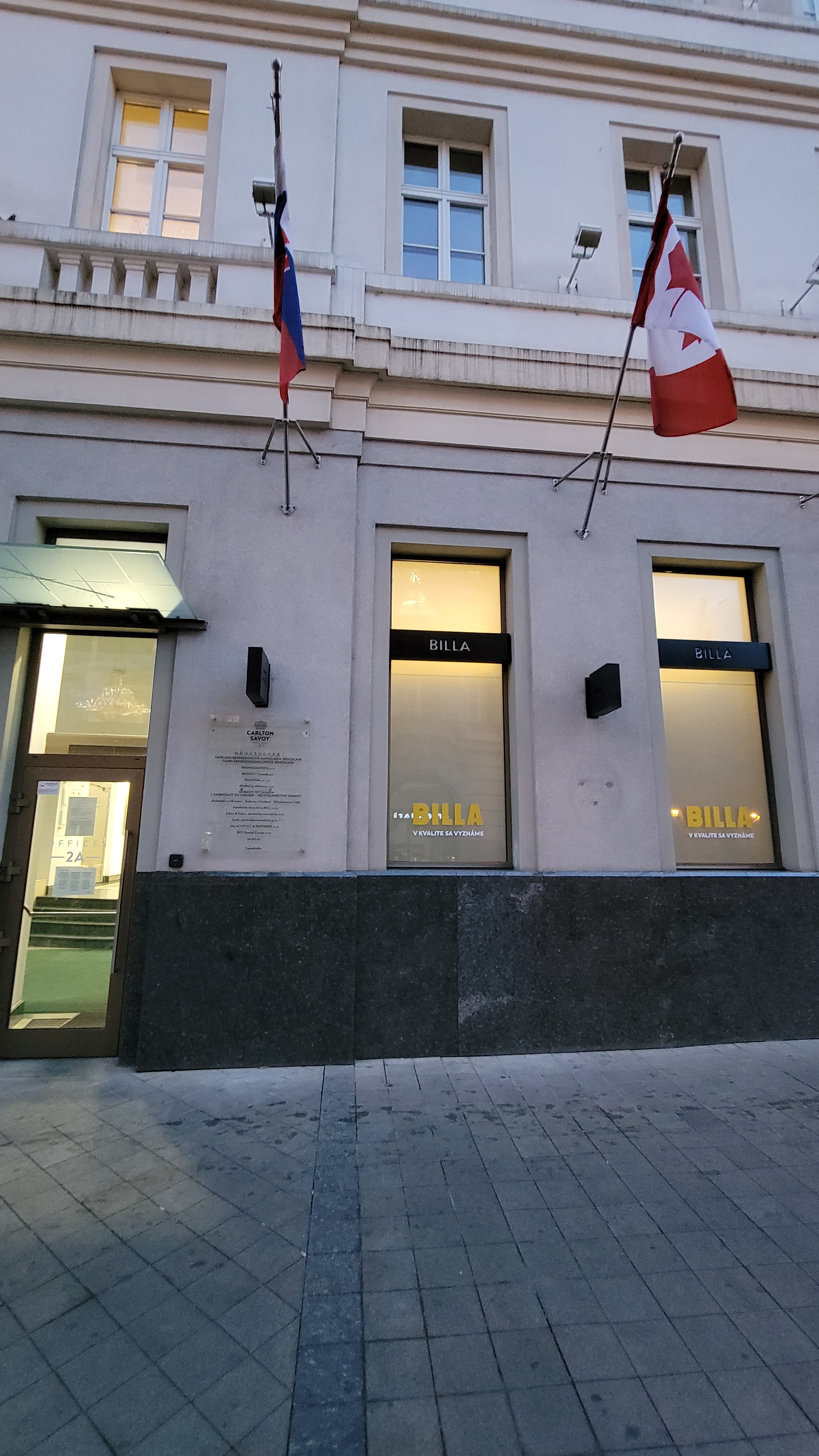
- Taipei Representative Office, Bratislava

Agency overview
- Formed: August 2003
- Jurisdiction: Slovakia; Romania
- Headquarters: Mostová 185/2, Old Town, Bratislava, Slovakia
- Agency executive: David Nan-yang Lee, Representative
- Website: Official website

The Taipei Representative Office, Bratislava (Chinese: 駐斯洛伐克臺北代表處; pinyin: Zhù Sīluòfkè Táiběi dài biǎo chǔ; Slovak: Taipejská reprezentačná kancelária, Bratislava) represents the interests of Taiwan in the Slovakia in the absence of formal diplomatic relations, functioning as a de facto embassy. Its counterpart is the Slovak Economic and Cultural Office in Taipei, which was established in September 2003.

== Background ==
The aim of the representative office is to further bilateral cooperation between Slovakia and Taiwan in the fields of economics, culture, education and research. In addition, it offers consular services and the consular jurisdiction of the office also extends to Romania.

Following the dissolution of Czechoslovakia in 1992, the Taipei Economic and Cultural Office in Prague was assigned to the Czech Republic. On 1 August 2003, the Ministry of Foreign Affairs of the Republic of China established the representative office in the Slovak capital city of Bratislava, and at the same time also established business and economic groups for responsibility in related affairs. Following the opening of the office, the spokesperson of the Ministry of Foreign Affairs of the People's Republic of China issued a statement stating that "Chinese Government is resolutely opposed to any official relations or exchanges between Taiwan and countries having diplomatic ties with China" and that "any attempt to destroy the friendly relations between China and Slovak[ia] will get nowhere."

As of 2020, the office is headed by a representative, currently David Nan-yang Lee, who previously served as the representative of Taipei Representative Office in Ireland.

== See also ==
- Slovakia–Taiwan relations
- List of diplomatic missions of Taiwan
- List of diplomatic missions in Slovakia
