= Slovakia–Taiwan relations =

- Slovakia: Taiwan

Diplomatic mission
- Slovak Economic and Cultural Office in Taipei: Taipei Representative Office in Slovakia

Slovakia–Taiwan relations refers to bilateral relations between Taiwan and Slovakia. Slovakia does not officially extend diplomatic recognition to Taiwan although it is exploring possible ways to do so. Slovakia has strengthened its engagement with Taiwan during the 2020s and bilateral relations have improved.

Slovak interests in Taiwan are represented by the Slovak Economic and Cultural Office Taipei. Taiwanese interests in Slovakia are represented by the Taipei Representative Office in Slovakia.

== History ==
The Slovak Economic and Cultural Office Taipei was opened in 2001. This was followed by the opening of the Taipei Representative Office in Bratislava in August 2003, which represents Taiwan's interests in Slovakia and also serves Romania.

Over the following years, the relationship expanded through the signing of multiple bilateral agreements. In the early 2000s, Slovakia and Taiwan signed several memoranda of understanding. In April 2015, a scientific and technological cooperation agreement was signed.

Martin Podstavek assumed the role of Slovak representative in Taiwan in 2017. During his tenure, he significantly strengthened bilateral cooperation, especially in economic, academic, and health diplomacy. In 2022, Podstavek was awarded the Taiwanese Grand Medal of Diplomacy in recognition of his contributions.

In 2021, the Foreign Affairs Committee of the National Council of Slovakia passed a resolution to support the attendance of Taiwan at the World Health Assembly. The resolution was recognized and praised by Taiwan's Ministry of Foreign Affairs.

== Trade ==
Taiwan and Slovakia held trade talks in 2021. In 2023, bilateral trade totaled approximately $913 million. Slovakia exported around $290 million in goods to Taiwan. Taiwan exported roughly $623 million in goods to Slovakia. Over the last decades the volume of bilateral trade has increased.

Cars have constantly been the dominant product of Slovakia's exports to Taiwan. Slovakia's car exports to Taiwan reached $227M in 2023. Taiwan mainly exported broadcasting equipment ($116M), integrated circuits ($95.6M), and computers ($76.4M) to Slovakia.

== Mutual aid ==
During the early part of the COVID-19 pandemic, Taiwan donated masks to Slovakia. Later in the pandemic, Slovakia reciprocated with 150,000 doses of AstraZeneca COVID vaccines.

After the Russian invasion of Ukraine in February 2022, Taiwan collaborated extensively with Slovakia to support humanitarian efforts amidst the Ukrainian refugee crisis. Taiwan dispatched hundreds of tonnes of medical and humanitarian aid destined for Ukrainian refugees in Slovakia. Slovak Representative Bruno Hromy described Taiwan as a “true friend” in alleviating the refugee burden.

== See also ==
- Foreign relations of Slovakia
- Foreign relations of Taiwan
