= Czech Republic–Taiwan relations =

- Czech Republic: Taiwan

Diplomatic mission
- Czech Economic and Cultural Office in Taipei: Taipei Economic and Cultural Office, Prague

Envoy
- Representative David Steinke: Representative Liang-ruey Ke

The Czech Republic and Taiwan (officially the Republic of China) have maintained strong unofficial relations.

In the absence of official diplomatic relations, the Czech Republic is represented by the Czech Economic and Cultural Office in Taipei, and Taiwan by the Taipei Economic and Cultural Office in Prague.

== Diplomatic exchanges ==
In 1994, Czech Republic Minister of the Economy Karel Dyba became the first sitting government minister to visit Taiwan.

Jaroslav Kubera, President of the Senate of the Czech Republic, planned a visit to Taipei prior to his death, prompting threats of retaliation from China's Ministry of Foreign Affairs. Kubera's successor, Miloš Vystrčil, however, led a delegation to Taiwan that arrived in Taipei on August 31, 2020. While there, Vystrčil gave a speech, declaring "I am a Taiwanese," echoing John F. Kennedy's famous "I am a Berliner" speech. The People's Republic of China said that Vystrčil would "pay a heavy price" for visiting what it considers to be a "renegade province". Meanwhile, the President of the Czech Republic Miloš Zeman said of the trip that "I consider it boyish provocation."

In late October 2021, Taiwan's foreign minister Joseph Wu received a medal from the President of the Czech Senate Miloš Vystrčil.

In July 2022, You Si-kun, the President of the Taiwan's Legislative Yuan, led a delegation to visit the Czech Republic. He also delivered a speech at the Czech Senate, declaring "I am Taiwanese; I am Czech, because we are both believers of democracy."

Ties appeared to deepen in 2023 when the Czech Republic's President-elect Petr Pavel spoke with Taiwan's President Tsai Ing-wen. In March a 150-member delegation headed by President of the Chamber of Deputies Markéta Pekarová Adamová visited Taiwan. In June Hsu Tzong-li, the President of Taiwan's Judicial Yuan, visited the Czech Republic and met with his counterpart Pavel Rychetsky, the President of the Constitutional Court of the Czech Republic.

In March 2024, Taiwanese vice president-elect Hsiao Bi-khim was invited by think tank Sinopsis to visit the Czech Republic. She stopped in Prague following a trip to the United States and met with Miloš Vystrčil.

In October 2024, former Taiwanese president Tsai Ing-wen visited the Czech Republic and delivered a speech at the Forum 2000, during which she met with Czech president Petr Pavel, Czech Senate president Miloš Vystrčil, and president of the Chamber of Deputies Markéta Pekarová.

In April 2026, Czech Prime Minister Andrej Babiš said the Czech government would not provide a plane for Senate President Miloš Vystrčil to travel to Taiwan to not damage business ties with China, and criticized Vystrčil's previous visits as having "destroyed business". In the same month, the Czech government denied requests for Taiwan to let President Lai Ching-te to fly through Czech airspace en route to a potential visit to Eswatini.

== Trade and economic relations ==
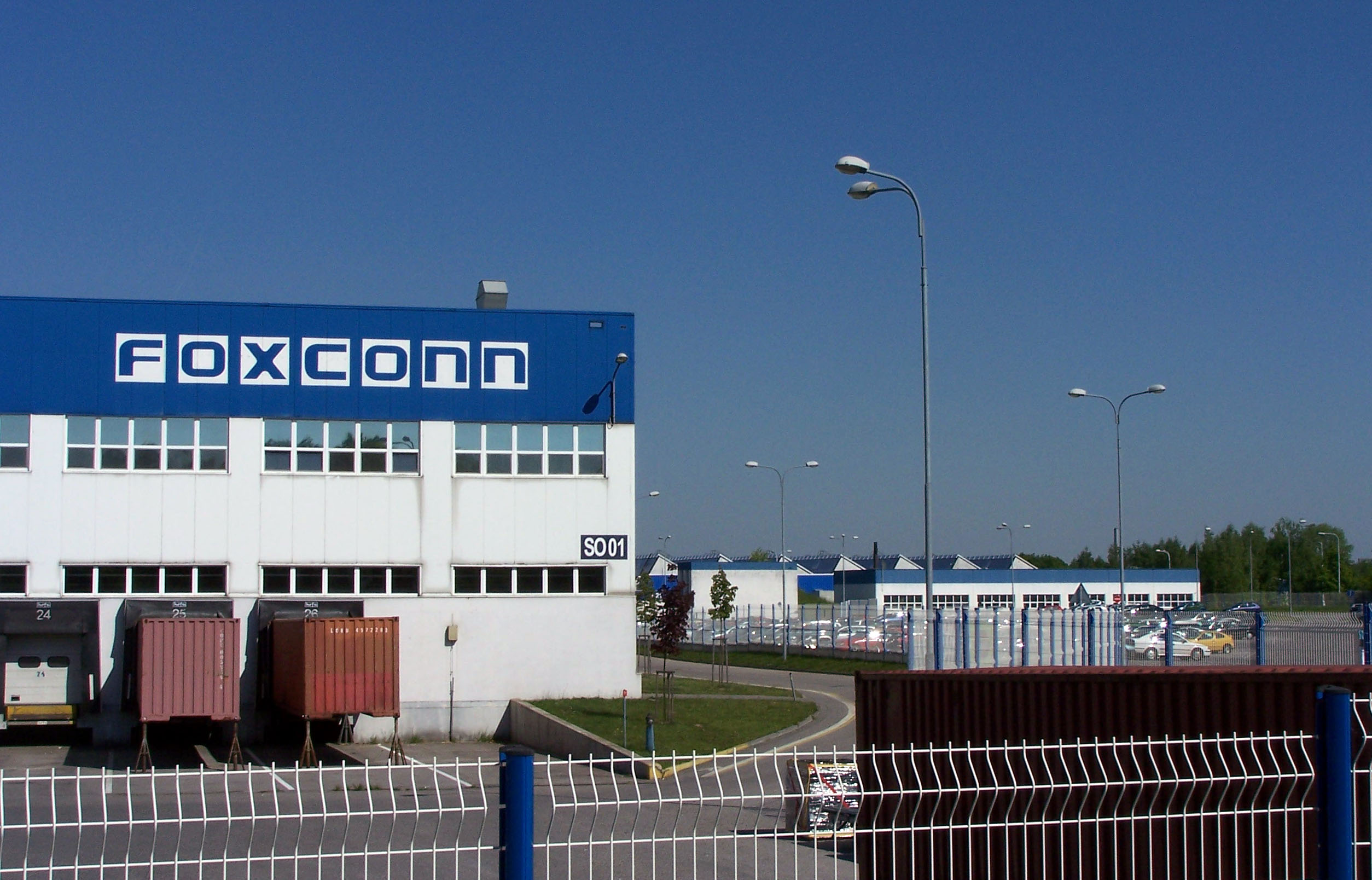
Entrance of the Foxconn CZ plant in Pardubice

Taiwanese electronics manufacturer Foxconn runs its largest European operations in the Czech Republic, the company's European Union (EU) hub. The subsidiary, named Foxconn CZ, is by profit one of largest companies in the Czech Republic.

In August 2020, Czech Senate President Miloš Vystrčil traveled to Taiwan on an official visit to "promote business links" between the two countries.

As part of the Business Opportunities Promotion Plan, CzechInvest opened its Taipei office in May 2024, and the Czech Centre Taipei held its ceremony in June.

In August-September 2024, Taiwanese National Security Council secretary-general Joseph Wu led a delegation to the GLOBSEC Forum held in Prague. He stated in a news conference that Taiwan was planning a semiconductor cluster in the Czech Republic. Separately in Taipei, the National Development Council made a statement that the Czech Chamber of Deputies proposed providing tax incentives to support Taiwanese investments in the Czech semiconductor industry.

In September 2024, the Taiwanese foreign ministry announced a joint Czech-Taiwanese semiconductor research center. The bilateral initiative includes a supply chain research center jointly managed by Charles University and National Chengchi University. Taiwanese economic minister J.W. Kuo visited the Czech Republic in December 2024 to promote industrial cooperation between the two countries. He witnessed the signing of a memorandum of understanding pledging to set up a trade and investment service hub in Prague, and he met with Senate President Vystrčil and other officials to discuss bilateral economic exchanges.

== Humanitarian aid ==
In 2022, following the Russian invasion of Ukraine, the Taiwanese government donated US$1 million to Czech nonprofit group People in Need to provide services and assistance to displaced Ukrainian children in the Czech Republic.

In February 2025, People in Need and the Taiwanese foreign ministry signed a memorandum of understanding to assist Ukrainian refugees in the Czech Republic. The memorandum established a joint project in which People in Need would provide shelter for young Ukrainians fleeing the ongoing Russo-Ukrainian War.

== Sports ==
In the lead-up to the 2024 WBSC Premier12, the national teams of the two countries played two warm-up games at Taipei Dome. As friendly gestures, Czech player Marek Chlup walked onto the field draped in the Taiwanese flag, while Taiwanese captain Chen Chieh-hsien carried the Czech flag.

== Public health cooperation ==
In March 2020, the Czech Republic and Taiwan signed an official partnership to fight COVID-19, the first such agreement signed by Taiwan.

In April 2021, Taiwan's foreign ministry thanked the Czech Republic for supporting Taiwan's bid to participate in World Health Assembly. The Czech Senate unanimously passed a resolution calling for Taiwan to take part in all divisions of the World Health Organization. It's the first time such a motion has progressed in a legislative chamber in the country.

After the 2021 South Moravia tornado, Taiwan donated 6.5 million Czech koruna to the affected villages.

In August 2021, Taiwan received 30,000 doses of Moderna vaccine donated by Czech Republic.

== Prague–Taipei relations ==
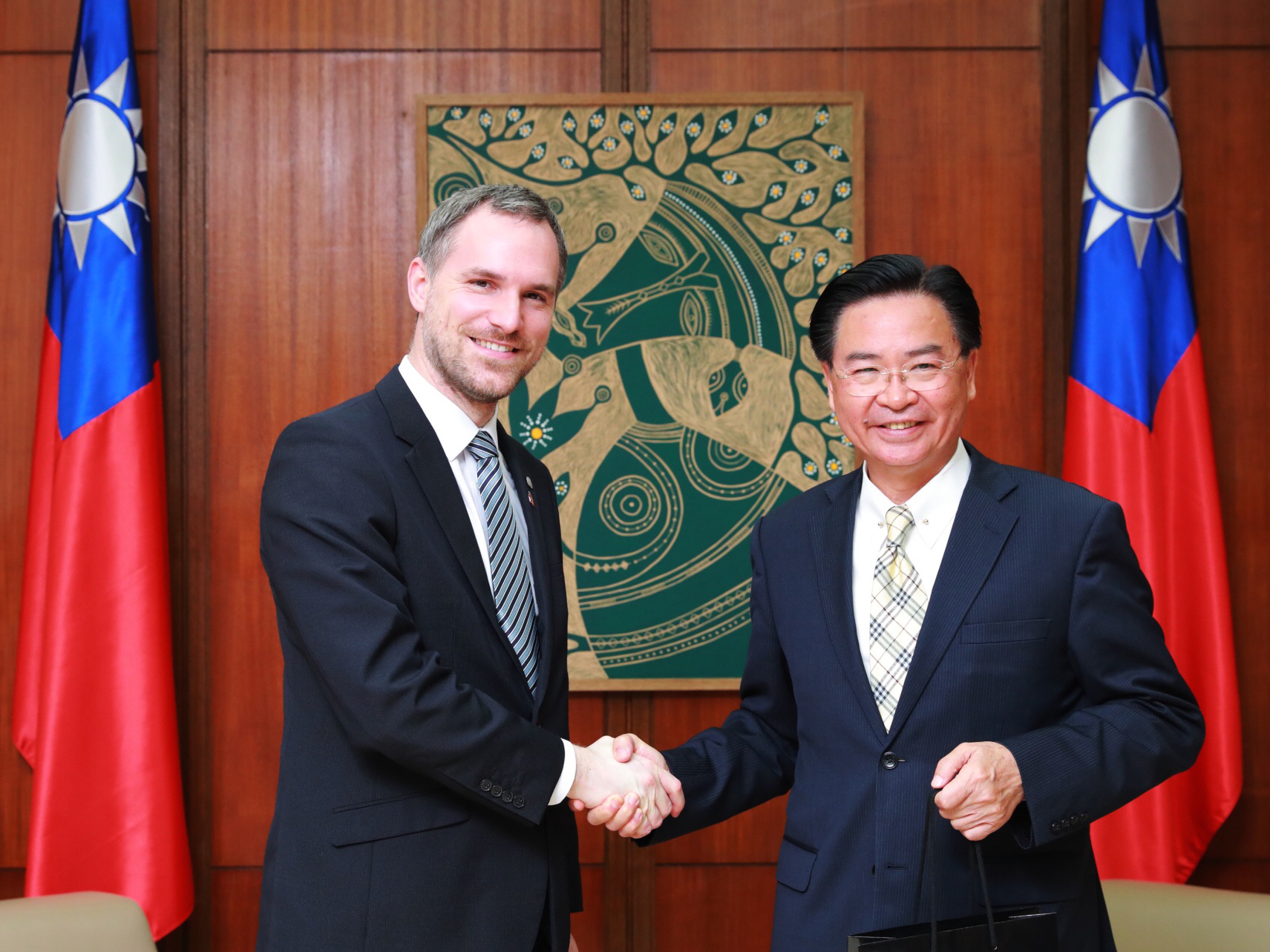
Mayor of Prague Zdeněk Hřib and Minister of Foreign Affairs of Taiwan Joseph Wu on 1 April 2019

In August 1968, the Republic of China (Taiwan) was among the ten members of the United Nations Security Council to condemn the Warsaw Pact invasion of Czechoslovakia led by the Soviet Union, the latter of whom opposed the resolution.

In 2019, Czech Republic–Taiwan relations warmed when the Prague city council under Mayor Zdeněk Hřib voted to cancel sister city relations with Beijing due to the unwillingness of Beijing to renegotiate the inclusion of a "One-China policy" clause. While respecting the policy itself, Prague deemed inappropriate to express national policy in a sister city agreement. On January 13, 2020, Prague and Taipei became sister cities.

== See also ==
- Foreign relations of Taiwan
- Foreign relations of the Czech Republic
- List of diplomatic missions of the Czech Republic
