= List of diplomatic missions in Slovakia =

This article lists diplomatic missions resident in Slovakia. At present, the capital city of Bratislava hosts 47 embassies. Several other countries have missions accredited from other capitals, mostly in Vienna, Prague and Berlin.

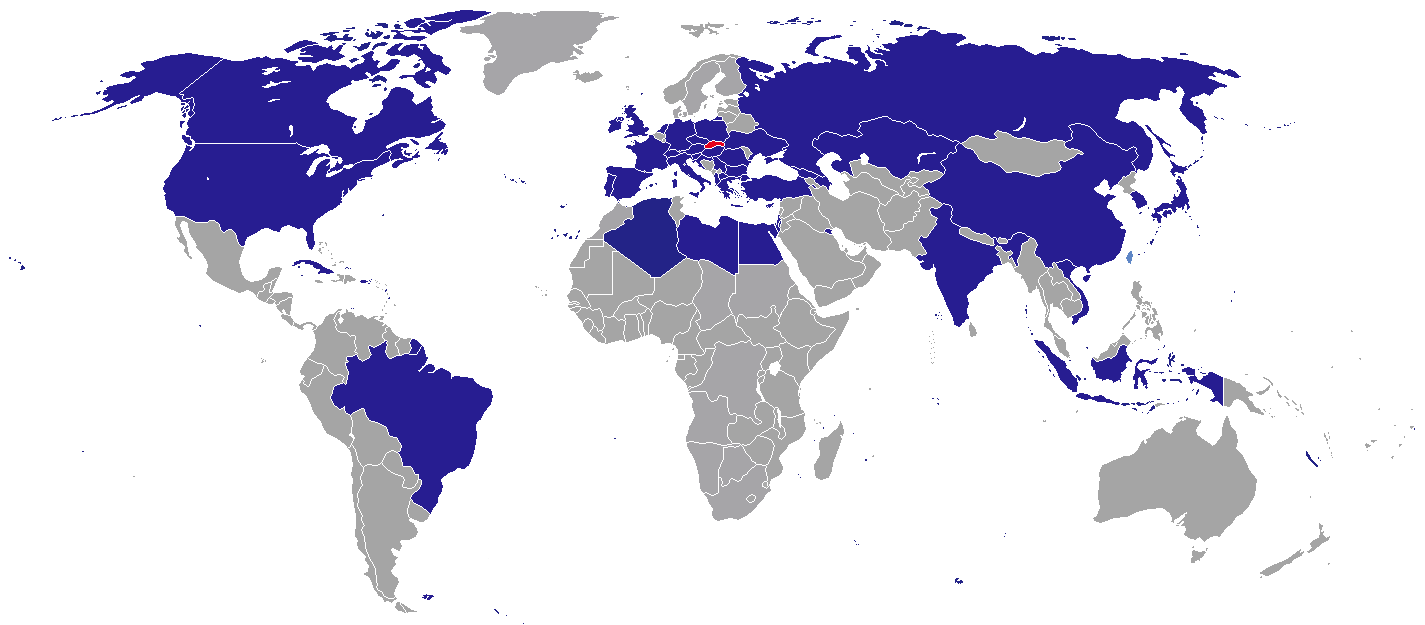
Map of diplomatic missions in Slovakia

== Diplomatic missions in Bratislava ==
=== Embassies ===
1. Albania
2. Algeria
3. Austria
4. Azerbaijan
5. Belarus
6. Brazil
7. Bulgaria
8. Canada
9. China
10. Croatia
11. Cuba
12. Cyprus
13. Czechia
14. Egypt
15. France
16. Germany
17. Georgia
18. Greece
19. Holy See
20. Hungary
21. India
22. Indonesia
23. Ireland
24. Israel
25. Italy
26. Japan
27. Kazakhstan
28. Kuwait
29. Libya
30. Netherlands
31. North Macedonia
32. Palestine
33. Poland
34. Portugal
35. Romania
36. Russia
37. Serbia
38. Slovenia
39. South Korea
40. Sovereign Military Order of Malta
41. Spain
42. Switzerland
43. Turkey
44. Ukraine
45. United Kingdom
46. United States
47. Vietnam

=== Other missions or delegations ===
- Republic of China (Taiwan) (Representative office)

=== Gallery ===
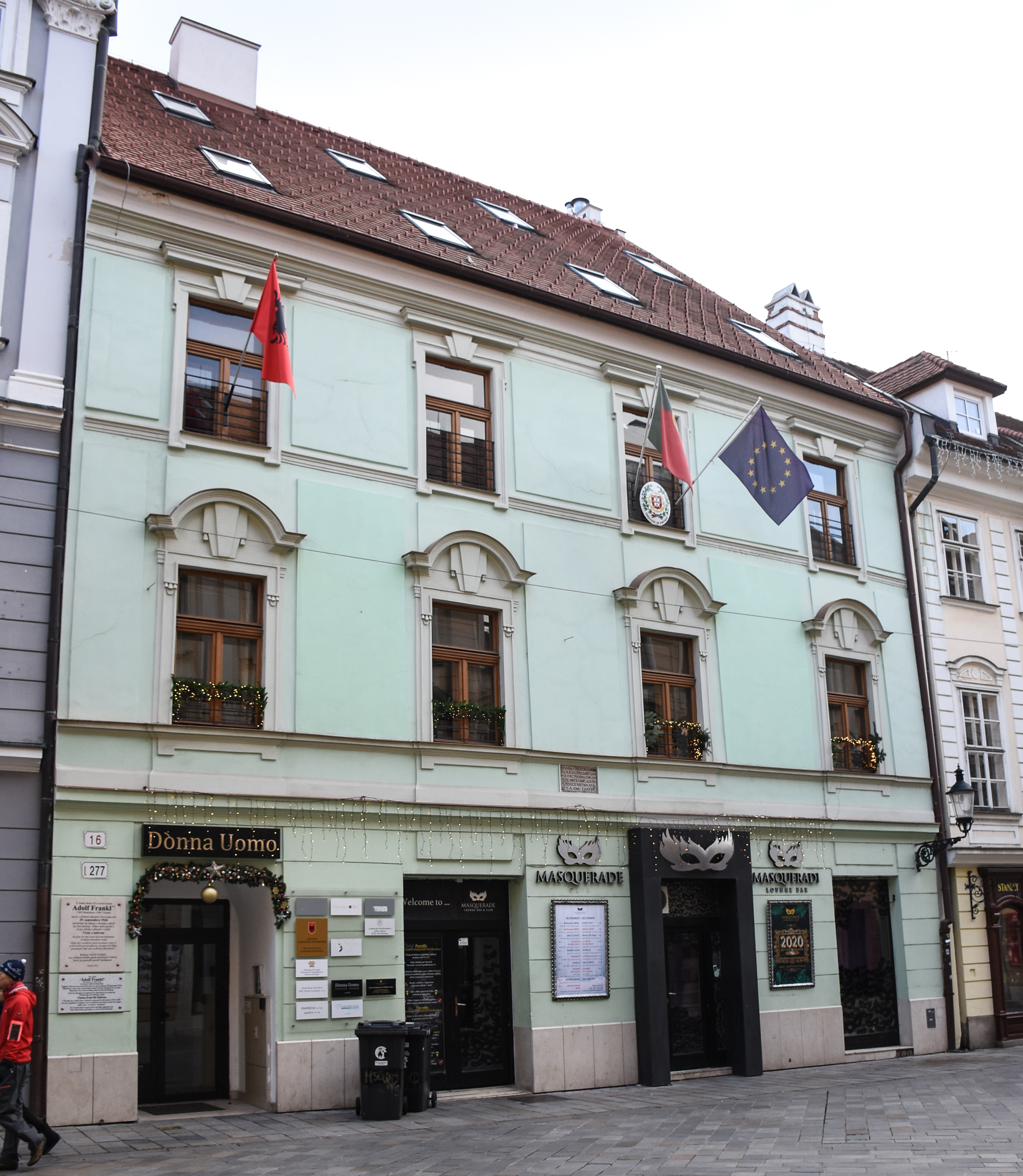
Embassies of Albania and Portugal

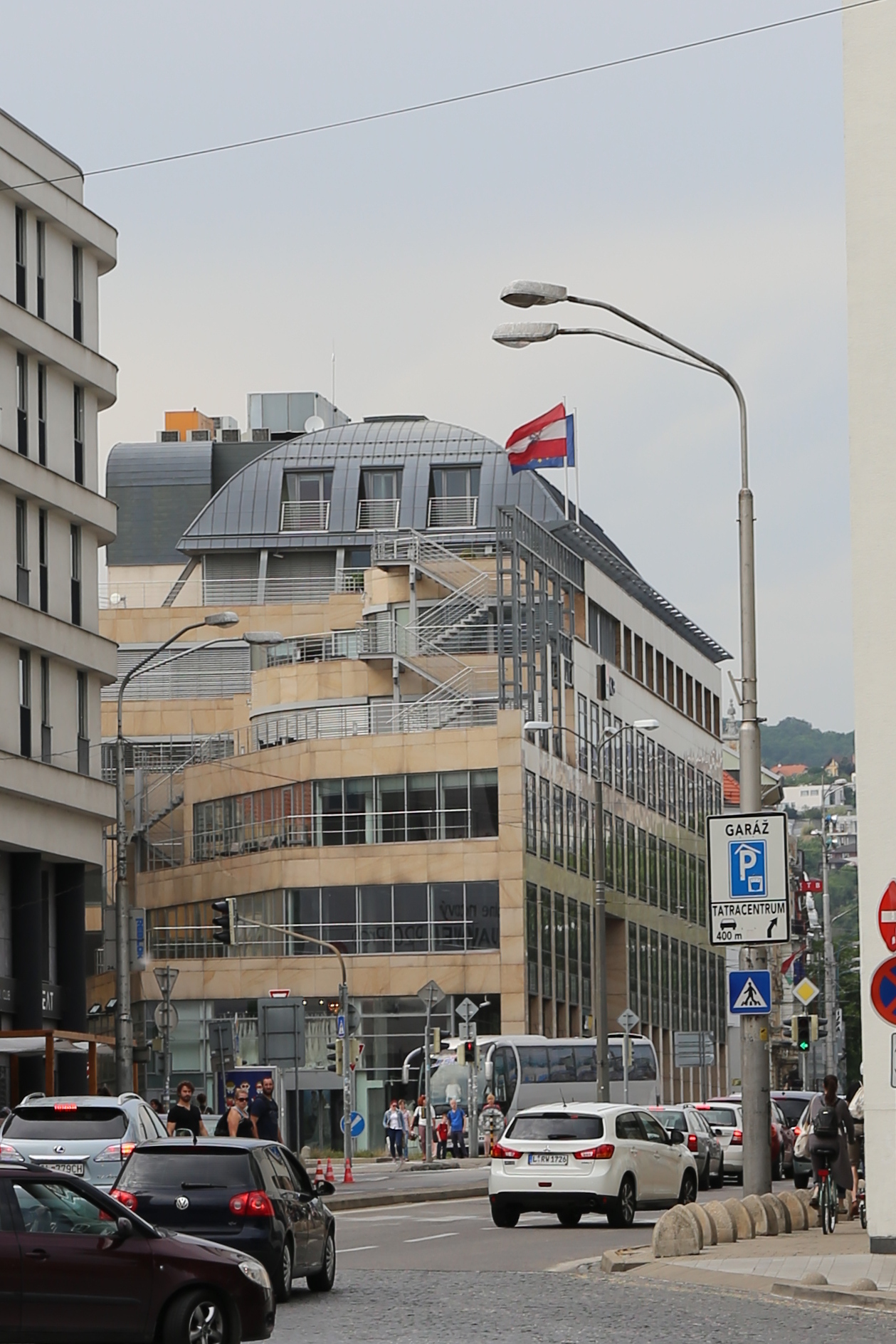
Embassy of Austria

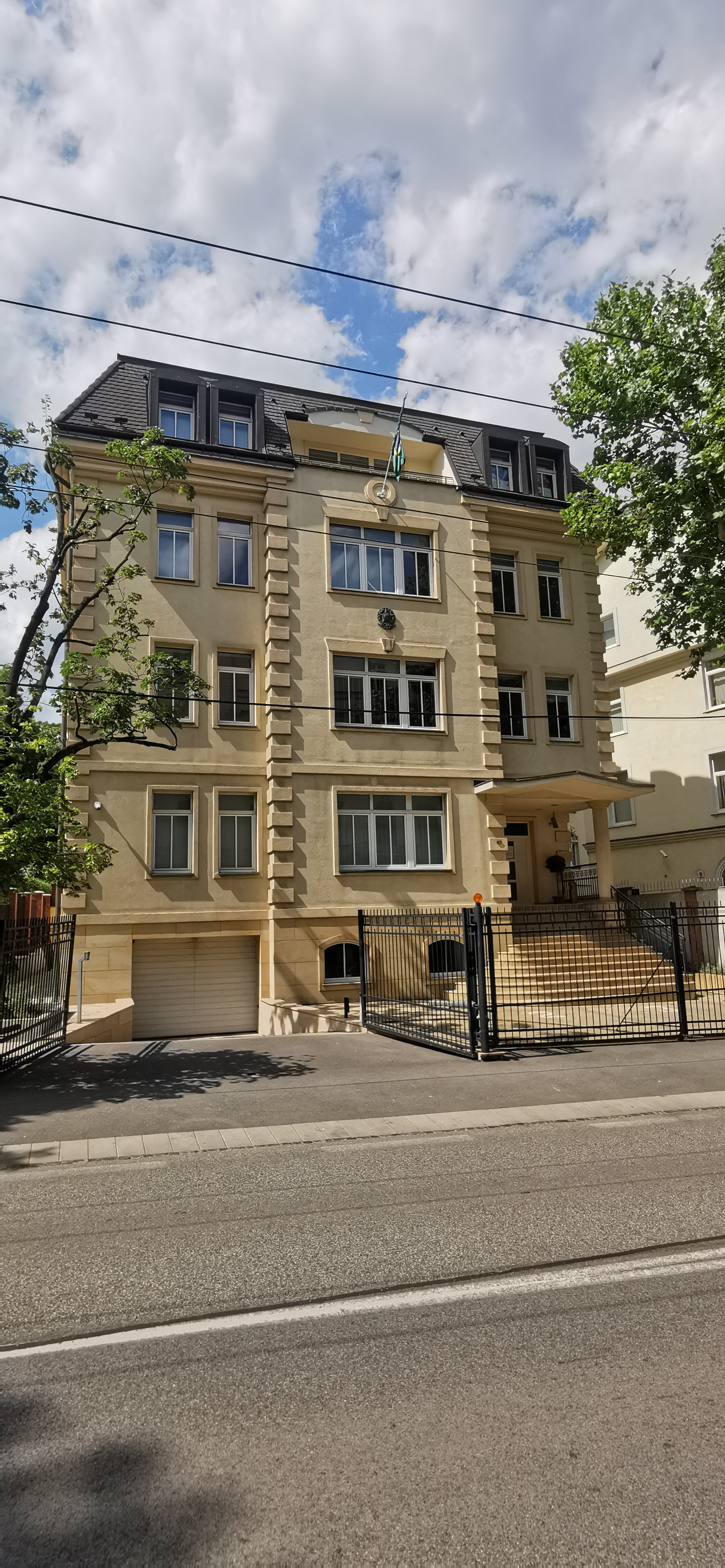
Embassy of Brazil

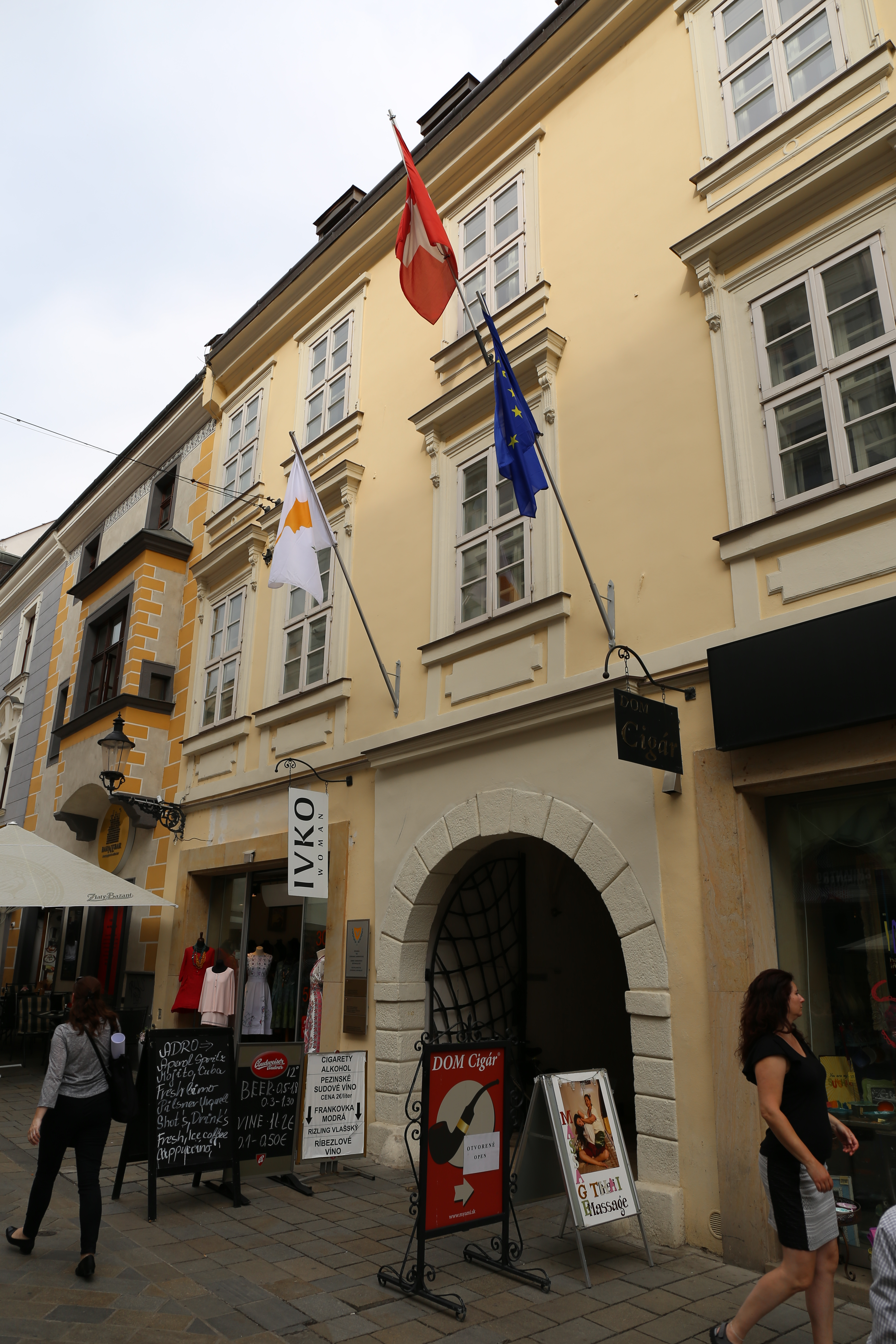
Embassies of Cyprus and Switzerland

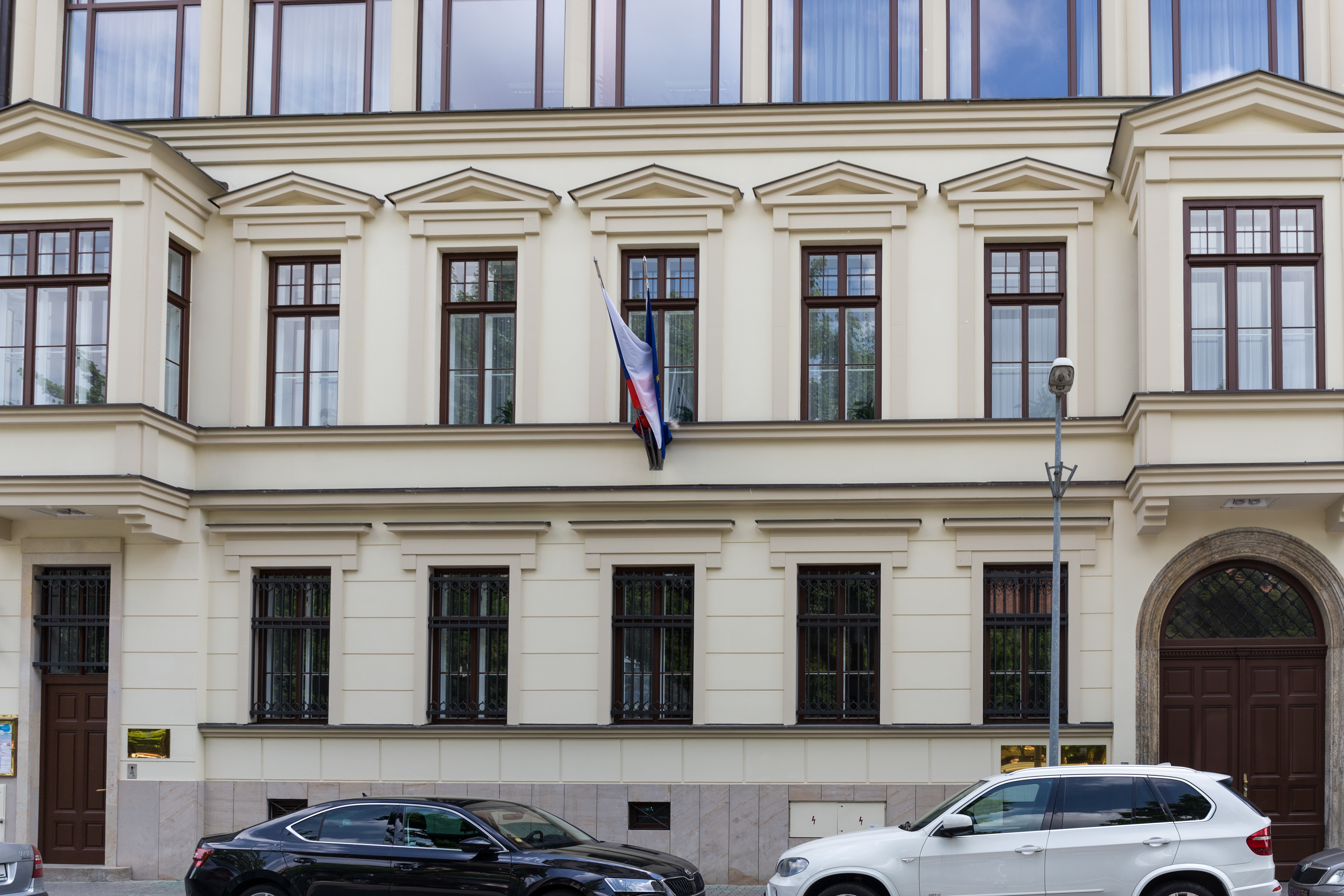
Embassy of the Czech Republic

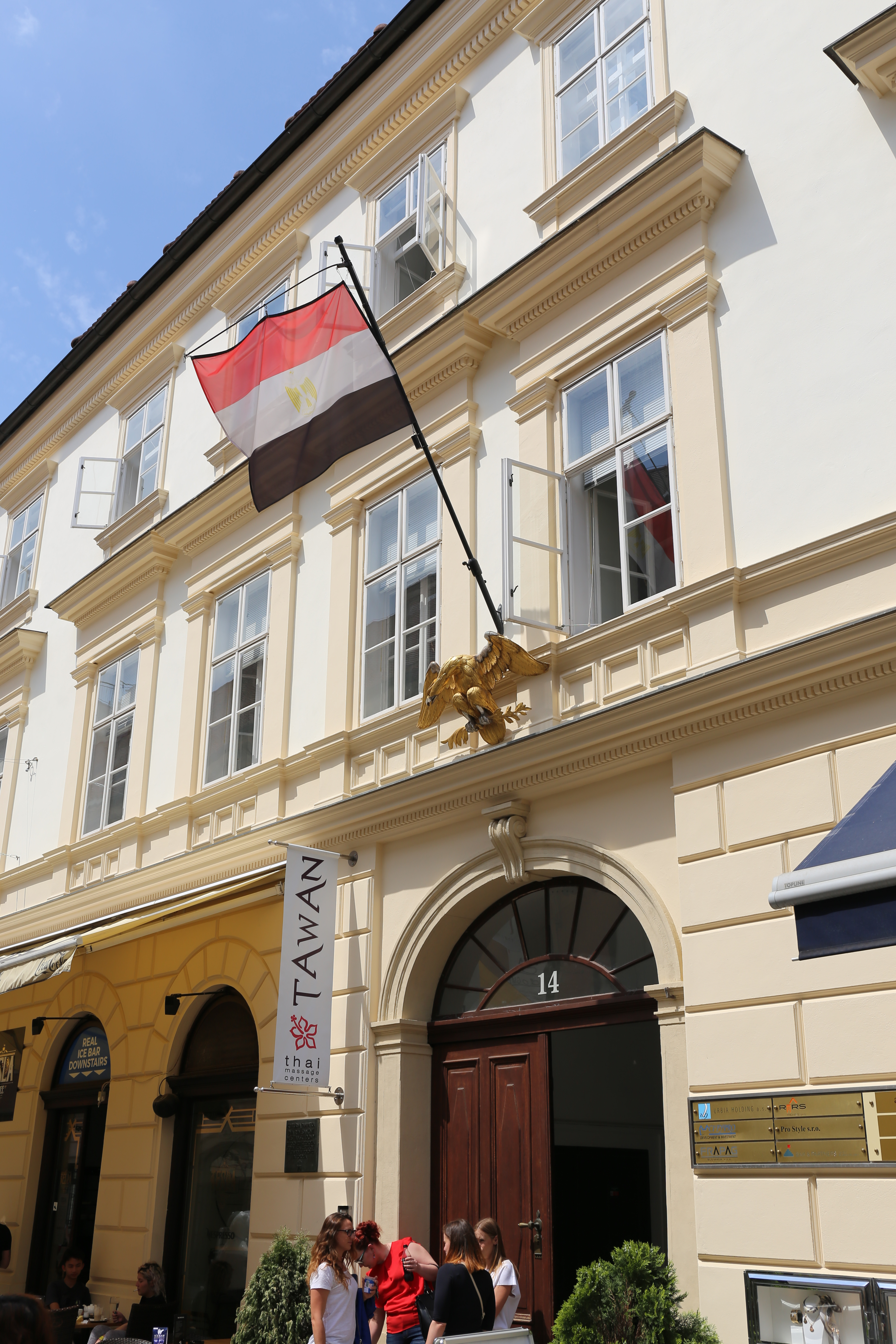
Embassy of Egypt

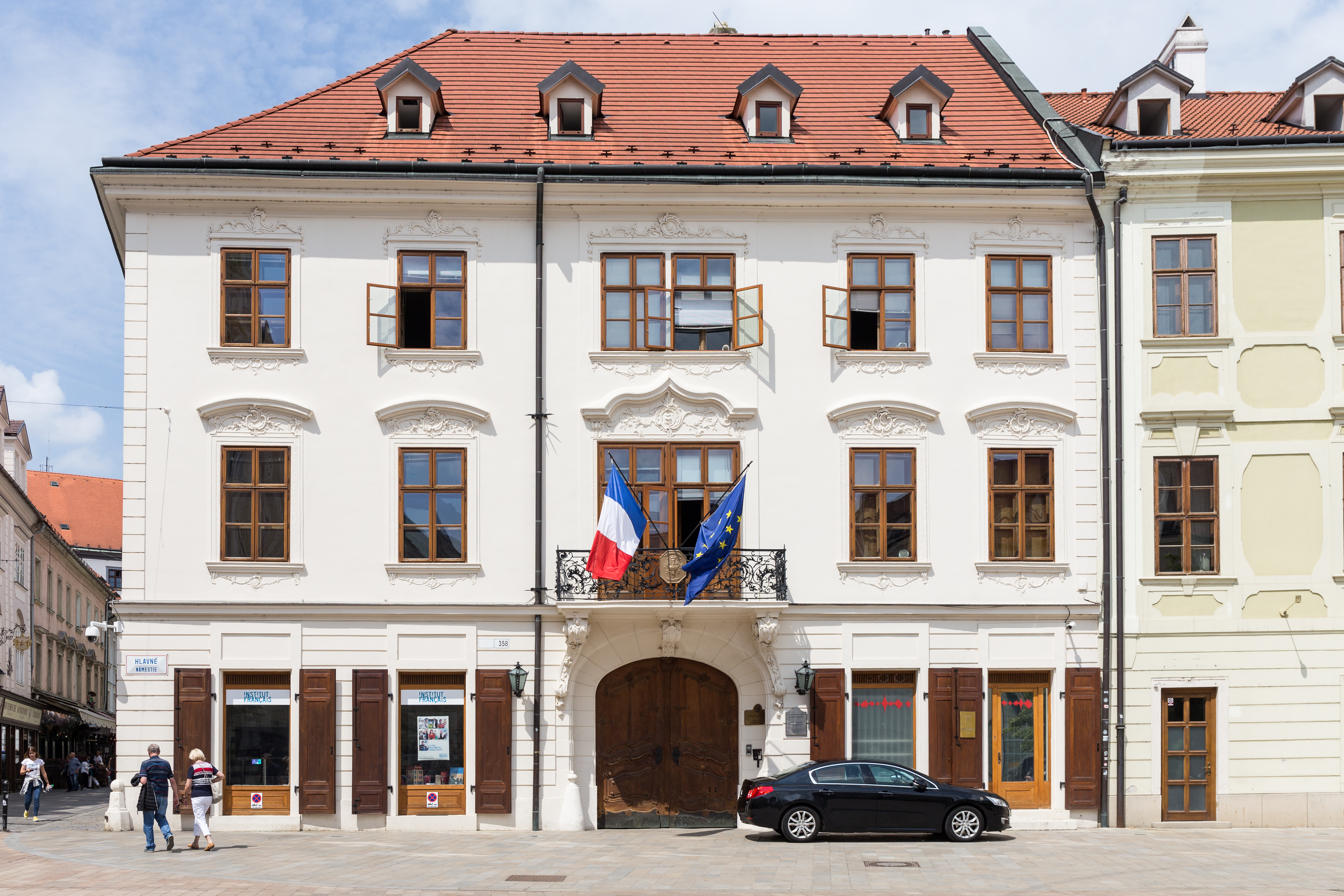
Embassy of France

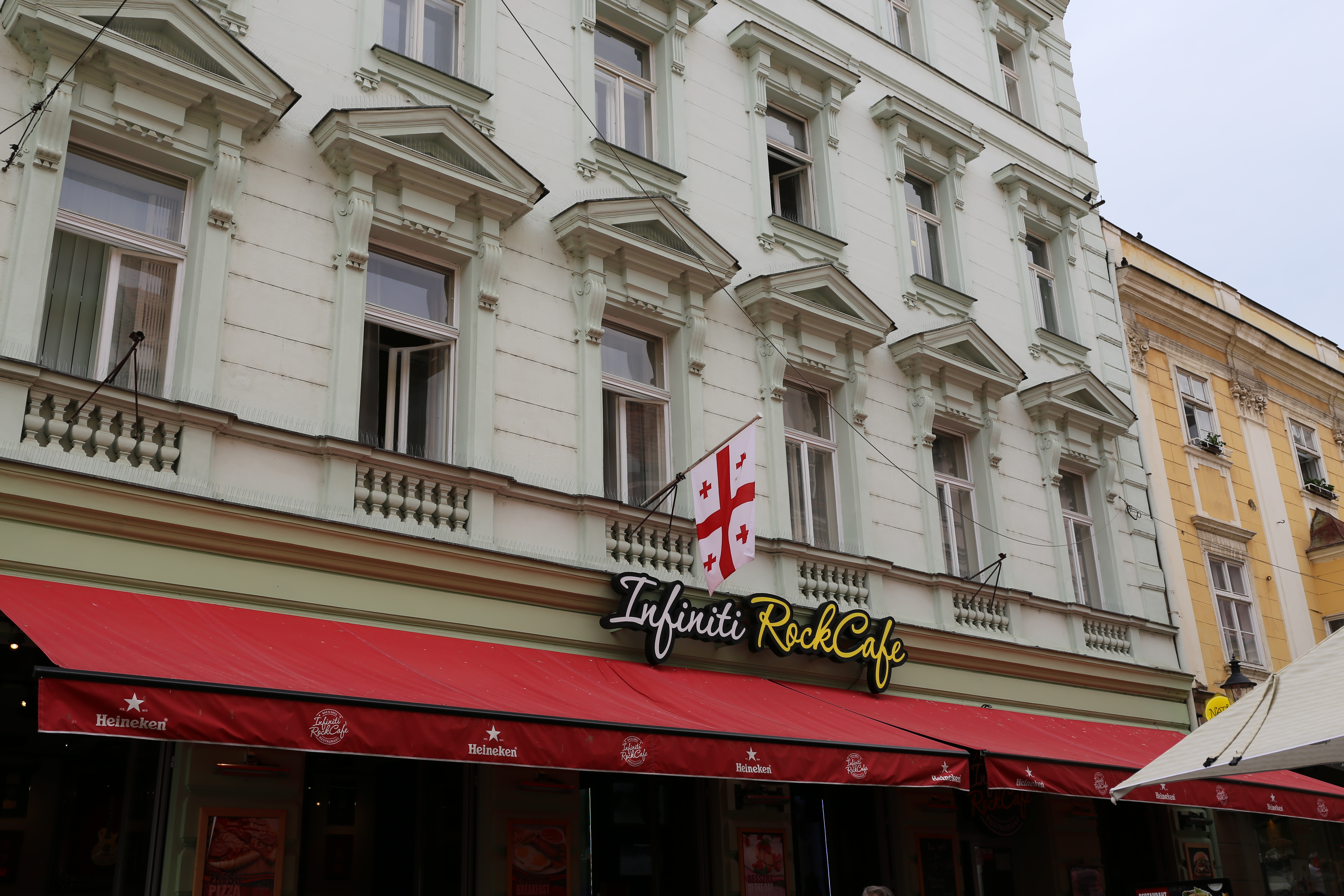
Embassy of Georgia

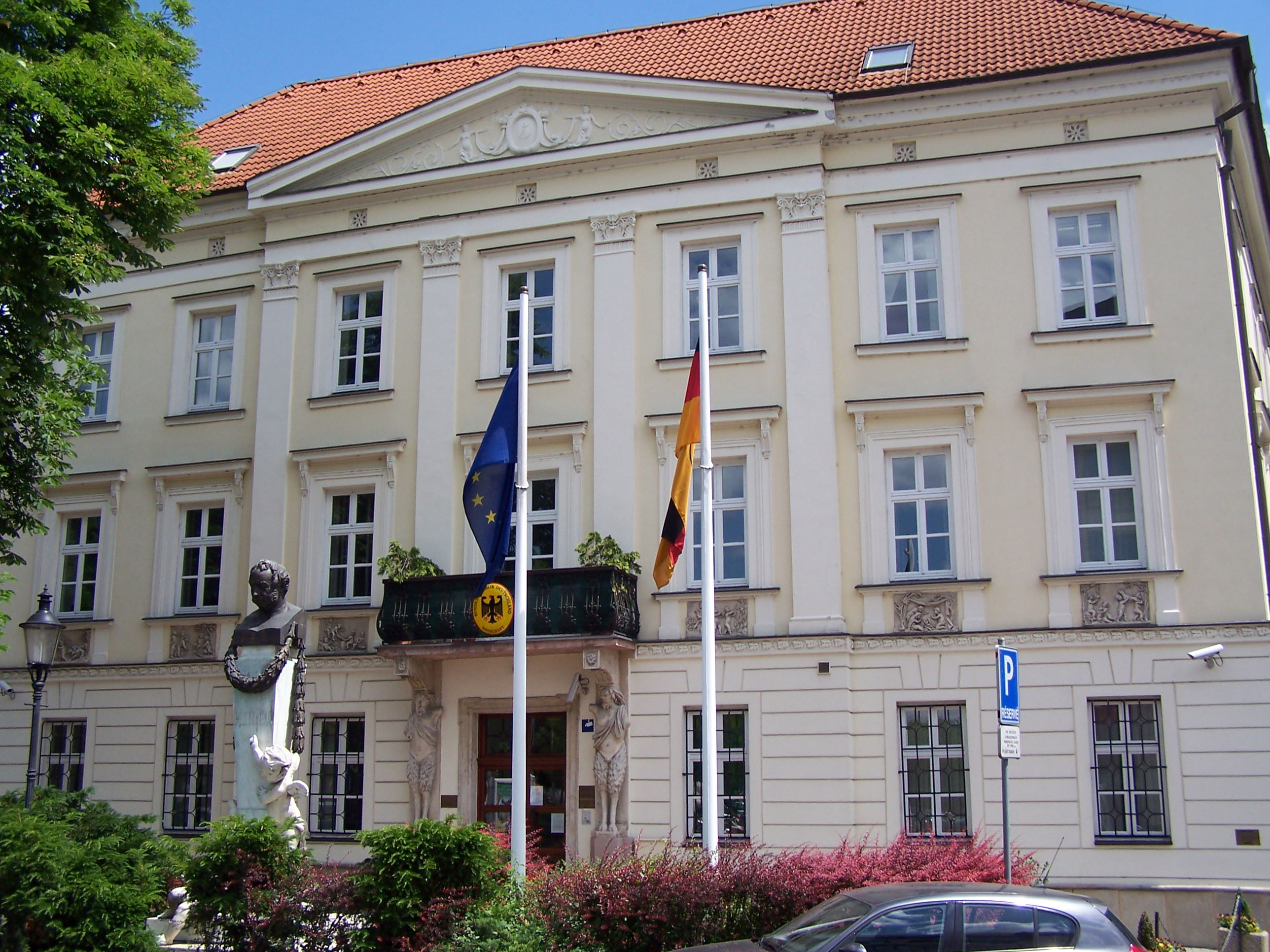
Embassy of Germany

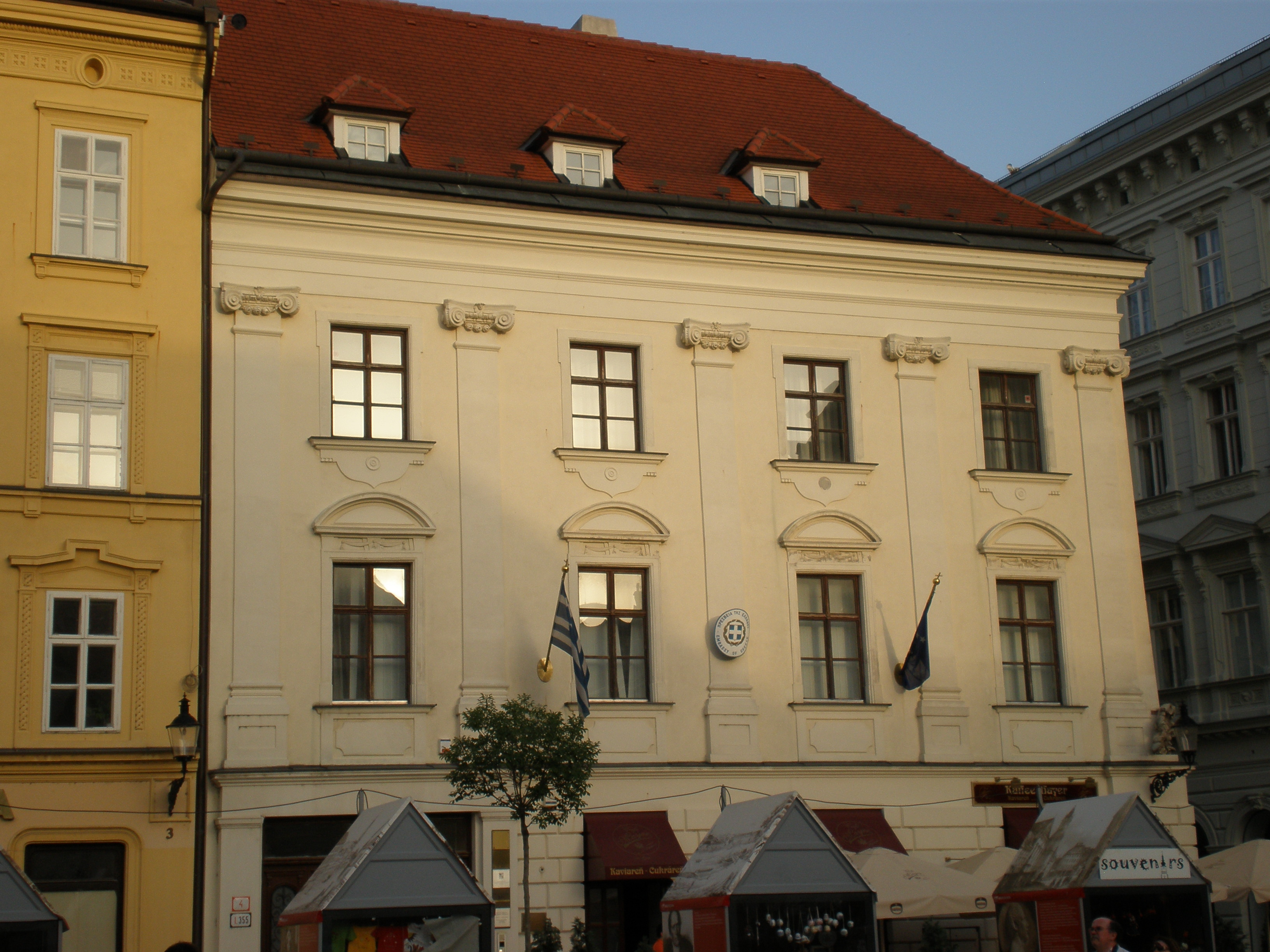
Embassy of Greece

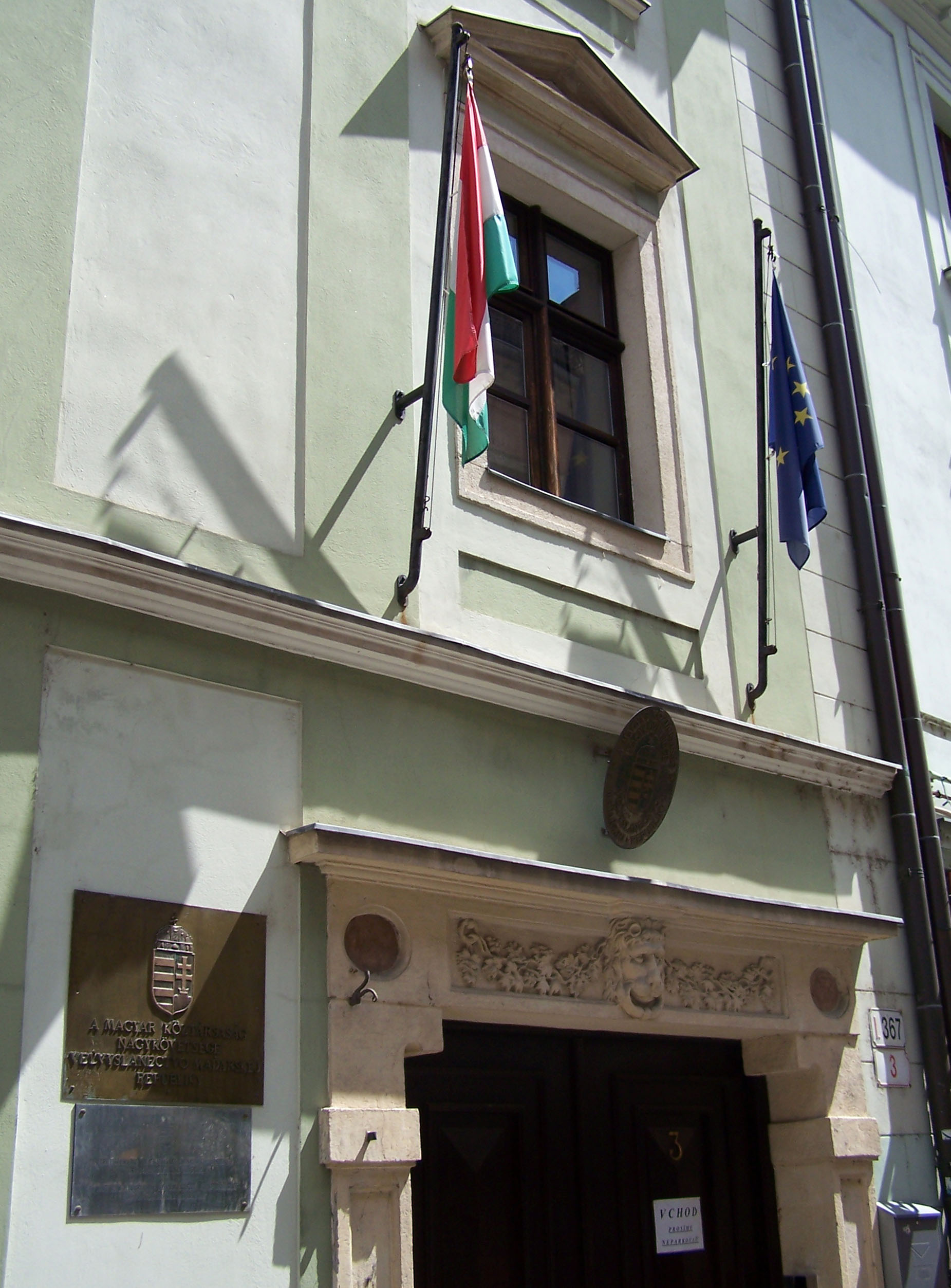
Embassy of Hungary

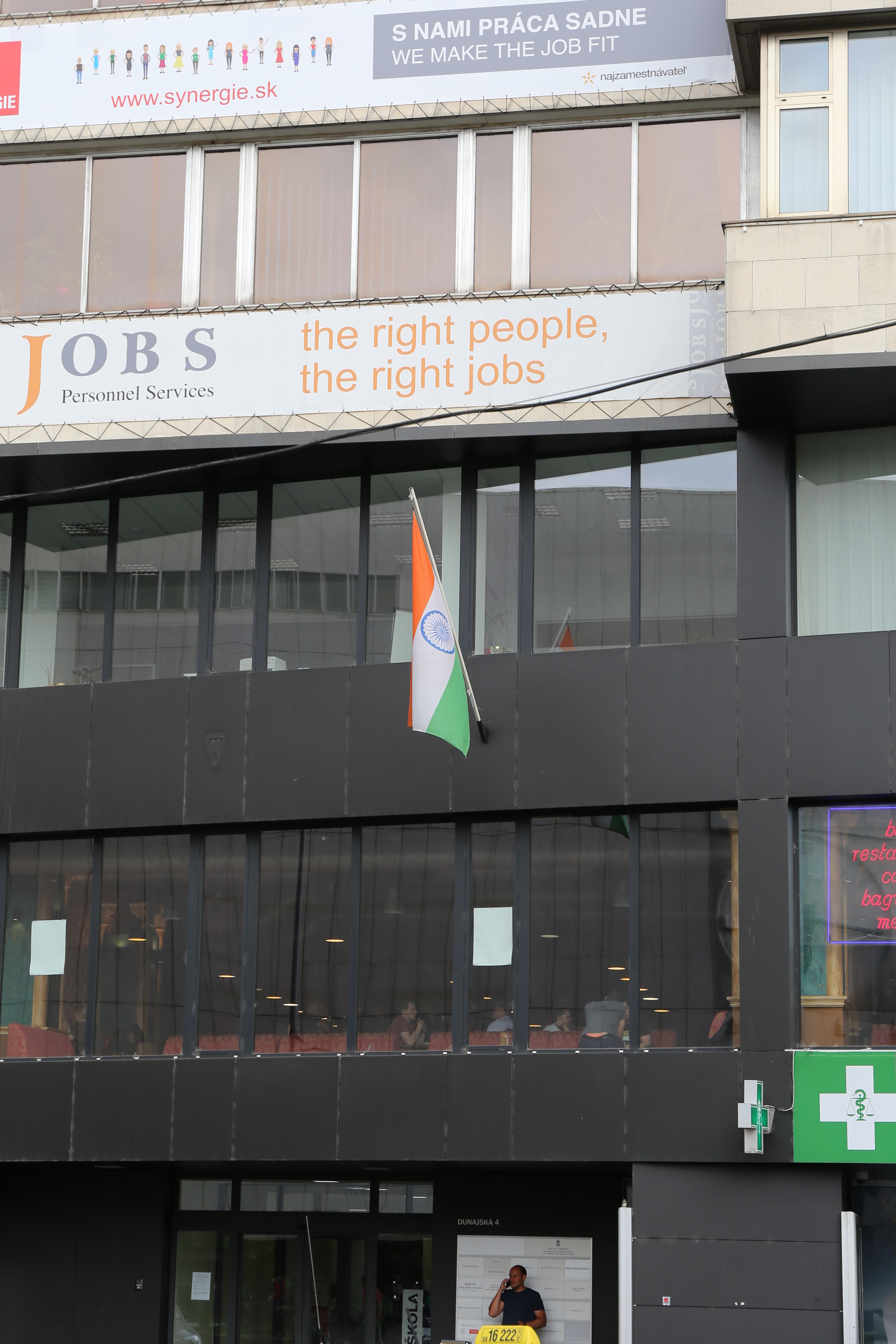
Embassy of India

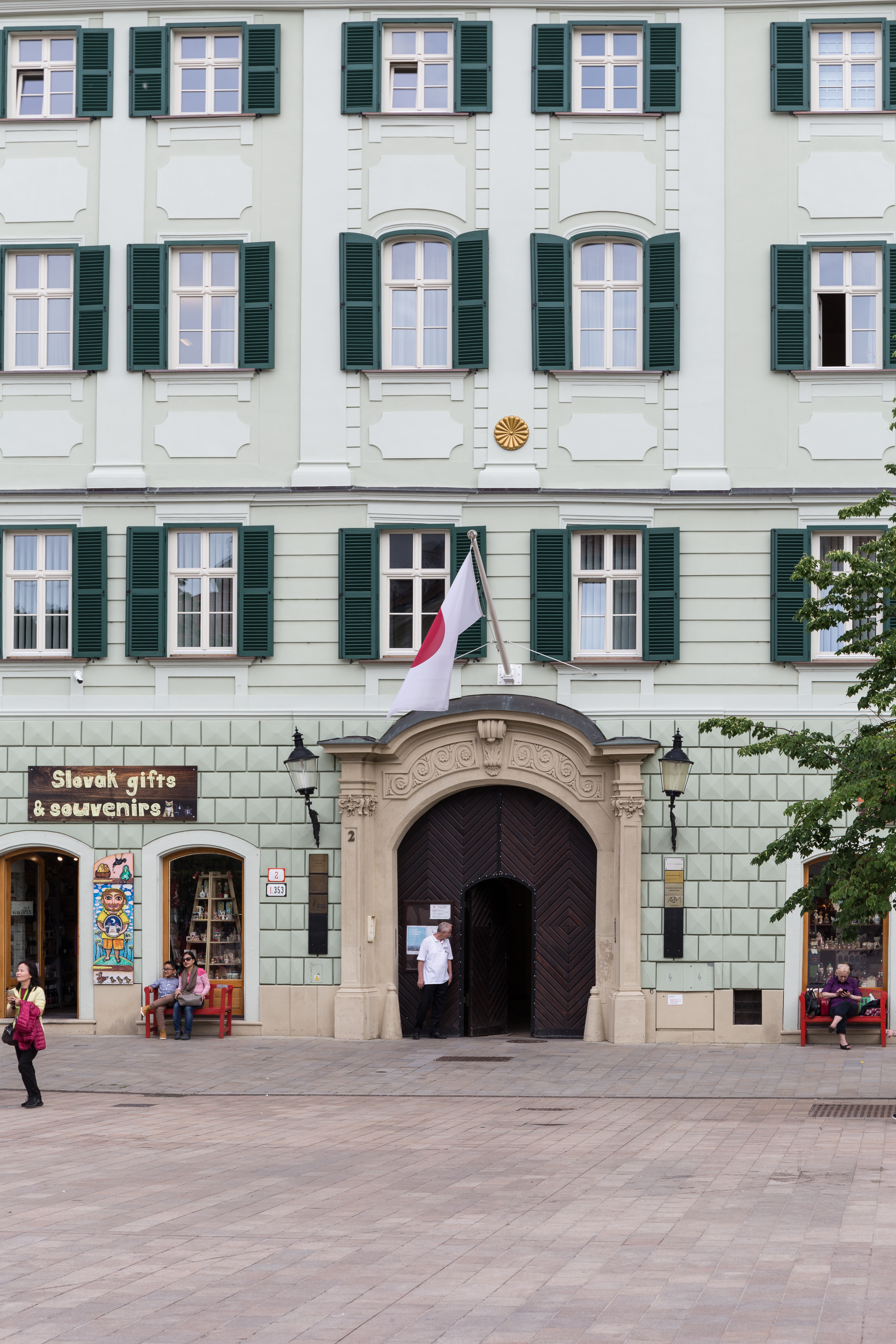
Embassy of Japan

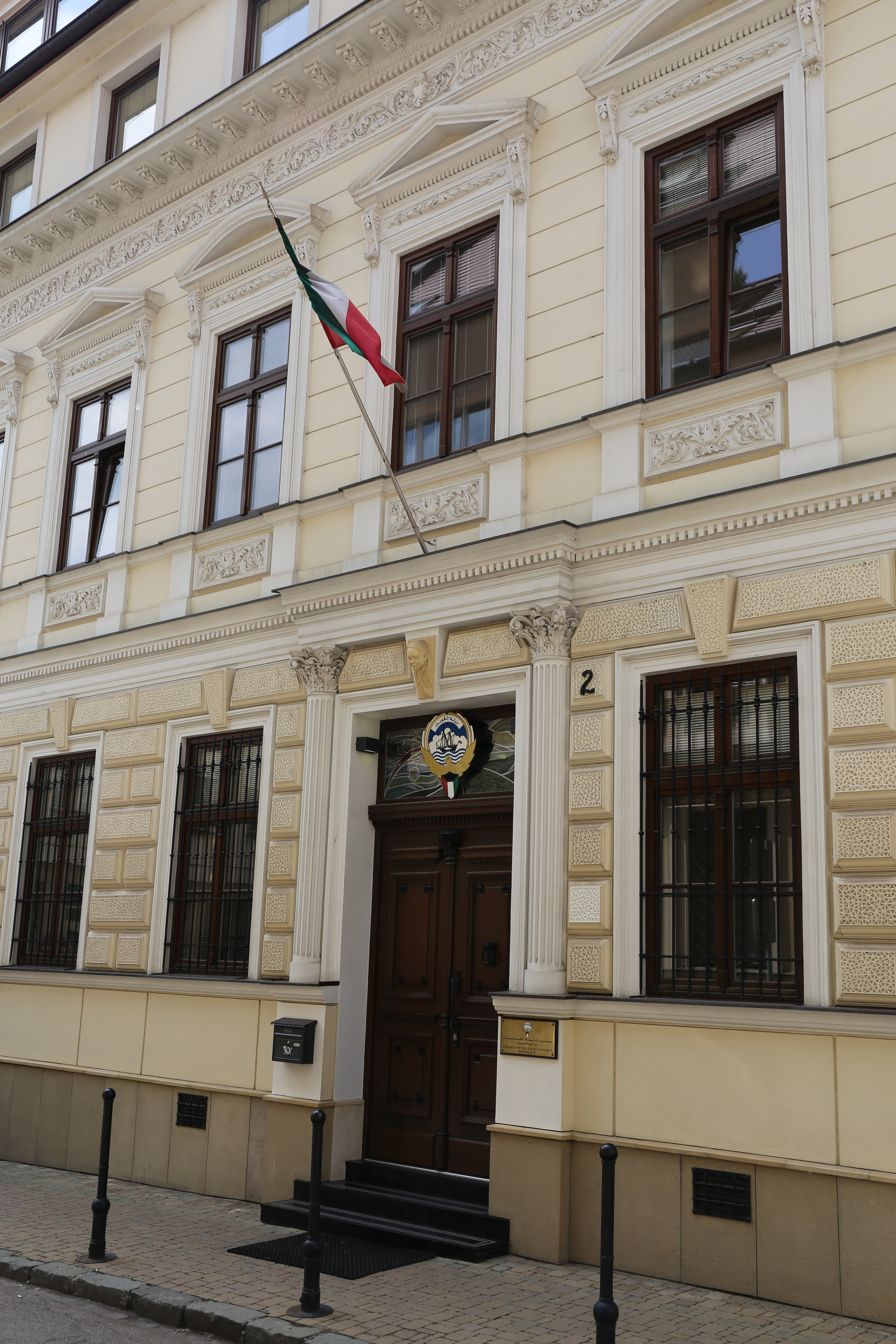
Embassy of Kuwait

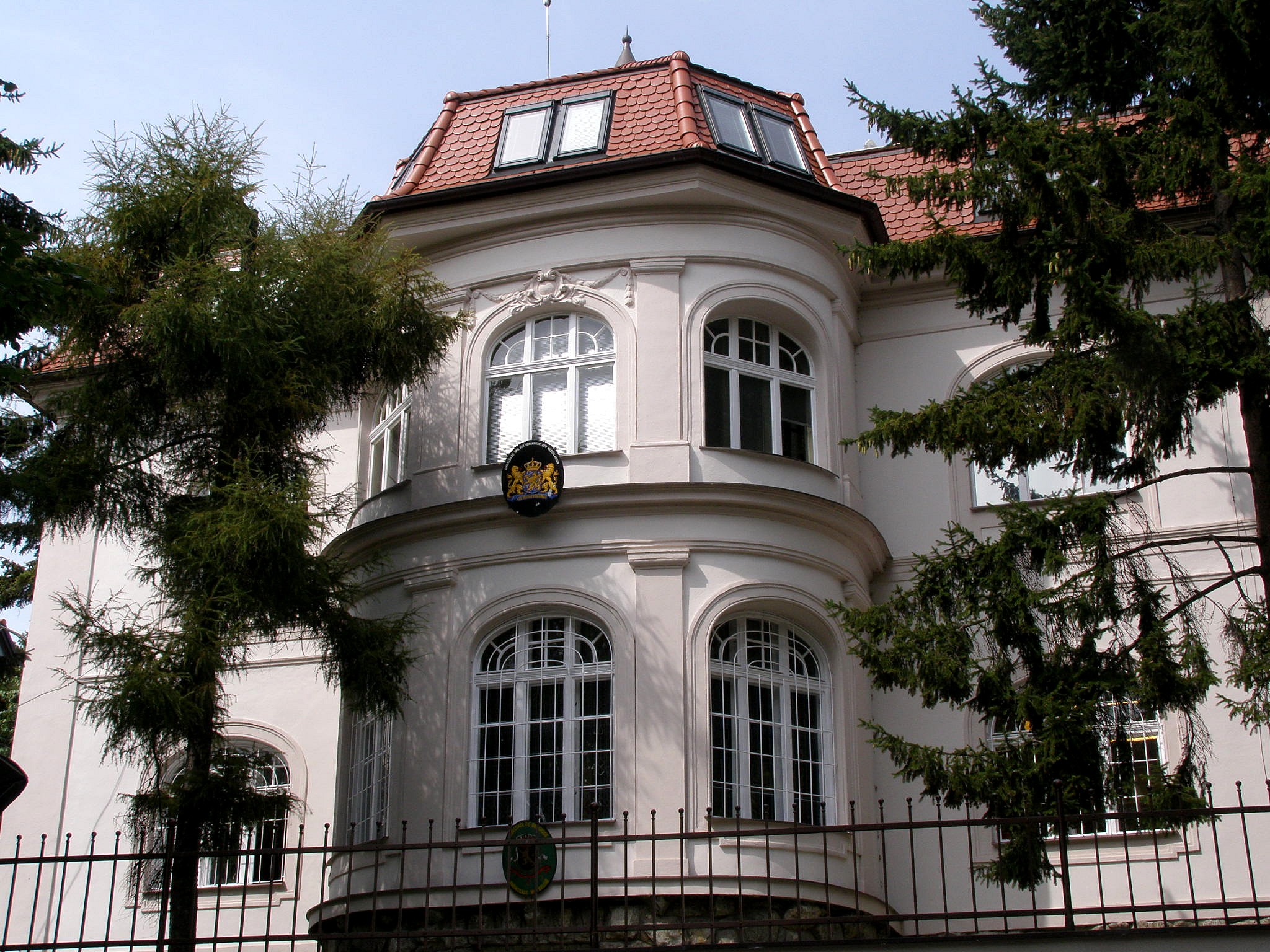
Embassy of the Netherlands

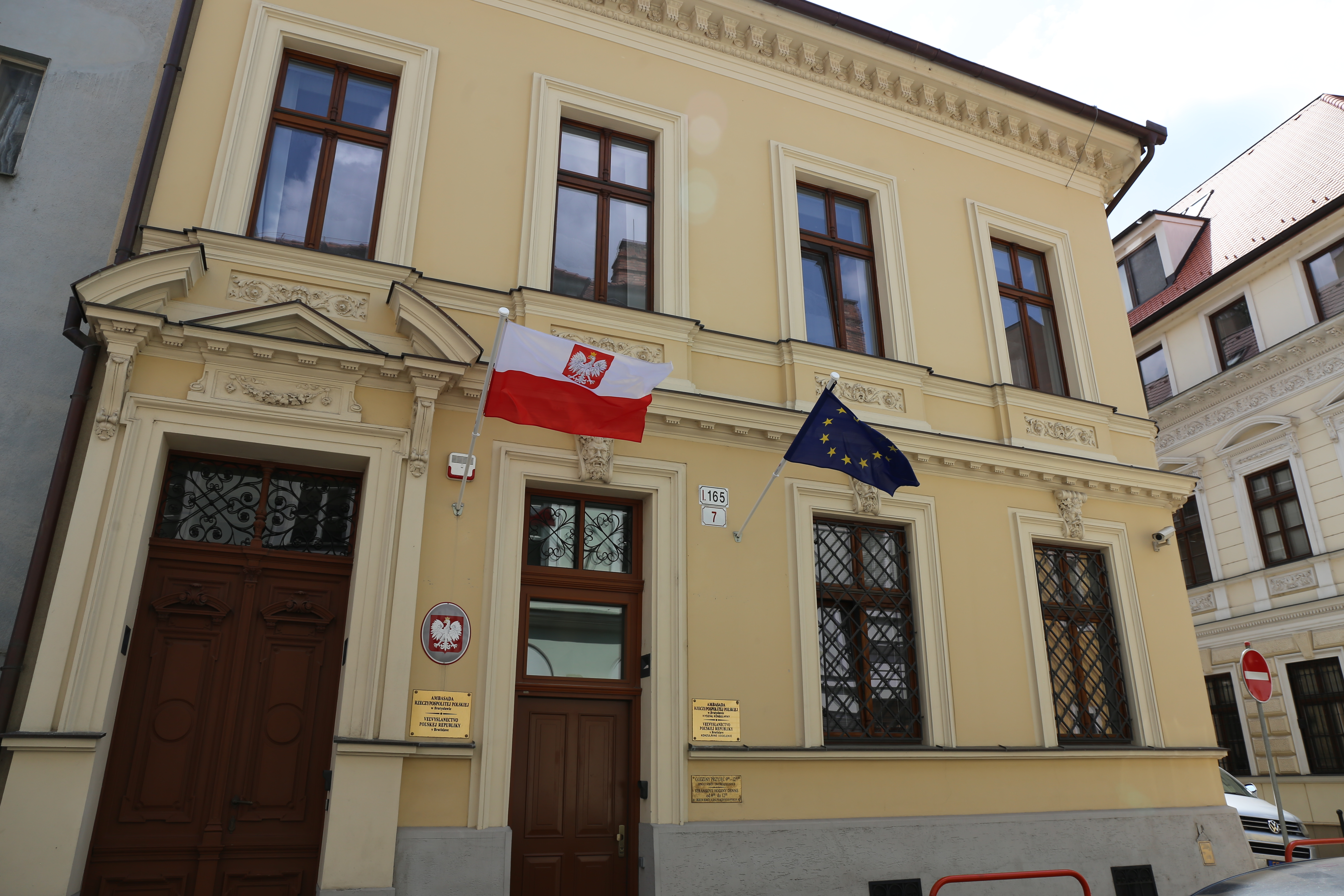
Embassy of Poland

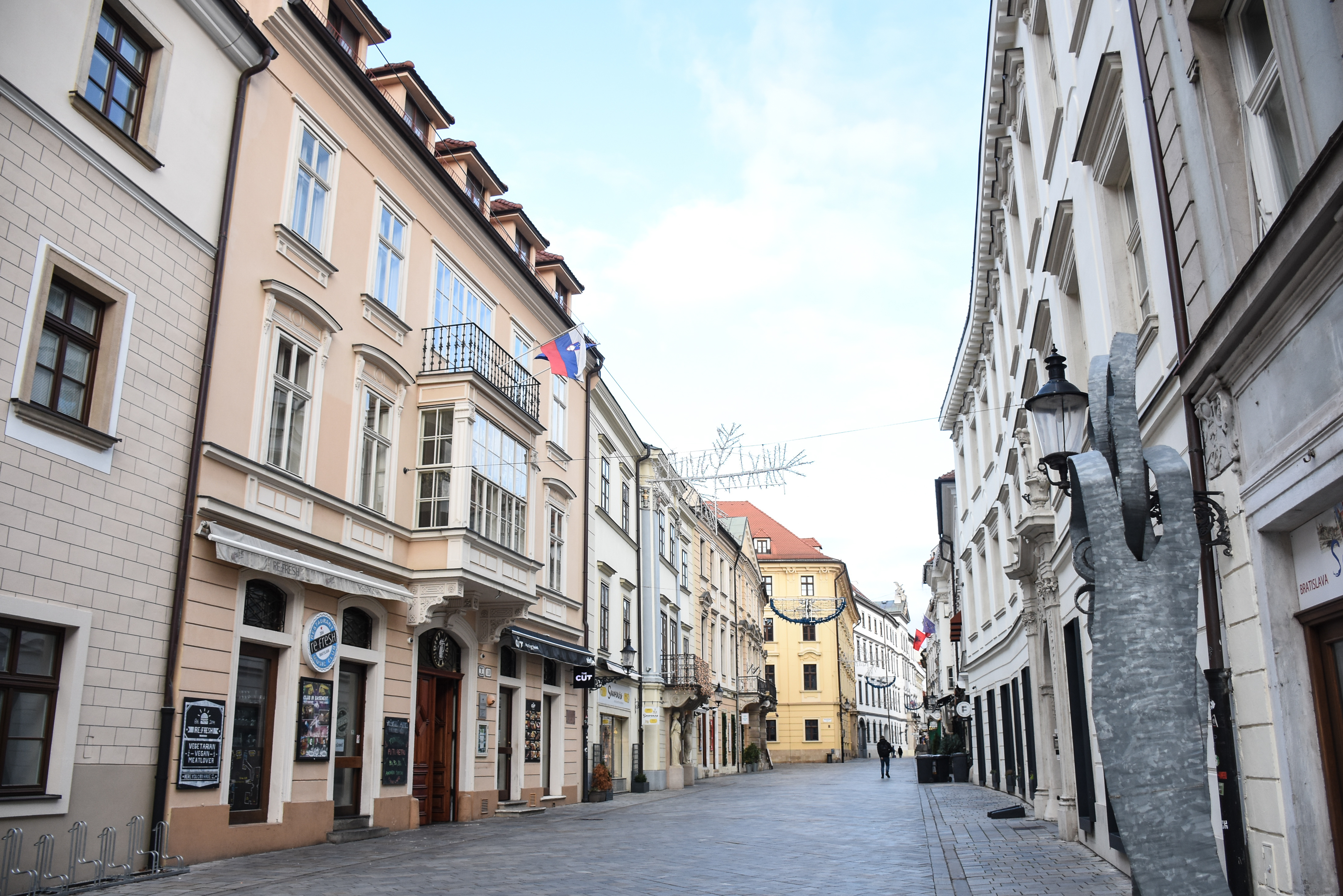
Embassy of Slovenia

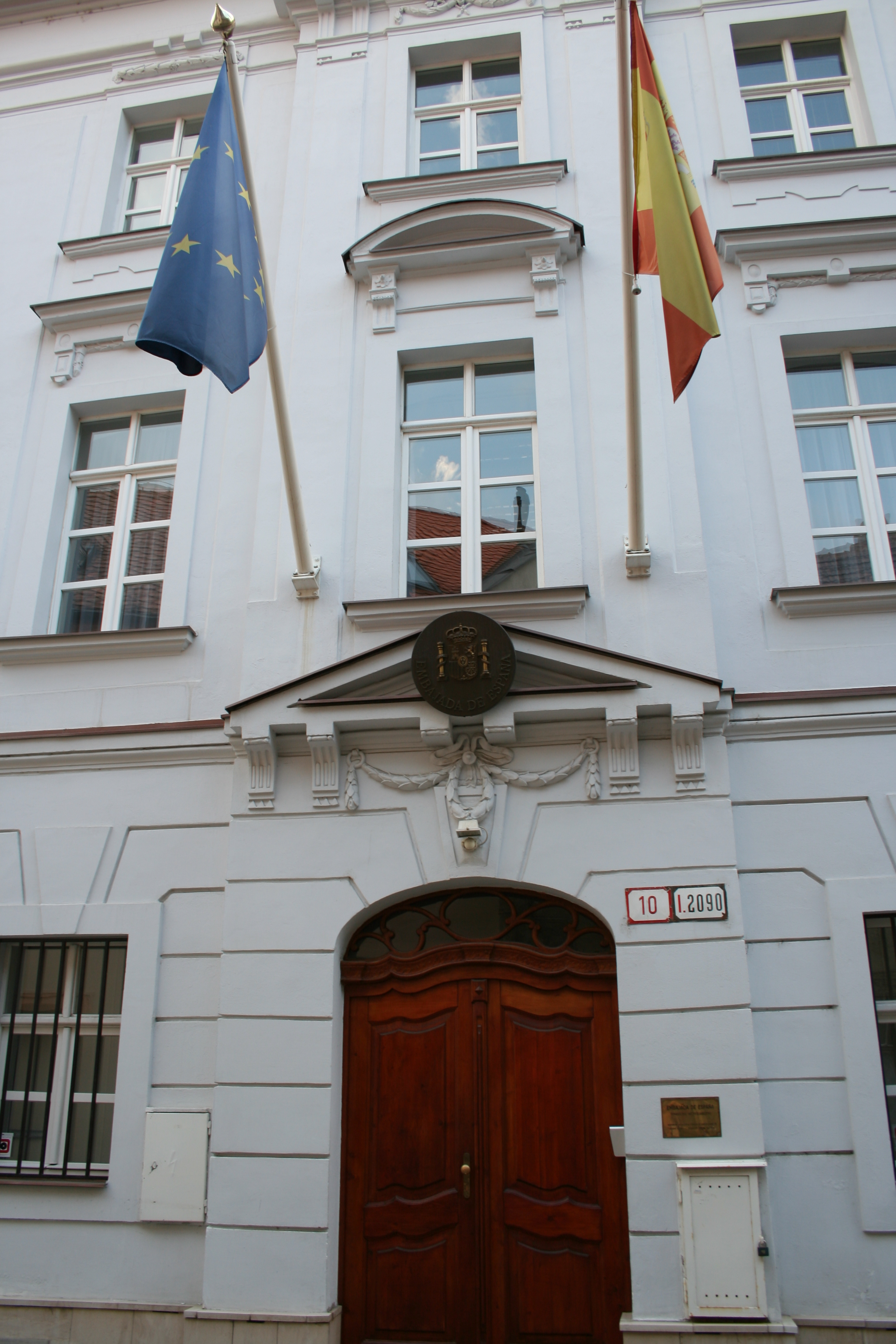
Embassy of Spain

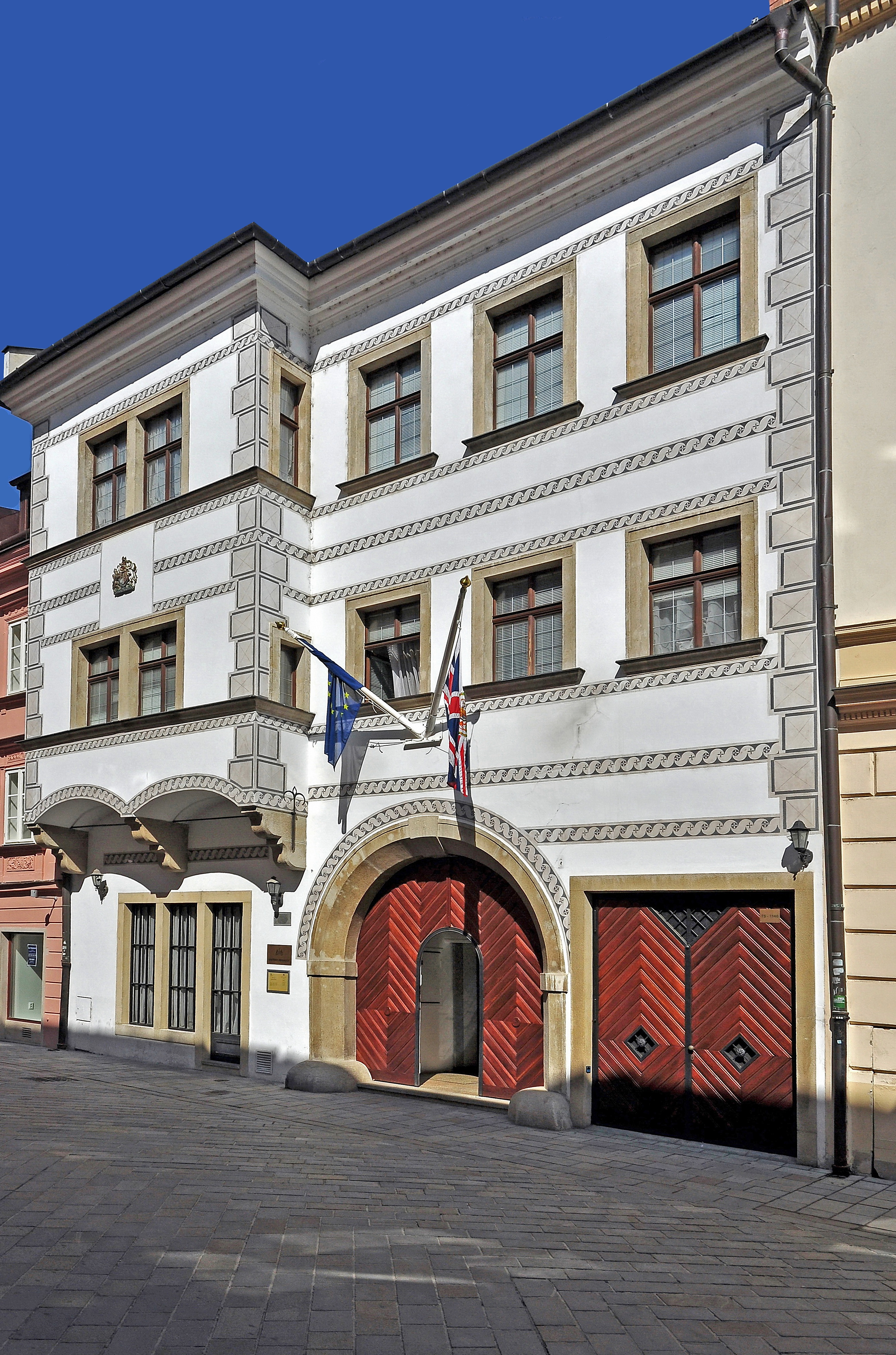
Embassy of the United Kingdom

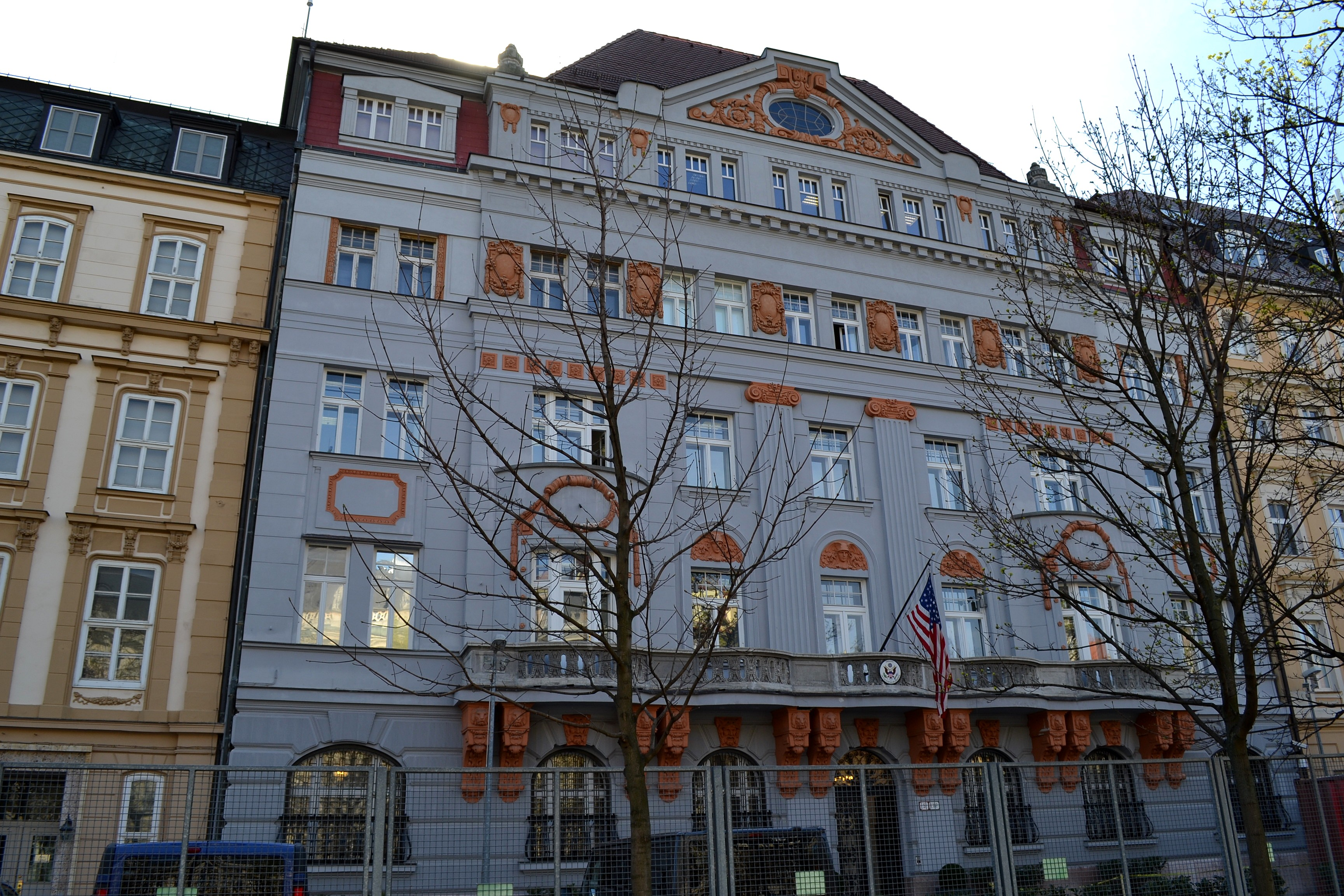
Embassy of the United States

== Consular missions ==
The cities of Banská Bystrica, Košice, and Prešov are host to career consular missions. All entries are consulates-general unless otherwise indicated.

=== Banská Bystrica, Banská Bystrica Region ===
- Hungary (Vice-consulate) (Note: Subordinate to the Hungarian consulate-general in Košice.)

=== Košice, Košice Region ===
- Hungary

=== Prešov, Prešov Region ===
- Ukraine

== Non-resident embassies ==
=== Berlin, Germany ===
1. Bahrain
2. Burundi
3. Cambodia
4. Chad
5. Congo-Brazzaville
6. Ethiopia
7. Honduras
8. Guinea
9. Jamaica
10. Madagascar
11. Malawi
12. Mauritania
13. Nepal
14. Niger
15. Togo
16. Tanzania
17. Uganda
18. Zambia

=== Brussels, Belgium ===
1. Eswatini
2. Gambia
3. Guinea-Bissau

=== Prague, Czech Republic ===
1. Afghanistan
2. Bosnia and Herzegovina
3. Colombia
4. Congo-Kinshasa
5. Finland
6. Mongolia
7. North Korea

=== Vienna, Austria ===
1. Angola
2. Argentina
3. Armenia
4. Australia
5. Bangladesh
6. Belgium
7. Bolivia
8. Burkina Faso
9. Chile
10. Costa Rica
11. Denmark
12. Dominican Republic
13. Ecuador
14. El Salvador
15. Estonia
16. Guatemala
17. Iceland
18. Iran
19. Iraq
20. Ivory Coast
21. Jordan
22. Kenya
23. Kyrgyzstan
24. Laos
25. Latvia
26. Lebanon
27. Lithuania
28. Luxembourg
29. Malaysia
30. Mexico
31. Moldova
32. Morocco
33. Namibia
34. New Zealand
35. Nigeria
36. Norway
37. Oman
38. Pakistan
39. Panama
40. Paraguay
41. Peru
42. Philippines
43. Qatar
44. San Marino
45. Saudi Arabia
46. South Africa
47. Sri Lanka
48. Sudan
49. Sweden
50. Syria
51. Thailand
52. Turkmenistan
53. United Arab Emirates
54. Uruguay
55. Uzbekistan
56. Venezuela
57. Yemen

=== Other cities ===
1. Andorra (Andorra la Vella)
2. Botswana (London)
3. Ghana (Budapest)
4. Guyana (London)
5. Lesotho (Rome)
6. Mali (Rome)
7. Malta (Valletta)
8. Myanmar (Belgrade)
9. Nicaragua (Madrid)
10. Senegal (Warsaw)
11. Seychelles (Paris)
12. Sierra Leone (Moscow)
13. Singapore (Singapore)
14. Somalia (Moscow)
15. Tunisia (Budapest)
16. Zimbabwe (Geneva)

== Closed missions ==
Host city	Sending country	Mission	Year closed	Ref.
Bratislava	Angola	Embassy	Unknown	
Bratislava	Belgium	Embassy	2015	
Bratislava	Denmark	Embassy	2014	
Bratislava	Finland	Embassy	2015	
Bratislava	Iraq	Embassy	Unknown	
Bratislava	Sweden	Embassy	2010	
Košice	Czechia	Consulate-General	2009	

== See also ==
- Foreign relations of Slovakia
- List of diplomatic missions of Slovakia
