= Taipei Economic and Cultural Office, Prague =

Political representative office in Prague, Czech Republic

- Tchajpejská hospodářská a kulturní kancelář v Praze 駐捷克臺北經濟文化辦事處

Agency overview
- Formed: August 1991
- Jurisdiction: Czech Republic
- Headquarters: Evropská 2590/33C, Prague 6, Czech Republic
- Agency executive: Remus Li-Kuo Chen, Representative
- Website: Official website

The Taipei Economic and Cultural Office, Prague (Chinese: 駐捷克臺北經濟文化辦事處; pinyin: Zhù Jiékè Táiběi jīngjì wénhuà bànshì chǔ; Czech: Tchajpejská hospodářská a kulturní kancelář v Praze) represents the interests of Taiwan in the Czech Republic in the absence of formal diplomatic relations, functioning as a de facto embassy. Its counterpart is the Czech Economic and Cultural Office, which was established in November 1993.

== Background ==
The aim of the representative office is to further bilateral cooperation between Czech Republic and Taiwan in the fields of economics, culture, education and research. In addition, it offers consular services.

On 4 July 1991, Taiwan and Czechoslovakia reached a mutual location agreement and on 7 August, the economic and cultural office was established in Prague, the capital of Czechoslovakia, becoming the second representative office to be established in Central and Eastern Europe. The office successively set up business, consular affairs, economic, cultural, and science and technology groups for related affairs. Following the dissolution of Czechoslovakia, the office became responsible for affairs related to the Czech Republic.

In September 2023, the office opened a cultural division.

== See also ==
- Czech Republic-Taiwan relations
- List of diplomatic missions of Taiwan
- List of diplomatic missions in Czech Republic
