= Hong Kong–Taiwan relations =

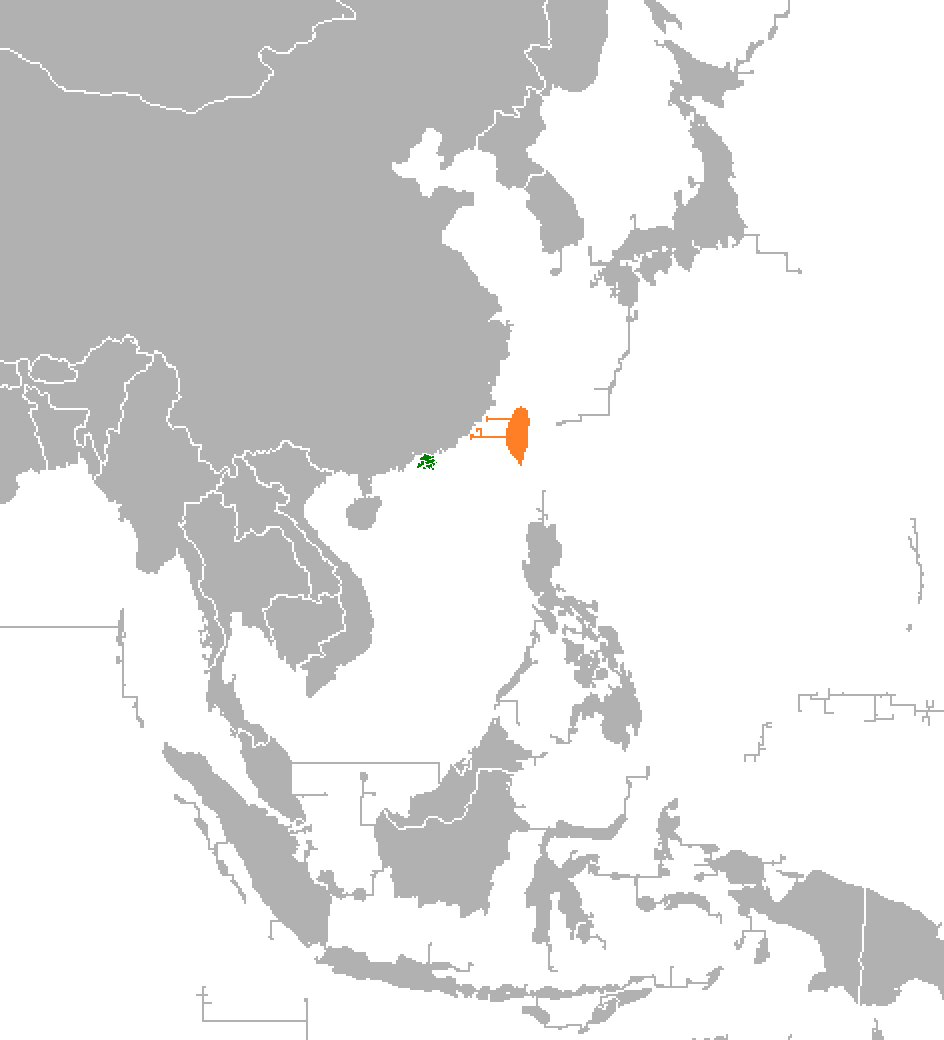
- Hong Kong: Taiwan

Diplomatic mission
- Hong Kong Economic, Trade and Cultural Office (The operation has been suspended. Currently operated by the Taiwan Affairs Office.): Taipei Economic and Cultural Office in Hong Kong

Relations between the government of Hong Kong SAR of the People's Republic of China (PRC) and the Taiwan Area of the Republic of China (ROC) encompass both when Hong Kong was under British rule or when the Republic of China controlled mainland China and afterwards the ROC fled to Taiwan. This is also a part of the Cross-strait relations.

== History ==
=== Timeline ===
Dutch & Spanish
(Netherlands) (Spain)
Tungning
Qing
(Qing dynasty)
Japan
(Empire of Japan)
Republic of China
Ming
Qing
S. Ming
Qing
(Qing dynasty)
British Hong Kong
Japan
(Empire of Japan)
British Hong Kong
HKSAR
│
1625
│
1650
│
1675
│
1700
│
1725
│
1750
│
1775
│
1800
│
1825
│
1850
│
1875
│
1900
│
1925
│
1950
│
1975
│
2000
│
2025

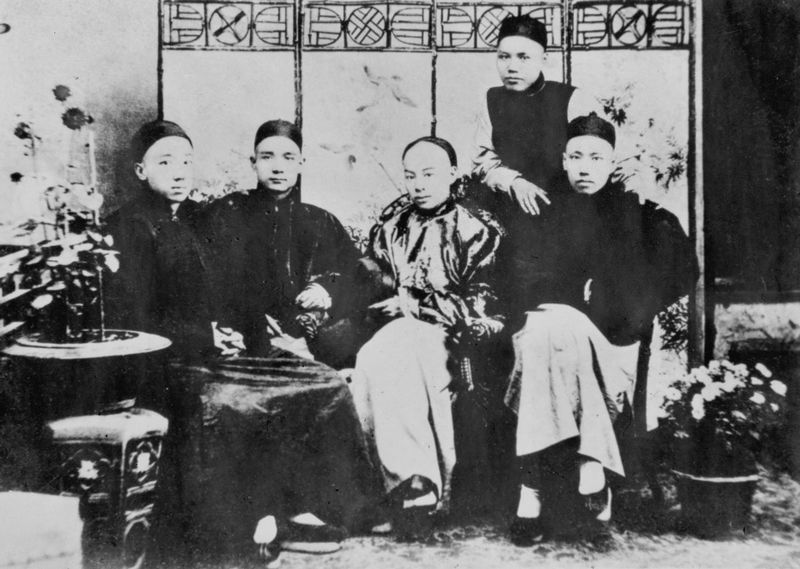
The Four Bandits in 1888, in Hong Kong. Sun Yat-sen is second from the left.

In February 1895, the Blue Sky with a White Sun design was first presented in Hong Kong.

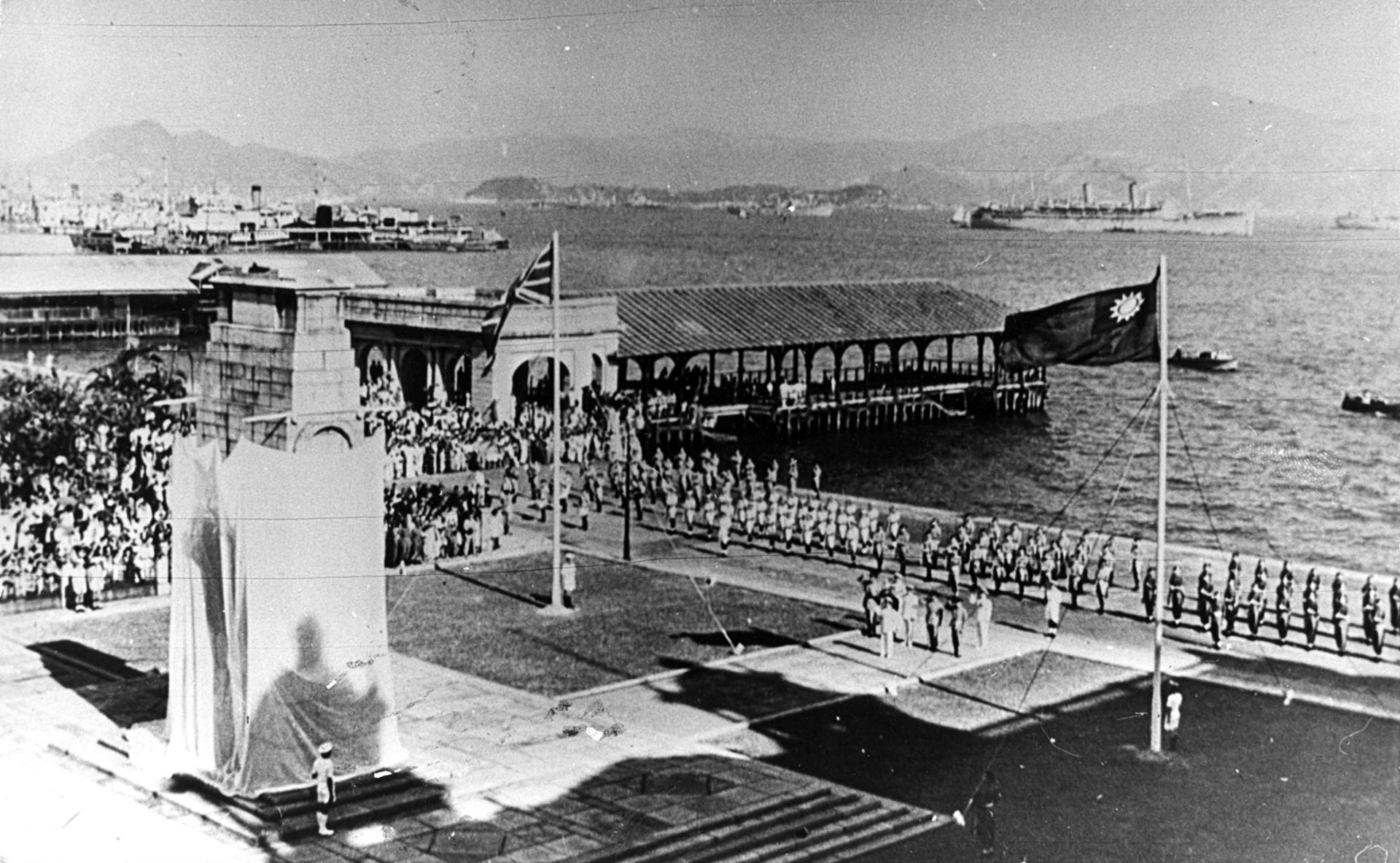
Republic of China flag flying in Hong Kong at The Cenotaph on Liberation Day in 1945

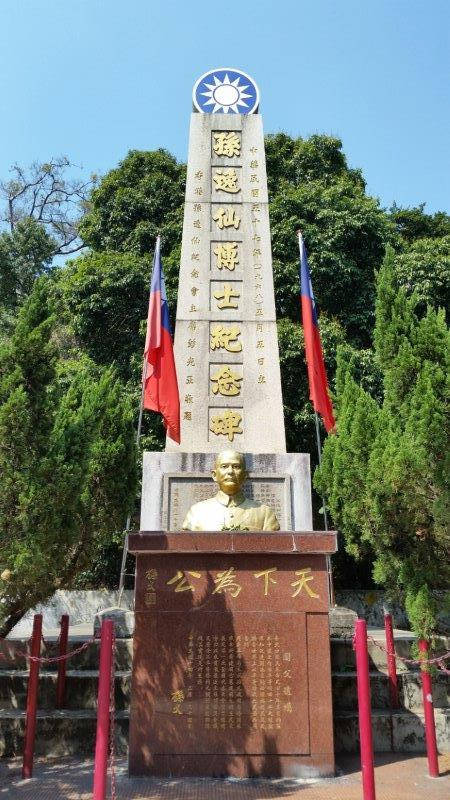
Obelisk and Republic of China flags flying at Sun Yat Sen Commemorative Garden, Tuen Mun

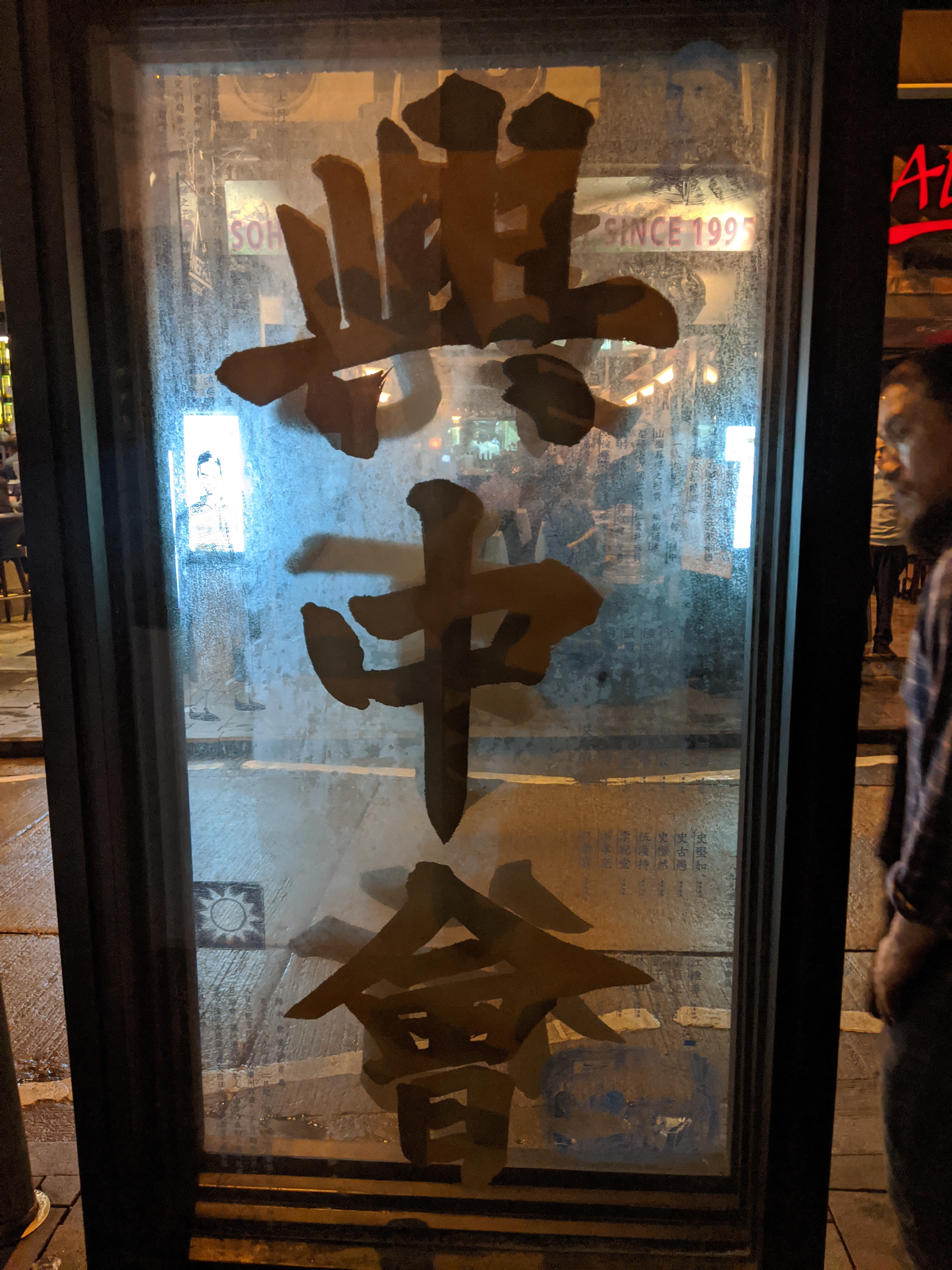
Marker in front of the former Revive China Society headquarters in Hong Kong, along the Dr Sun Yat-sen Historical Trail

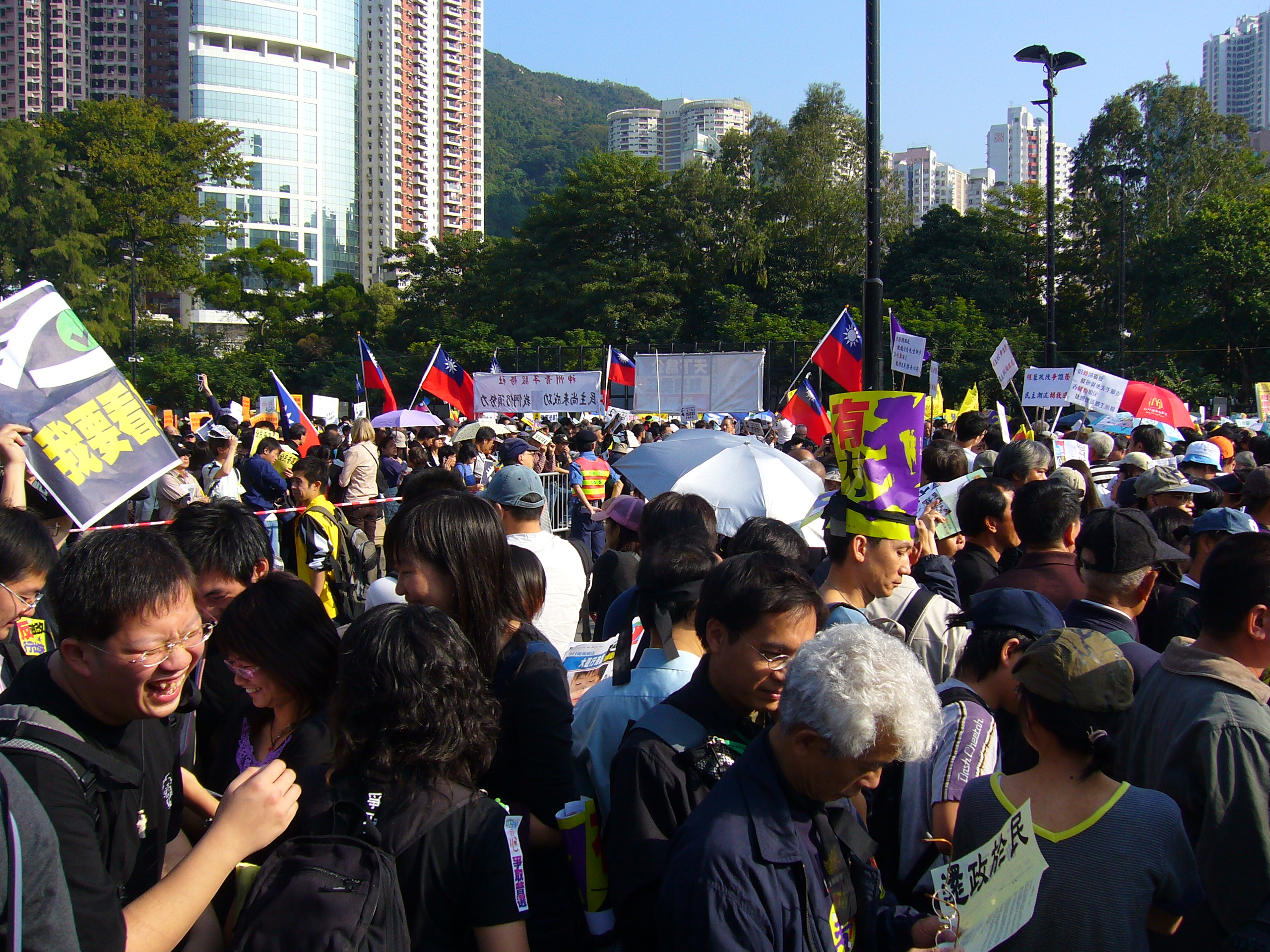
Flag of the Republic of China during the pro-democracy protest in December 2005.

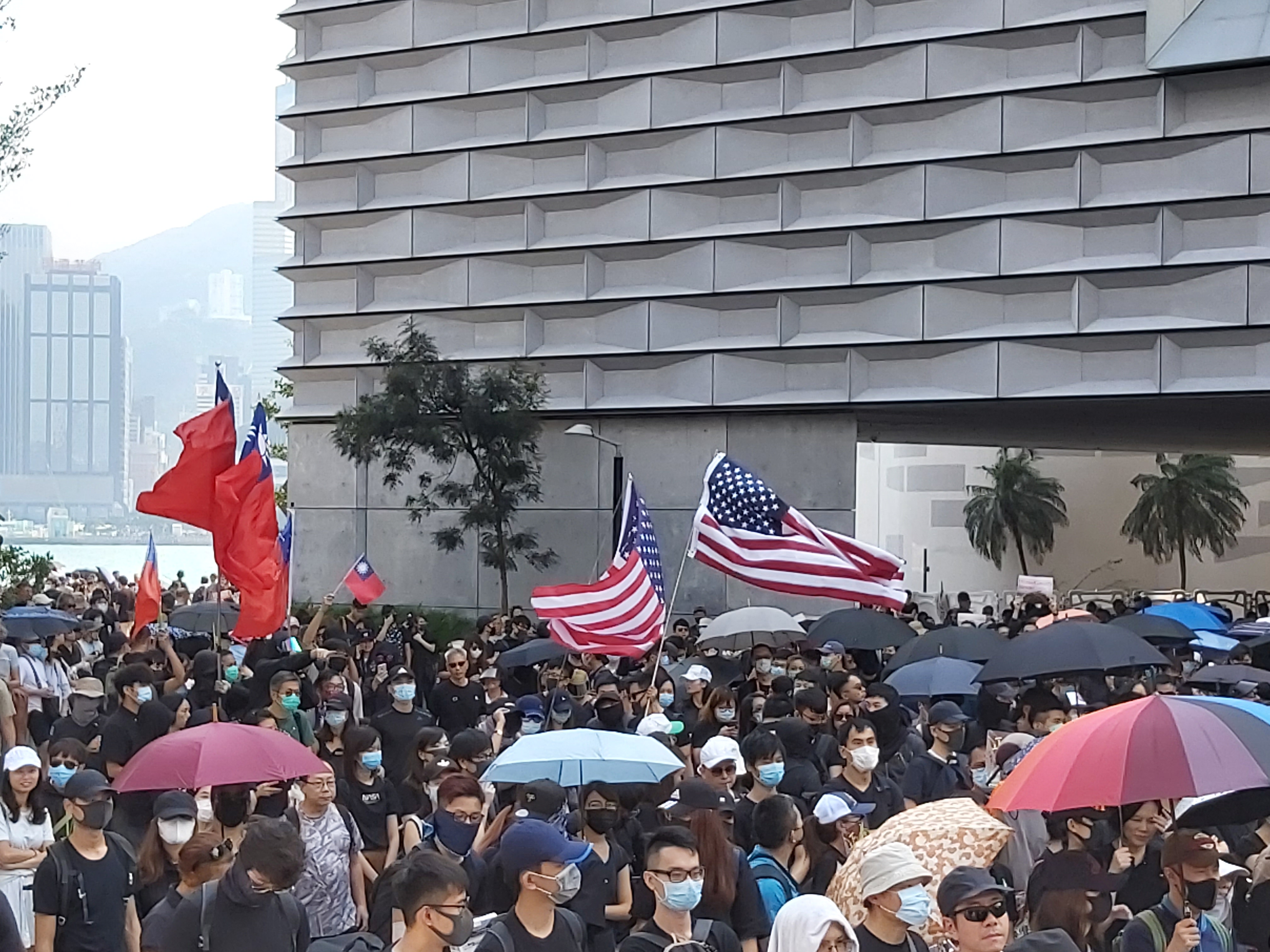
ROC flag in the 2019–20 Hong Kong protests, as a symbol of resistance.

=== Early contacts ===
Before 1842, both regions were part of the Qing dynasty; in 1842, Hong Kong Island was ceded to the British Empire as a result of the First Opium War, and in 1895, Taiwan was ceded to the Empire of Japan as a result of the First Sino-Japanese War. Sun Yat-sen was a student in Hong Kong in the late 1800s and believed that the Qing dynasty's ineffectiveness and loss in the First Sino-Japanese War necessitated a revolution to replace Chinese dynasties with a modern republic. In 1888, he was pictured in Hong Kong as a member of the Four Bandits, a group that met to discuss overthrowing the Qing dynasty, and in 1894, he began the formation of the Revive China Society to overthrow the Qing dynasty. On 21 February 1895, while at a Revive China Society meeting in Hong Kong, Lu Haodong presented his Blue Sky with a White Sun design, which became the emblem of the Republic of China. The Revive China Society was headquartered at 13 Staunton Street in Hong Kong, and in 1905 it was merged with other groups to form the Tongmenghui. This organization had wide support among Chinese, and played a key role in uprisings started by revolutionaries, including the Xinhai Revolution in 1911, which overthrew the Qing dynasty. After the success of the Xinhai Revolution, Sun Yat-sen declared the establishment of the Republic of China on 1 January 1912, and was inaugurated as the first provisional president. Later that same year in August 1912, the Tongmenghui merged with other groups to create the Kuomintang (Nationalist Party), and Sun Yat-sen was chosen as its leader.

Sun Yat-sen returned to Hong Kong in 1923 to visit the University of Hong Kong, which had incorporated the Hong Kong College of Medicine for Chinese as its medical school, of which Sun Yat-sen was an early alumnus. During his visit at HKU, he gave a speech and declared Hong Kong's inspiration to him in the revolutions that eventually created the Republic of China: "That is the answer to the question, where did I get my revolutionary ideas: it is entirely in Hong Kong." In addition to being the origin of his revolutionary ideas, Hong Kong also offered protection to some of his family members; Sun Yat-sen's mother, Lady Yang, resided with his eldest brother, Dezhang, in Kowloon City, after Sun Yat-sen was placed on a wanted list by the Qing government. With Sun Yat-sen's death in 1925, Chiang Kai-shek became leader of the KMT and Sun Yat-sen's successor, eventually unifying China under the Nationalist government in 1928.

=== The United States and decolonization ===
Longstanding United States policy held the belief that China should not be colonized; the United States, in 1899 had advocated the Open Door Policy, which communicated that China should not be partitioned and colonized. The Nine-Power Treaty in 1922, signed by the British, affirmed the Open Door Policy and territorial integrity of China. In July 1940, Winston Churchill declared in Parliament that "We desire to see China's status and integrity preserved, and as was indicated in our Note of 14th January, 1939, we are ready to negotiate with the Chinese Government, after the conclusion of peace, the abolition of extraterritorial rights, the rendition of concessions and the revision of treaties on the basis of reciprocity and equality," affirming territorial integrity and relinquishment of extraterritorial rights in China. The idea of territorial integrity and decolonization was further encapsulated in the August 1941 Atlantic Charter statement, issued by Franklin Roosevelt (who was staunchly against colonialism) and Winston Churchill, stipulating that "territorial adjustments must be in accord with the wishes of the peoples concerned." Though Winston Churchill did not want British colonies to decolonize, he agreed to the Atlantic Charter's decolonization provisions "to get the Americans into the war" with military aid on the side of the Allies. On 1 January 1942, the Declaration of the United Nations was signed by the Big Four (the United States, United Kingdom, Soviet Union, and Republic of China), stipulating that the Atlantic Charter's pledges should be upheld, which later became the basis of the Charter of the United Nations in 1945.

=== Hong Kong during World War II ===
The Nationalist government had requested from the British that British pilots serve as advisors in the Nationalist air force, and also requested that the Nationalists be allowed to create a secret airplane factory in Hong Kong; the British denied those requests. In January 1941, as the Japanese military advanced in mainland China towards Hong Kong, UK Prime Minister Winston Churchill was reluctant to defend the colony, and said that defensive troops should be reduced to a "symbolical scale" there. By the summer of 1941, the British and Nationalists, under Chiang Kai-shek, had a military cooperation agreement, agreeing that if Hong Kong were attacked by the Japanese, then the Nationalists would attack the Japanese from the rear and provide relief to the British.

Chan Chak was the Nationalist government's representative in Hong Kong when the Japanese attacked on 8 December 1941. Previous to that date, the Second Sino-Japanese War had waged on for several years without the Republic of China ever declaring war on Japan; following the Japanese invasion of Hong Kong, Chiang Kai-shek declared war on Japan the next day, on 9 December 1941. Additionally on 9 December 1941, Chiang Kai-shek ordered 3 Nationalist corps, directed by General Yu Hanmou, to head towards Hong Kong. The plan was for the Nationalist army to fight the Japanese from the rear on 1 January 1942, but the Japanese had already broken Hong Kong's defense before the Nationalists could get in position to attack.

With a quick victory by the Japanese against the weakly-defended colony in December 1941, the Japanese occupation of Hong Kong began, and both Hong Kong and Taiwan were subjects of the Empire of Japan.

Also that same month in December 1941, the United States entered World War II, several months after issuing the Atlantic Charter and having Churchill agree to decolonize. Despite the weak protection of Hong Kong and agreements by the British to the Nine-Power Treaty, Atlantic Charter, and Declaration of the United Nations, the British refused to decolonize and have Hong Kong handed over to the Republic of China.

In January 1942, Chiang Kai-shek became supreme commander of the Allied powers' China Burma India Theater, and he considered Hong Kong under his command, rather than under the British. The British agreed that Hong Kong was "within the operational sphere of Generalissimo Chiang Kai-shek." Chiang began to think about repealing the unequal treaties, as the myth of British invincibility had been shattered, and instructed ambassador Wellington Koo to find more information on the British's position on the future of Hong Kong. The British Colonial Office said that "the arrangements existing before the Japanese occupation would not be restored," signaling a potential retrocession of Hong Kong to the Republic of China.

In late 1942, the Republic of China repealed the unequal treaties and began negotiations with the United Kingdom on the establishment of a new, fairer treaty. Chiang Kai-shek attempted to put the issue of Hong Kong onto the two parties' agenda, suggesting that the New Territories should be returned to the Republic of China along with the other foreign concessions. On 13 November 1942, TV Soong met with Horace James Seymour to ask for the retrocession of the New Territories. The Nationalists were careful to ask for the New Territories rather than all of Hong Kong, knowing that the New Territories was deeply integrated and vital to the rest of Hong Kong, and a return of the New Territories would make the rest of Hong Kong worthless to the British. This was fiercely rejected by Winston Churchill, and the United Kingdom also demanded that the Republic of China give their written consent that the New Territories concession was not included within the unequal treaties, or else they would refuse to sign, and so the Republic of China was forced to drop the concession of New Territories from the agenda. In 1943, the two sides signed the Sino-British New Equal Treaty, with the Republic of China securing the right to raise the issue of Hong Kong and the New Territories on a later occasion; on 11 January 1943, TV Soong sent a note to Horace James Seymour, stating that "the Chinese Government reserve[d] its right to propose [Hong Kong's leased territories] for discussion at a later date." A day later on 12 January 1943, TV Soong held a press conference where he explained the agreement.

=== After World War II ===
Hong Kong–Republic of China relations
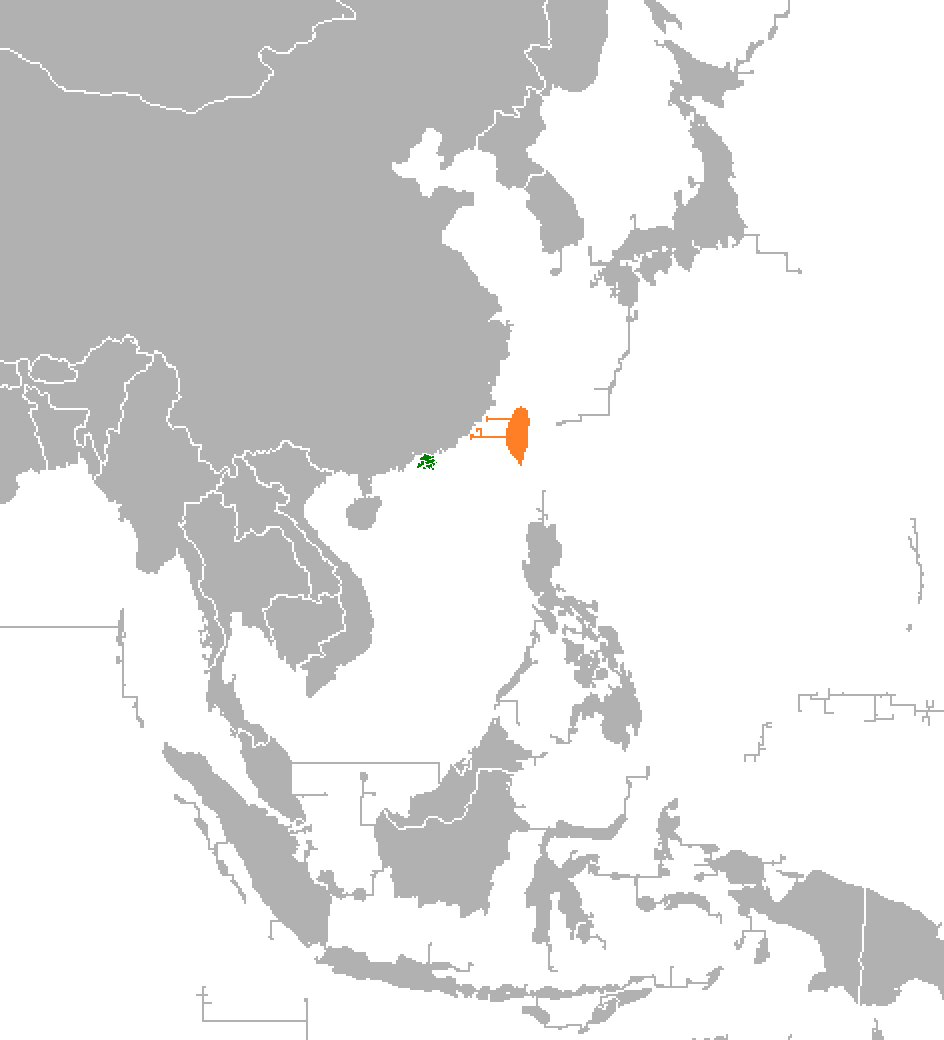

- Hong Kong: Taiwan

Before the surrender of Japan at the end of World War II, U.S. President Franklin Roosevelt promised Soong Mei-ling, wife of Chiang Kai-shek, that Hong Kong would be restored to Republic of China control. The United States sent ambassador Patrick Hurley to London in April 1945 and asked that the British return Hong Kong to the Republic of China, to which Winston Churchill said it would only happen "over my dead body." The British previously agreed that Hong Kong was "within the operational sphere of Generalissimo Chiang Kai-shek," and US General Order No. 1 also stipulated that the Japanese surrender to Chiang. When news broke that the Japanese had surrendered, Chiang ordered the Nationalist Thirteenth Corps under Shi Jue, less than 300 miles away from Hong Kong, to liberate Hong Kong. Additionally, the Nationalist New First Corps under Sun Liren was also less than 300 miles away, and was ordered by Chiang to liberate Canton (Guangzhou); combined, the forces numbered 60,000 soldiers.

However, at the end of the war, the British moved quickly to regain control of Hong Kong in August 1945, preventing the unification of Hong Kong and the Republic of China (ROC). After the loss in the Chinese Civil War in 1949, the Kuomintang-ruled Republic of China government, started by Sun Yat-sen, fled to Taiwan in the Great Retreat. Shortly after, on 6 January 1950, the UK recognized the People's Republic of China (PRC) as the government of China due to economic interests, and blocked the Republic of China government from participating in the Treaty of San Francisco in 1951, which introduced the issue of which government Taiwan was to be surrendered to. In 1957, UK Prime Minister Harold Macmillan had a secret agreement with the United States, where the United States agreed to defend Hong Kong with the British as a "joint defense problem" in case it was attacked by communist China. In exchange, the British pledged to not push for communist China's membership in the United Nations, which would leave the UN seat with Taiwan. However, in 1971, United Nations General Assembly Resolution 2758 was supported by the British and passed, recognizing the PRC as the legitimate government of China in the UN rather than the Republic of China. Afterwards, the British and People's Republic of China began negotiations on the handover of Hong Kong, ultimately sealing Hong Kong's future with the PRC rather than the ROC.

Both during and after the Chinese Civil War, many people from mainland China, including pro-Kuomintang refugees and former soldiers, fled to both Hong Kong and Taiwan. For example, future ROC president Ma Ying-jeou was born in Hong Kong in 1950, after his parents had fled the mainland. By mid-1950, around 10,000 Nationalist soldiers had arrived in Hong Kong, temporarily held on a fort on Mount Davis. In June 1950, the soldiers were targeted by pro-Communists in violent clashes, leading to the relocation of 6,000 of the targeted soldiers a week later to Rennie's Mill. An additional 10,000-20,000 Nationalist refugees settled at Rennie's Mill, where the Hong Kong Rennie's Mill Refugee Camp Relief Committee (HKRMRC) was set up with Nationalist funds from Taiwan's Free China Relief Association (FCRA). The FCRA began setting up a permanent pro-Nationalist, anti-Communist community in Hong Kong, earning Rennie's Mill the nickname "Little Taiwan." Several thousand of the most enthusiastic pro-Nationalists were transported by the FCRA to Taiwan.

Nationalists and refugees also settled at the Kowloon Walled City, attracting 2,000 squatters by 1947, who were convinced that the area was under jurisdiction by the ROC. Earlier in 1933, the Nationalist government claimed jurisdiction over the area and began pressuring the British government over the issue. In late 1946, Nationalist government officials visited the site and made a plan to administer the area, creating the "Draft Outline Plan for Reinstatement of Administration." Shortly after in January 1948, KMT officials entered the area and encouraged residents to resist eviction by the colonial government, eventually leading to riots in the Walled City and student protests in ROC-controlled mainland China, where the British consulate in Canton was looted and set on fire.

After the Civil War, the pro-Taiwan camp was a major political force in Hong Kong. Additionally, operations against communists by pro-Nationalists in Hong Kong were particularly intense in the late 1950s to the early 1960s. On Double Ten Day, flags of the Republic of China were frequently seen in Hong Kong, including in Rennie's Mill and Kam Tin; the ordering of the removal of one flag by a junior government official caused the Hong Kong 1956 riots, when pro-Nationalists (called "Rightists") fought against pro-Communists (called "Leftists"). Though the flying of the Republic of China flag during Double Ten Day flag has decreased since the 1997 handover, it can still be seen to this day at places including Hung Lau in Tuen Mun, where an obelisk and bust of Sun Yat-sen are located.

== Official relations and politics ==
=== Official relations ===
In 2005, the Hong Kong Immigration Department denied a visa to Hong Kong-born Ma Ying-jeou, then the mayor of Taipei.

Since 2010, the relationship between Hong Kong and the ROC is managed through the Hong Kong-Taiwan Economic and Cultural Co-operation and Promotion Council (ECCPC) and Taiwan-Hong Kong Economic and Cultural Co-operation Council (THEC). Meanwhile, the Taipei Economic and Cultural Office in Hong Kong (TECO) is the representative office of the Republic of China in Hong Kong, while the Hong Kong Economic, Trade and Cultural Office (HKETCO) is the representative office of Hong Kong in the Republic of China. In addition, the relations with Hong Kong is also conducted by the Mainland Affairs Council, although not all regulations applicable to mainland China are automatically applied to those territories.

In 2018, the Office of the Commissioner of the Ministry of Foreign Affairs told foreign consulates in Hong Kong that they should not attend any ROC Double Ten Day events in the city.

In July 2020, TECO's highest officer in Hong Kong, Kao Ming-tsun, was not granted a renewal of his work visa by the Hong Kong government because he refused to sign a statement supporting the "One China" principle. The Mainland Affairs Council of Taiwan mentioned that other government representatives in TECO had experienced major visa delays from the Hong Kong government as well. In May 2021, Taiwan's Mainland Affairs Council said that pressure from Hong Kong authorities had dwindled its staff in Hong Kong, resulting in only 8 staff members, down from 19 before. All remaining 8 staff members have visas that will expire at the end of 2021, and the visas are not expected to be renewed by the Hong Kong government. In June 2021, Taiwan announced that 7 of the staff members had left Hong Kong. The remaining 8th employee returned to Taiwan on 30 July 2021, when his visa expired. Local TECO staff are to move to Taiwan's Kwang Hwa Information and Culture Centre in Wan Chai.

In March 2021, Beijing's Taiwan Affairs Office warned Taiwan not to interfere with Hong Kong, stating Taiwan should not go "any further down the wrong path of political manipulation of Hong Kong issues" after Taiwan's DPP-led government had expressed concern over pro-democracy lawmakers who were arrested. The same month, the opposition KMT leader, Johnny Chiang, rejected Beijing's offer of one country, two systems (used in Hong Kong) for Taiwan, stating that "We are already used to this kind of lifestyle. If you want Taiwan's people to change it – impossible."

In May 2021, Hong Kong closed its HKETCO office in Taipei, claiming that Taiwan had "grossly interfered in Hong Kong's affairs." In response, Taiwan's MAC stated that "We regret the Hong Kong government's disregard of democracy and the rule of law."

In September 2021, Chris Tang, Secretary for Security in Hong Kong, claimed that celebrations for the Republic of China's Double Ten day could risk breaching the national security law. Tang also claimed that Taiwan is a part of China, and anybody attempting to alter that view would risk being arrested.

In August 2022, Nancy Pelosi visited Taiwan, and many government officials and organizations in Hong Kong made public statements against Pelosi's visit. The government officials who criticized the visit included Chief Executive John Lee, Chief Secretary Eric Chan, Financial Secretary Paul Chan, and Secretary for Justice Paul Lam. Government departments also released statements against the visit, including the Security Bureau, the Constitutional and Mainland Affairs Bureau, the Innovation, Technology and Industry Bureau, and the Transport and Logistics Bureau. Pro-Beijing political parties who condemned the visit included the Democratic Alliance for the Betterment and Progress of Hong Kong, the Liberal Party, the New People's Party, the Hong Kong Federation of Trade Unions, and the Business and Professionals Alliance.

=== Movements and protests ===
In recent times, both regions have been involved with each other politically. In 2014, students from Hong Kong supported Taiwan's Sunflower Student Movement, and students from Taiwan supported the Umbrella Movement in Hong Kong. The 2018 murder by a Hong Kong citizen while in Taiwan caused the Hong Kong government to propose the Hong Kong extradition bill in 2019, which would have allowed suspected criminals to be extradited to not just Taiwan, but mainland China and Macau as well. This began massive protests in Hong Kong, with the government of Taiwan supporting the protesters, not wanting the proposal to become law. The government of Taiwan sees the extradition bill, now withdrawn, as an infringement of the one country, two systems principle, which has been the PRC's proposal for unification with Taiwan. Tens of thousands of Taiwanese citizens marched in Taipei on 29 September 2019 in support of Hong Kong's pro-democracy movement. Because of Taiwan's support of the protests, ROC flags have been frequently seen at protests.

=== Influence of Hong Kong's 2019 protests on Taiwan's 2020 presidential election ===
In the lead up to the 2020 Taiwanese presidential election, Han Kuo-yu of the Kuomintang (KMT) was favored over the incumbent president Tsai Ing-wen of the Democratic Progressive Party (DPP) because of the losses that the DPP suffered in the 2018 Taiwanese local election. In the 2018 local elections, the DPP lost mayoral elections in many important cities to the KMT, resulting in a strong victory for the KMT. This also proved welcome for China because the KMT favoured closer economic ties with the mainland, while the DPP aimed for a more independent Taiwan. Regardless of this, both the KMT and the DPP show similarities in terms of cross-strait relations and how both parties support independence. The DPP managed to pull through in the 2020 election to win the presidency and the control of majority of the Legislative Yuan thanks to improvements of the economy, the 2019-20 Hong Kong protests, and China's cross-strait unification plan.

In June 2019, large-scale protests in Hong Kong broke out in response to the 2019 Hong Kong extradition bill which was introduced on 29 March the same year. As the DPP aimed for a more independent Taiwan that is less reliant on the People's Republic of China (PRC), the Hong Kong protests became political leverage that helped her gain local and global support and recognition. In comparison, the KMT was much softer towards the idea of cross-strait relations with China. This proved fatal for the KMT in the 2020 presidential election as the DPP gained immense support from both their Taiwanese voters and Hong Kong sympathizers. Tsai's criticism and defiance towards Beijing's one country, two systems policy as well as her support towards the protesters in Hong Kong further helped her reclaim the support that the DPP had lost in the 2018 elections. This was especially the case when Tsai responded to Xi's New Year speech about Taiwan and unification with the mainland, which resulted in her approval ratings going up. Xi Jinping, General Secretary of the Chinese Communist Party, expressed in his speech how the two systems policy is the best solution to realizing a "peaceful reunification" of the mainland and Taiwan, just like how Hong Kong, in 1997, and Macau, in 1999, came under PRC control. In his speech, Xi says that unification will be beneficial to both sides in terms of opening up more opportunities for business, promoting the economy, and preserving peace. Xi also stated that China would respect Taiwan's current social system and that the private property, lawful rights and interests of Taiwan, and religious beliefs would be protected so as long as the PRC's development interests and its sovereignty over Taiwan is maintained.

After witnessing how the PRC handled the protests in Hong Kong as well as hearing Xi's speech, Tsai took a strong stance against the PRC and the unification plan by publicly rejecting the 1992 consensus. Tsai also strongly opposed the two systems policy being applied to Taiwan, wishing for the PRC to both recognize Taiwan as an independent country and to respect Taiwan's commitment towards freedom and democracy. In previous elections before the 2020 presidential election, Tsai spoke more cautiously about the PRC. Once she gained more support from Taiwanese citizens and people overseas however, she spoke more strongly against the PRC while also promoting her idea of an independent Taiwan, resulting in her win in the 2020 presidential election. Tsai's win in the election did not stop the PRC's plans to develop a strong and resolved cross-strait relationship with Taiwan. It was, however, seen as a booster to the Hong Kong protest by many of the anti-government protesters in Hong Kong. After witnessing Taiwan citizens taking part in Tsai's presidential win, some Hong Kong protesters expressed envy, saying that they too want the type of democracy that Taiwan citizens exemplified in the 2020 election.

=== Refugee Status ===
Article 18 of Taiwan's Laws and Regulations Regarding Hong Kong & Macao Affairs stipulates that "Necessary assistance shall be provided to Hong Kong or Macau Residents whose safety and liberty are immediately threatened for political reasons." The vagueness of "necessary assistance" that Taiwan is offering to those fleeing from Hong Kong can only help people who legally enter Taiwan. This is because Taiwan's policy regarding Article 18 does not provide a more detailed or precise procedure on how to deal with the situation when it appears.

Since the onset of the 2019–2020 Hong Kong protests, the question of refugee status has become an increasingly prominent issue in Hong Kong–Taiwan relations. Taiwan, which does not possess a formal refugee law, has faced growing calls from civil society and international observers to establish a legal framework to accommodate asylum seekers from Hong Kong. While President Tsai Ing-wen and the ruling Democratic Progressive Party (DPP) have expressed public support for the Hong Kong protest movement, concrete policy measures for refugees have been limited.

Joshua Wong, a politician from Hong Kong, has also traveled to Taiwan to meet with the government to discuss the potential for Hong Kong protesters to seek political asylum in Taiwan. Keith Fong Chung-yin, president of the Hong Kong Baptist University Student Union, also echoed Joshua Wong's remarks about the lack of an asylum process in Taiwan and says the DPP has not enacted specific laws to help refugees. Though Tsai Ing-wen, the president of Taiwan, has regularly supported the protesters on social media and said that Taiwan would provide Hongkongers with "necessary assistance," the government of Taiwan has not created a process for political refugees yet. Joseph Wu, Taiwan's Minister of Foreign Affairs, has said that existing legislation to deal with refugees is sufficient, even though a New York Times video has shown that some refugees from Hong Kong have entered Taiwan illegally, providing evidence that existing legislation is not sufficient. This was especially the case for many protesters since legally entering Taiwan proved difficult because of the Hong Kong police confiscating travel documents. It puts them into a situation where they would have to illegally enter Taiwan if they were to seek refuge there. A Hong Kong Free Press article mentions that people usually use speed boats to flee from Hong Kong to Taiwan. In response to the New York Times video, the Mainland Affairs Council warned protesters to not enter Taiwan illegally, and reiterated the statement that existing laws are sufficient, even though they only cover special cases, such as student, investment, and tourist visas. For student visas, Taiwan's Ministry of Education in November 2019 announced that university students in Hong Kong would be allowed to attend lectures and continue their studies in Taiwan. For refugees who do not qualify for student and investment visas, this lack of a formal asylum process means that they enter Taiwan on 30-day tourist visas and cannot legally work in Taiwan.

In contrast to the DPP's position of believing current laws are adequate, Han Kuo-yu, the Kuomintang's losing candidate for the 2020 Taiwan presidential election, has said that he fully supports the passage of a refugee law to help asylum seekers from Hong Kong. In addition, the New Power Party (NPP) in April 2020 requested that the DPP and Legislative Yuan pass a refugee act, as well as amend Article 18 so that procedures are clearly defined for political refugees from Hong Kong. As of May 2020, despite DPP President Tsai Ing-wen and Minister of Foreign Affairs Joseph Wu claiming that existing legislation is sufficient, no resident of Hong Kong of Macau has received official assistance from Taiwan under Article 18. Chairman of the KMT, Johnny Chiang, has also said that the DPP administration under Tsai has been vocal about helping those from Hong Kong but has failed to provide any meaningful help, and that legislation should be passed to grant political asylum to those from Hong Kong. In regards to the failure of the DPP to enact laws regarding this, Chiang also said that "Don't let 'supporting Hong Kong' only be a slogan of empty promises... Bring up your thoughts on legislation. Support Hong Kong with real actions."

Despite Taiwan's lack of progress on officially granting refugee status, some in Hong Kong have fled to Taiwan, including Causeway Bay Books founder Lam Wing-kee. Lam has said that Taiwan is the "last fortress" for Hong Kong residents against mainland Chinese oppression, and that young Hong Kongers should leave to Taiwan. However, without refugee laws in Taiwan, it is not clear on how young Hong Kongers would accomplish this; Lam himself fundraised US$200,000 for his new bookstore, which is the amount needed for an investment visa in Taiwan.

As Taiwan's Mainland Affairs Council does not provide assistance to those who flee to Taiwan, NGOs have taken a more active role in helping those people. Chè-lâm Presbyterian Church in Taiwan has assisted those fleeing from Hong Kong to Taiwan by providing shelter to them, as well as sending supplies to protesters still in Hong Kong. Goobear Chen, Chairman of the National Students' Union of Taiwan, says, "The fundamental mission of Taiwan NGOs is to put pressure on the government to amend the refugee law," as NGOs cannot provide assistance on a long-term basis, and lawfully admitting refugees would be most effective.

On 27 May 2020, President Tsai Ing-wen announced that a plan would be created to provide humanitarian support to those from Hong Kong. On 18 June 2020, the plan's details were revealed; a Taiwan-Hong Kong Service and Exchange Office is set to open on 1 July 2020 in Taipei under the THEC, which intends to work with human rights and civil groups to help people with basic living expenses, residency, settlement, employment, and protection issues. Any support from the office is to be provided only after people enter Taiwan. No announcement was made regarding implementation of a refugee/asylum law, and those seeking help are referred to by the government as "shelter seekers" rather than "refugees."

In late July 2020, 5 people from Hong Kong were found at sea by Taiwan's Coast Guard, drifting towards Pratas Island after their ship had run out of fuel. Hong Kong's security chief, John Lee, warned Taiwan against "harbouring criminals" and asked for the 5 to be returned to Hong Kong, despite the lack of an extradition agreement. On 26 August 2020, 12 people from Hong Kong were found by the mainland Chinese Coast Guard; in both incidents, the passengers are believed to have wanted to flee to Taiwan.

On 2 March 2021, dozens of people rallied at the Legislative Yuan in Taiwan, and made requests such as allowing political refugees from Hong Kong to flee to Taiwan.

According to Taiwan's National Immigration Agency (NIA), there has been an upward trend in residency permits for Hong Kongers moving to Taiwan under the 16 different programs for obtaining a residency permit. In 2018, there were 4,148 issued residency permits and an additional 1,090 permanent residency grants, and in 2019, 5,858 residency permits were issued along with 1,474 permanent residency grants. In 2020, 10,813 residency permits were issued with an additional 1,576 permanent residency grants. For 2021, 11,173 residency permits were issued, along with 1,685 permanent residency permits. An official from the NIA stated that the upward trend has a lot to do with the recent political situation in Hong Kong.

In February 2022, threatening letters were sent from Hong Kong to several Kuomintang politicians in Taiwan, including Ma Ying-jeou. The letters warned the politicians "not to stop our Hong Kong brothers and sisters from going to Taiwan"; in response, one of the politicians said that the Kuomintang had never advocated for the blocking Hong Kong citizens from going to Taiwan.

In May 2022, the DPP-led government, announced that it would indefinitely delay plans to allow professionals from Hong Kong and Macau to acquire permanent residency or citizenship in Taiwan, citing fears of potential espionage activity by mainland Chinese. DPP lawmaker Lo Chih-cheng said that it would be difficult to determine who was a "real" Hong Kong or Macau citizen when compared to "people working for Beijing". According to Al Jazeera and Hong Kong Free Press, lawmakers from the DPP and NPP were the most vocal regarding potential security risks from people from Hong Kong and Macau, whereas there were no objections from the KMT. Historically, the KMT government in Taiwan had considered those from Hong Kong and Macau as compatriots rather than foreigners, granting them extra privileges compared to other foreigners, to try to attract them to Taiwan. One application was denied for "suspected of endangering national interests" on the basis of the applicant having previously worked for a public university. Chiu Chui-cheng, deputy minister of the Mainland Affairs Council, said in June 2022 that "We in Taiwan, also have national security needs".

In August 2022, Lam Wing-kee met with Nancy Pelosi in Taiwan and discussed the possibility of permitting some Hong Kong citizens to move to the United States, due to the difficulty of them getting identity cards and citizenship in Taiwan.

In October 2022, Taiwan's MAC said that although 70 applicants for residency were rejected along with their appeals, the number of people who failed national security screening were extremely low, and that Taiwan would support the "determination of Hongkongers in fighting for freedom and democracy."

== Cultural and economic relations ==
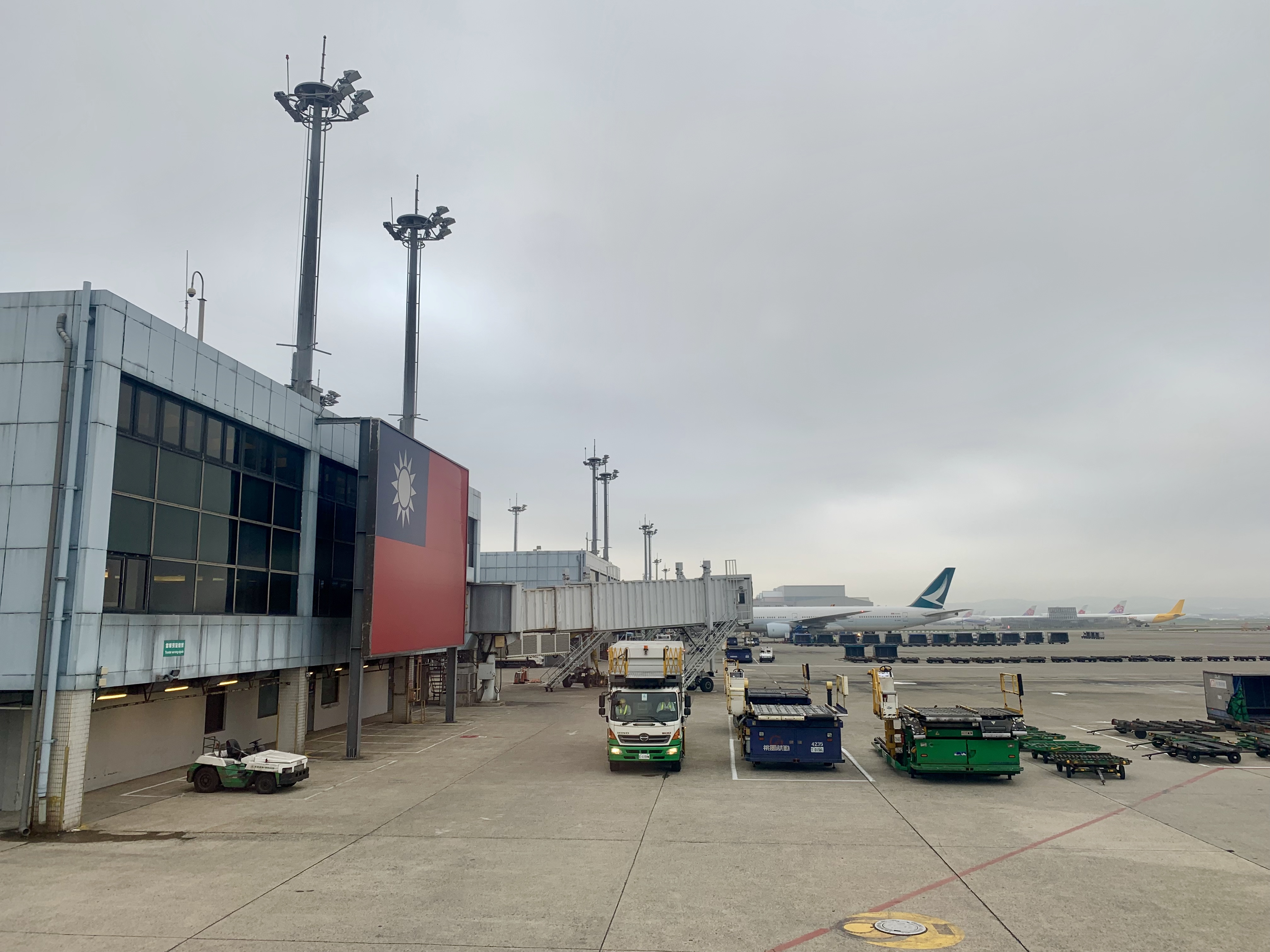
Cathay Pacific aircraft in Taoyuan International Airport in Taiwan

Culturally, though the primary regional language of Hong Kong is Cantonese and the primary language of Taiwan is Mandarin, both regions continue to use traditional Chinese characters, in contrast to simplified Chinese characters.

In Hong Kong, newspapers were often dated using the Republic of China calendar, even after 1949. Hong Kong's Leisure and Cultural Services Department (LCSD) apologized in 2017 after it had deleted the ROC year ("66th year of the Republic of China") from a Hong Kong newspaper clipping from 1977. Football players from Hong Kong, such as Lam Sheung Yee, frequently represented the Republic of China football team, and the gold medal-winning ROC football team of the 1958 Asian Games was primarily composed of Hong Kongers.

As a result of the war, no direct flights were allowed between Taiwan and mainland China; thus many passengers transferred through Hong Kong until 2003, when the cross-strait charter was created. Travel between nationals of the two regions is popular; in 2018, there were approximately 1.7 million nationals of Taiwan who traveled to Hong Kong, the third-most destination after Japan (4.8 million) and mainland China (4.1 million). These 1.7 million nationals represented Hong Kong's second-most inbound tourists, only after tourists from mainland China. In the opposite direction, Taiwan was Hong Kong's third-most popular destination, with over 1 million visitors per year.

Non-stop flights are operated between Hong Kong and Taipei (Taoyuan), Taichung, Tainan, and Kaohsiung airports.

Hong Kong and Taiwan invested heavily in education and infrastructure after World War II, causing both economies to significantly improve and be part of the Four Asian Tigers.

Total trade value between Taiwan and Hong Kong was more than US$64 billion in 2021.

Mainland Chinese authorities have warned Hong Kong actors against attending Taiwan's Golden Horse Film Awards.

== See also ==
- Cross-strait relations
- Foreign relations of Hong Kong
- Foreign relations of Taiwan
- Pro-ROC camp (Hong Kong)
- Sun Yat Sen Memorial Park
- Dr Sun Yat Sen Museum
- Dr Sun Yat-sen Historical Trail
- Hung Lau
