= Red House (Hong Kong) =

Coordinates: 22.37767°N 113.95970°E

The Red House
- 紅樓
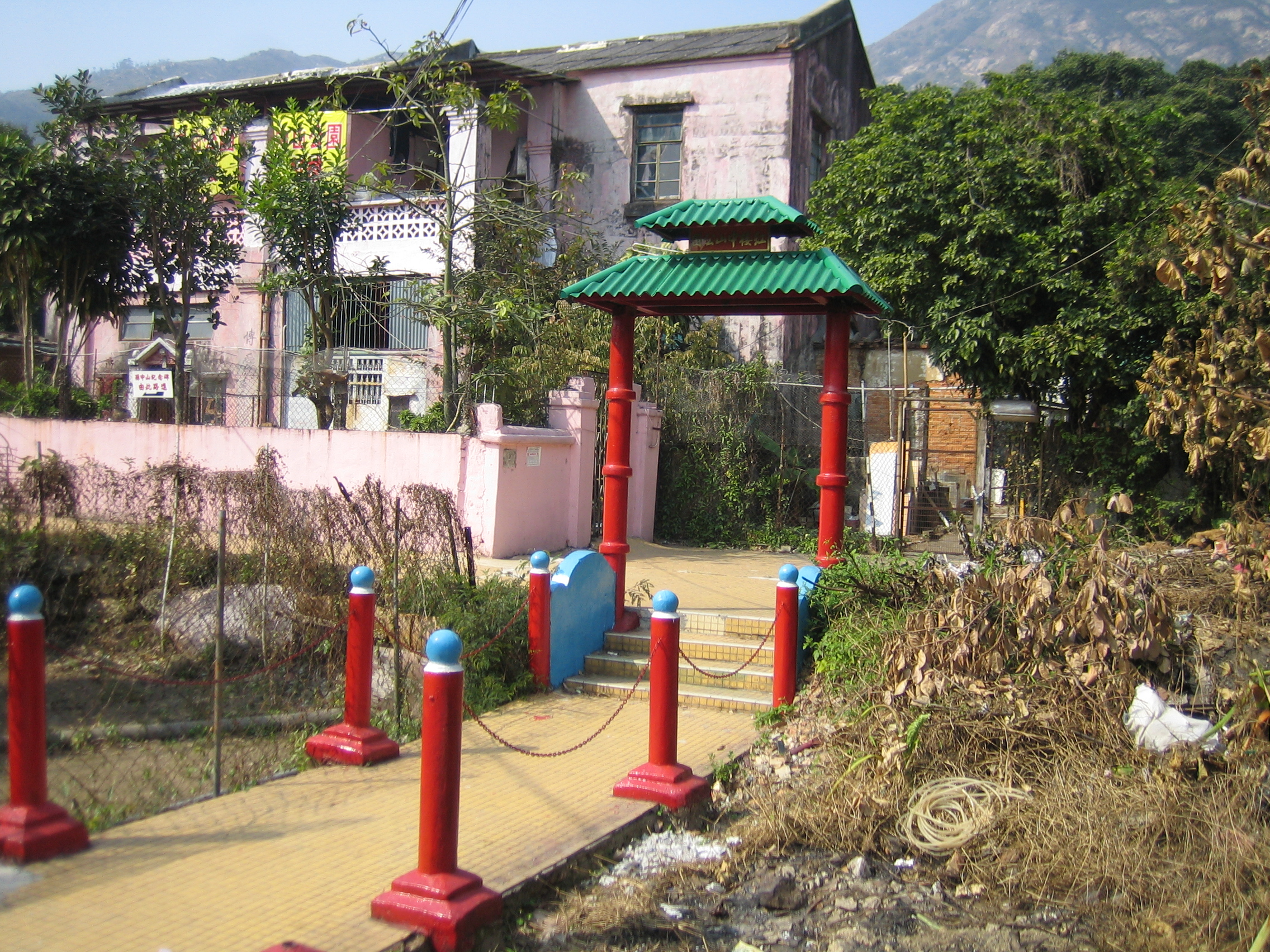
- Hung Lau
- Interactive map of the The Red House area
- Alternative names: Hung Lau

General information
- Classification: Grade I declared monument
- Location: Pak Kok, Tuen Mun, Hong Kong SAR, China
- Groundbreaking: 1905; 121 years ago
- Completed: 1910; 116 years ago

Design and construction
- Known for: Outpost of the Revive China Society

Red House
- Traditional Chinese: 紅樓
- Literal meaning: Red House
Transcriptions
Yue: Cantonese
- Yale Romanization: Hùhng làuh
- Jyutping: Hung4 lau4

Hung Lau is a house built between 1905 and 1910 on former farmland in Pak Kok, Tuen Mun, Hong Kong. It was used by the Revive China Society (興中會) as a base for revolutionary activities against the Qing dynasty.

== Nature and locale ==
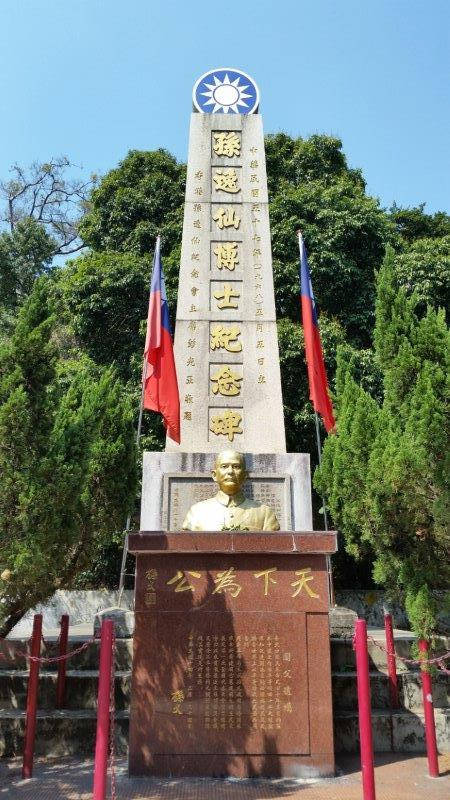
Obelisk at Sun Yat Sen Commemorative Garden, Tuen Mun

It is a Grade I historic building since 2009, a classification which does not mandate preservation. It is named for its red-pigmented external surface rendering. The two-storey house is a mix of Chinese and Western influences. It is near the Tuen Mun Public Riding School, Butterfly Estate and Castle Peak.

== History ==
Hong Kong merchant and financier of the original China Daily Li Ki-tong, who met Dr. Sun Yat-sen in 1895 and joined the Revive China Society in 1900, provided his farm to the Society as its secret base in 1901. The farm provided cover and sustenance to the group for the planning of its coup attempts in Guangzhou and Wuhan.

In 1968, a proposal was made by lawmaker Ellen Li, specifying that a memorial garden and museum be set up in the area. The proposal was declined because British colonial officials did not want to collaborate with the pro-ROC Sun Yat-sen Memorial Association of Hong Kong, a group which made repeated requests for the conservation of the site. In the 1990s and early 2000s, the District Council of Tuen Mun proposed spending HKD $86M to restore the area, but it did not move forward.

The house and garden remained in the Li family as of 2011 but was subject of a controversial sale to a mainlander in November 2016 for HKD $5M. In February 2017, 300 people protested the demolition of a wall by the new owner. It was declared a proposed monument by the Antiquities Advisory Board on 9 March 2017 to protect the building from further modifications and damages, for a period of one full year. In October 2017, the owner applied for a subsidy from the government, which mandated that the building should not be demolished or sold 10 years after restoration. In December 2017, the government decided to not promote the building as a declared monument, due to lack of concrete evidence linking the building to the 1911 revolution.

Since the Double Tenth Festival in 2018, celebrations of the Republic of China National Day and Establishment Day have been blocked by the owner, saying participants are not allowed to enter the grounds on those days. During 2018's National Day, approximately 350 people were turned away from the area.

On 10 October 2020, several police vans were parked outside of the area, and about a dozen plainclothes policemen checked IDs of visitors to the site. According to Johnny Mak, he had never seen this before, and said police presence was used to deter people from gathering there due to the National Security Law. In addition, private security guards in dark suits were hired by the owner to block off the area from any visitors. One such blocked visitor said that he had entered the site for more than 30 years. SCMP noted that the area where the National Day celebrations usually took place were now filled with plants and thorns, making celebrations impossible even if access were not blocked.

In September 2021, Chris Tang claimed that celebrations in Hong Kong for Double Ten day could risk breaching the national security law. On 10 October 2021, the Red House was again blocked by dozens of police and private security guards.

== Sun Yat-sen Commemorative Garden ==
Lying on the same plot of land and adjacent to the house is a garden commemorating Dr. Sun Yat-sen and one of few places in Hong Kong where the flag of the Republic of China is hoisted continuously. It was built in 1983, and contains an obelisk and statue of Sun Yat-sen.

The garden has been vandalized several times; in 2002, the statue or Dr. Sun Yat-sen was vandalized, and three Arenga trees were cut down. In 2014, the statue and monument were vandalized again, the signboard and a few steles were broken, and many Republic of China flags were torn.

In December 2020, the garden was vandalized again; five commemorative plates were spray-painted on and flag poles for the Republic of China flag were removed. Johnny Mak stated that he believed the damage could only have been done with the approval of the site's owner.

According to Johnny Mak, District Councillor of Yuen Long, ceremonies have happened at the garden and Hung Lau every January 1 (Establishment Day) and October 10th (National Day) since 1968, with Mak currently serving as the primary organizer of the October 10th ceremonies. Mak is the chairman of the Highwise Yuen Long Service Centre, the group that manages the memorial garden. Ceremonies have been attended by pro-ROC people, as well as officials from the Chung Hwa Travel Service, the precursor of TECO in Hong Kong.

== See also ==
- List of Grade I historic buildings in Hong Kong
- Dr Sun Yat-sen Historical Trail
- Dr Sun Yat-sen Museum
- Sun Yat Sen Memorial Park
- Hong Kong-Taiwan relations
