= Taipei Economic and Cultural Office, Macau =

Political representative office in Sé, Macau, China

Taipei Economic and Cultural Office in Macau 臺北經濟文化辦事處
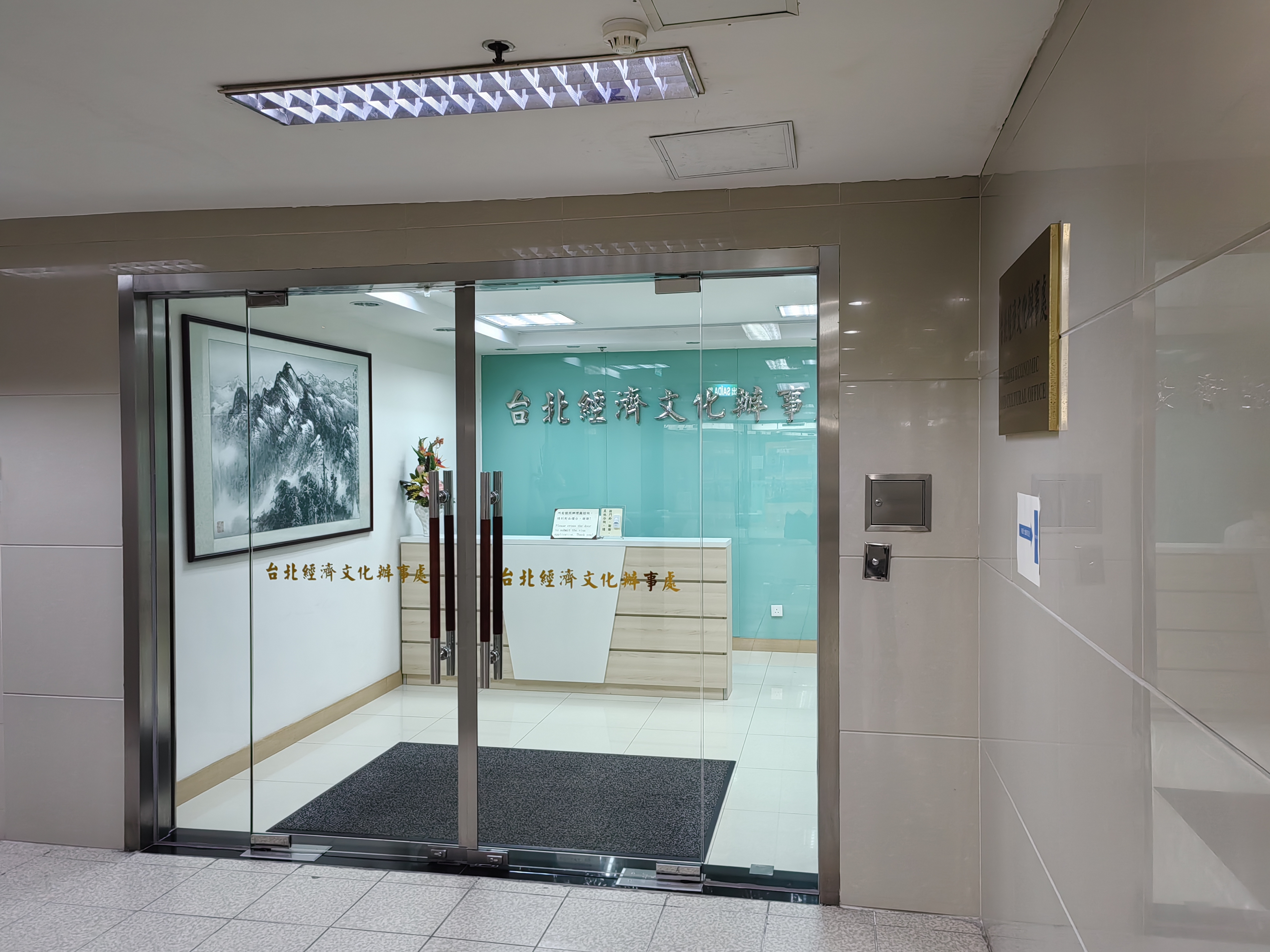
- Address: Sé, Macau, China
- Coordinates: 22°11′24″N 113°32′56″E
- Opening: 1989 (as Taipei Trade and Tourism Office in Macau); 19 July 2011 (as TECO)
- Jurisdiction: Macau
- Website: Official website (in Chinese)

Taipei Economic and Cultural Office, Macau
- Traditional Chinese: 臺北經濟文化辦事處
- Simplified Chinese: 台北经济文化办事处
Transcriptions
Standard Mandarin
- Hanyu Pinyin: Táiběi Jīngjì Wénhuà Bànshìchù
Yue: Cantonese
- Jyutping: toi4 bak1 ging1 zai3 man4 faa3 baan6 si6 cyu3

The Taipei Economic and Cultural Office in Macau (TECO; Chinese: 臺北經濟文化辦事處; pinyin: Táiběi Jīngjì Wénhuà Bànshìchù) is the representative office of the Republic of China in Macau. Its counterpart body in Taiwan is the Macau Economic and Cultural Office in Taiwan.

The office is located at Dynasty Plaza building in Sé.

== History ==
Until 1967, the Republic of China was represented in Portuguese Macau by the Special Commissariat of the Ministry of Foreign Affairs of the Republic of China. However, following the 12-3 incident in 1966, the Portuguese government agreed to close it down, as well as ban all pro-Kuomintang activities. As a result, the opening of the then Taipei Trade and Tourism Office prompted concerns from the local branch of the Xinhua News Agency, the People's Republic of China's de facto mission in Macau, which threatened to protest to the Macau authorities "if anything went wrong".

In 1989, the Taipei Trade and Tourism Office was opened. In 1999, it was renamed to the Taipei Economic and Cultural Center in Macau (Chinese: 臺北經濟文化中心; pinyin: Táiběi Jīngjì Wénhuà Zhōngxīn). In 2011, it was then renamed to the Taipei Economic and Cultural Office in Macau.

In September 2022, SCMP reported that the government of Macau would stop renewing visas to employees of the office from Taiwan unless they signed a pledge recognizing the one-China principle, similar to what the Hong Kong government had earlier asked Taiwan to do at the Taipei Economic and Cultural Office in Hong Kong. Taiwan's Mainland Affairs Council said the pledge was not part of a 2011 agreement between the governments of Taiwan and Macau, and therefore would not sign the pledge. Taiwan's Mainland Affairs Council owns the Sun Yat Sen Memorial House in Macau, and has anticipated that Beijing will seize the property if no employees from Taiwan are allowed in Macau.

== Opening ==
The official opening of the office under its new current name was unveiled on 19 July 2011 by the Minister of Mainland Affairs Council of the Republic of China Lai Shin-yuan. The renaming however was done prior to the official office launch under the new name on 4 July 2011.

== Transportation ==
In the future, the office will be served from Jardim das Artes Station of the Macau LRT.

== See also ==
- Cross-Strait relations
- Taipei Economic and Cultural Office in Hong Kong
- List of diplomatic missions of Taiwan
- One-China policy
