= Lin Chen-kuo =

Taiwanese politician

- 林振國

Chairperson of the Taiwan–Hong Kong Economic and Cultural Co-operation Council
- In office May 2010 – 15 April 2013
- Preceded by: Office established
- Succeeded by: Johnnason Liu

Minister of Finance of the Republic of China
- In office 27 February 1993 – 10 June 1996
- Preceded by: Bai Pei-ying
- Succeeded by: Paul Chiu

Personal details
- Born: 9 December 1937 (age 88)
- Education: National Taiwan University (BA); Oklahoma State University; Harvard University (MA)

Lin Chen-kuo (Chinese: 林振國; pinyin: Lín Zhènguó; born 9 December 1937) is a Taiwanese politician who served as Minister of Finance between 1993 and 1996. He later chaired the Taiwan–Hong Kong Economic and Cultural Co-operation Council from 2010 to 2013.

== Early life and career ==
Lin was born in 1937. His father, who had moved to Taiwan with an elder brother, was killed in the 228 Incident. As a result, an aunt helped his mother raise Lin and his eight siblings. Under their influence, Lin became a Christian. After high school, he graduated from National Taiwan University with a bachelor's degree in economics in 1950. He then studied economics in the United States at Oklahoma State University from 1966 to 1967 and then at Harvard University from 1973 to 1974.

== Political career ==
Shirley Kuo found Lin his first government job. He later led the finance departments of Taipei City Government and Taiwan Provincial Government. He was named finance minister under Premier Lien Chan in February 1993. Lin stepped down in June 1996, accepting an appointment as minister without portfolio. He later served as president of the China External Trade Development Council, leaving that position to head the newly established Taiwan Asset Management Company. In November 2009, Lin was named to the board of the Taiwan High Speed Rail Corporation, serving concurrently as chair of the company's audit committee. In 2010, the Taiwan–Hong Kong Economic and Cultural Co-operation Council was founded, and Lin became its first chairman.
