= Hong Kong Economic, Trade and Cultural Office (Taiwan) =

Political representative office in Taipei, Taiwan

- 香港經濟貿易文化辦事處
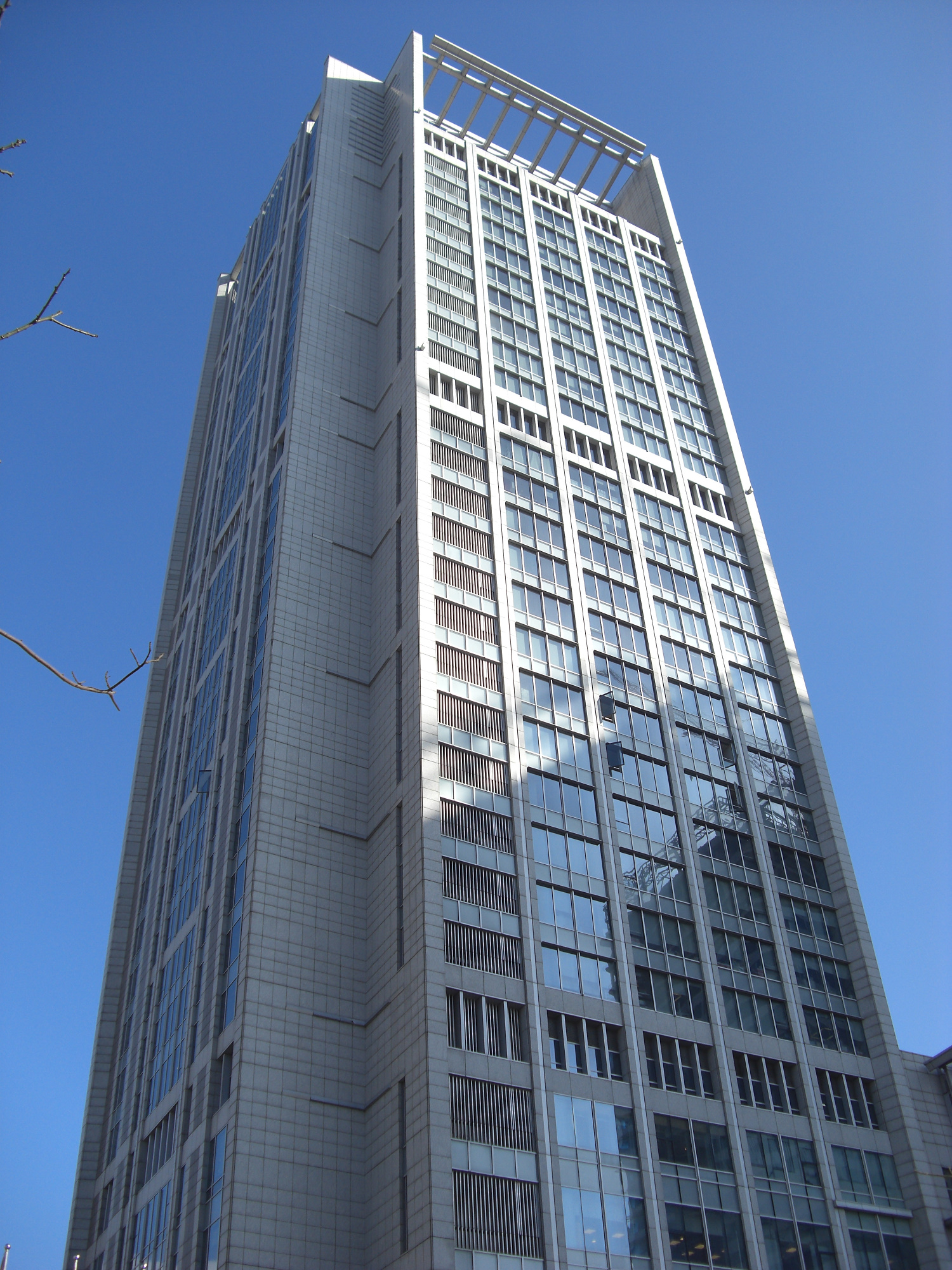
- Hong Kong Economic, Trade and Cultural Office at the President International Tower

Agency overview
- Formed: 19 December 2011 (start of operation); 15 May 2012 (inauguration)
- Dissolved: 18 May 2021 (suspended operation)
- Jurisdiction: Republic of China
- Headquarters: Xinyi, Taipei, Taiwan; 25°02′23″N 121°33′56″E
- Agency executive: John Leung, Director
- Website: www.hketco.hk

Hong Kong Economic, Trade and Cultural Office
- Traditional Chinese: 香港經濟貿易文化辦事處
- Simplified Chinese: 香港经济贸易文化办事处
Transcriptions
Standard Mandarin
- Hanyu Pinyin: Xiānggǎng Jīngjì Màoyì Wénhuà Bànshìchù
Yue: Cantonese
- Yale Romanization: Hēung góng gīng jai mauh yihk màhn fa baahn sih chyu
- Jyutping: Hoeng^{1} gong^{2} ging^{1} zai^{3} mau^{6} jik^{6} man^{4} faa^{3} baan^{6} si^{6} cyu^{3}

The Hong Kong Economic, Trade and Cultural Office (HKETCO; Chinese: 香港經濟貿易文化辦事處) was the representative office of Hong Kong in the Republic of China. Its counterpart body in Hong Kong is the Taipei Economic and Cultural Office in Hong Kong.

The office was located at the President International Tower in Xinyi District, Taipei.

== History ==
The office started to operate in Taiwan on 19 December 2011. On 15 May 2012, Minister of Mainland Affairs Council of the Republic of China Lai Shin-yuan oversaw the opening ceremony of the office. Also present during the opening ceremony was John Tsang, Financial Secretary of the Hong Kong SAR. He said during his opening note that Taiwan and Hong Kong have made substantial progress in the area of economic exchanges, cultural exchanges, financial supervision cooperation, bilateral transportation arrangement and cargo transshipment. The office suspended operation on 18 May 2021.

== List of directors ==
1. John Leung (7 December 2011 – 11 August 2015)
2. Rex Chang (12 August 2015 – 28 July 2018)

== Transportation ==
The office is accessible within walking distance south of Taipei City Hall Station of the Taipei Metro.

== See also ==
- Hong Kong–Taiwan Economic and Cultural Co-operation and Promotion Council
- Taiwan–Hong Kong Economic and Cultural Co-operation Council
- Hong Kong Economic and Trade Office
- Foreign relations of Hong Kong
- List of diplomatic missions in Taiwan
- Cross-Strait relations
- One-China policy
- Macau Economic and Cultural Office
