= Taiwan–Hong Kong Economic and Cultural Co-operation Council =

Representatives of Taiwan government

Coordinates: 25°02′33″N 121°31′11″E

- 財團法人臺港經濟文化合作策進會

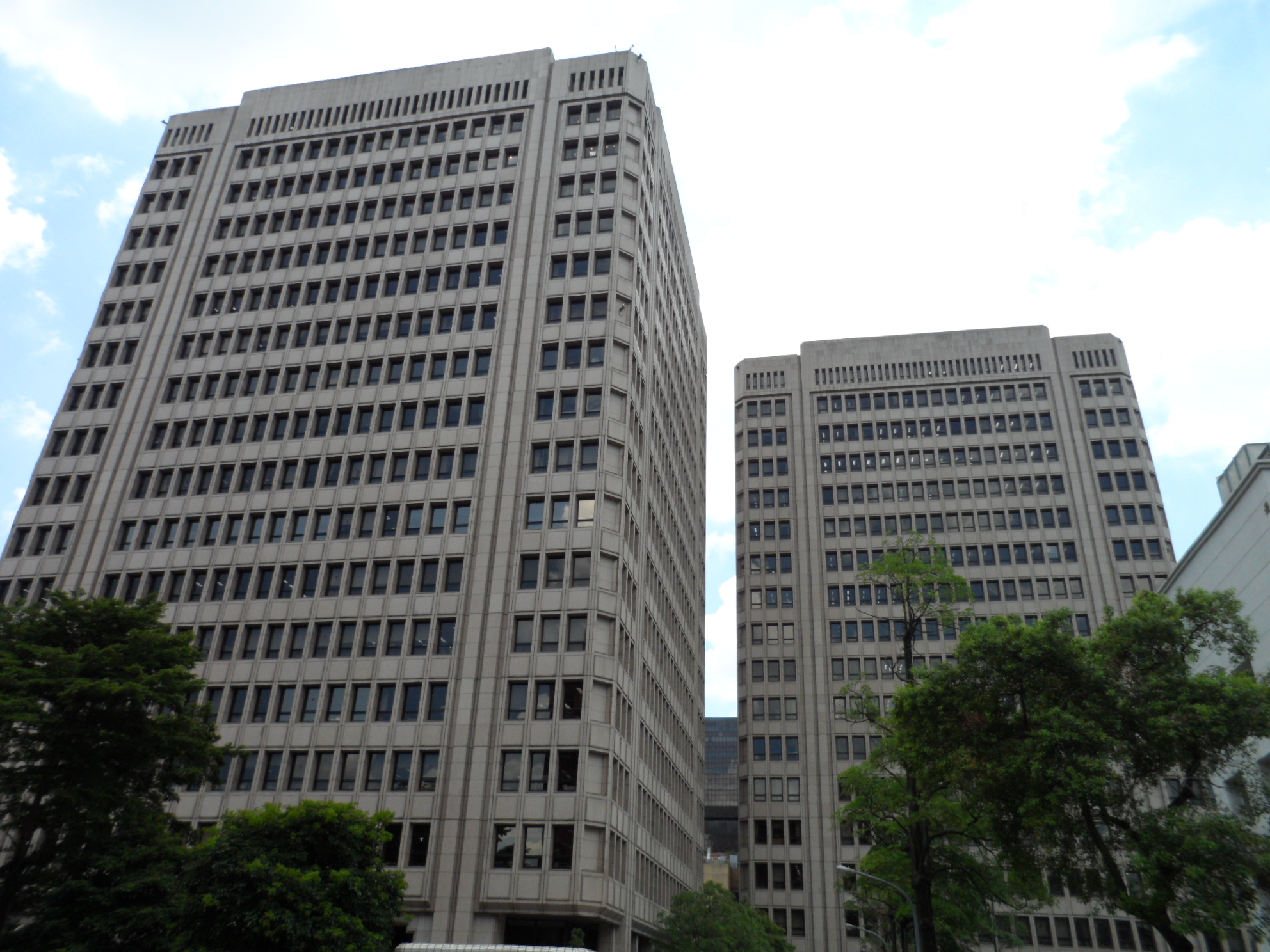

Agency overview
- Formed: May 2010
- Jurisdiction: Republic of China
- Headquarters: Zhongzheng, Taipei, Taiwan
- Minister responsible: Lin Chu-chia, Chairperson; Vice Chairperson; Chen Ming-jen, Secretary-General
- Website: www.thec.org.tw (in Chinese)

Taiwan–Hong Kong Economic and Cultural Co-operation Council
- Traditional Chinese: 財團法人臺港經濟文化合作策進會
Transcriptions
Standard Mandarin
- Hanyu Pinyin: Cáituán Fǎrén Tái–Gǎng Jīngjì Wénhuà Hézuò Cèjìn Huì
Yue: Cantonese
- Jyutping: coi^{4} tyun^{4} faat^{3} jan^{4} toi^{4} gong^{2} ging^{1} zai^{3} man^{4} faa^{3} hap^{6} zok^{3} caak^{3} zeon^{3} wui^{6}

The Taiwan–Hong Kong Economic and Cultural Co-operation Council (THEC; Chinese: 財團法人臺港經濟文化合作策進會; pinyin: Cáituán Fǎrén Tái–Gǎng Jīngjì Wénhuà Hézuò Cèjìn Huì) represents the government of Taiwan in talks with Hong Kong, through its counterpart the Hong Kong–Taiwan Economic and Cultural Co-operation and Promotion Council (ECCPC).

The THEC was set up in May 2010 in a symbiotic relationship with the Hong Kong ECCPC, similar to that between bodies representing Taiwan and mainland China in cross-strait talks, under a slightly hands-off approach that is often known as the "white glove" policy. The two councils, both with participation by high-ranking ministers, are incorporated as legal entities but will be authorised by the two governments to sign pacts.

The two bodies were established against a background of strengthened Hong Kong-Taiwan links and trade, which match improved China-Taiwan relations.

The THEC has two major committees, one on cultural and one on economic co-operation. This reflects Taiwan's broadbrush approach to its relationship with Hong Kong, and contrasts with the narrower business focus of the Hong Kong side.

== Chairpersons ==
- Lin Chen-kuo (May 2010 – 15 April 2013)
- Johnnason Liu (16 April 2013 – August 2014)
- Lin Chu-chia (August 2014 –)

== Transportation ==
The council is accessible within walking distance South West of Shandao Temple Station of the Taipei Metro.

== See also ==
- Political status of Taiwan
- Hong Kong–Taiwan Economic and Cultural Co-operation and Promotion Council
- Economic Cooperation Framework Agreement
- Republic of China diplomatic missions
- Diplomatic missions in Hong Kong
- Hong Kong Economic, Trade and Cultural Office
