= Consulate General of Nepal, Hong Kong =

Diplomatic Mission of Nepal in Hong Kong

- नेपाली महावाणिज्यदूतावास, हङकङ
- Location: Hong Kong (China)
- Address: Unit 715, 7th Floor, Concordia Plaza, 1 Science Museum Road, East TST
- Coordinates: 22°18′06.8″N 114°10′43.0″E
- Jurisdiction: Hong Kong (SAR); Macau (SAR)
- Consul General: Satish Gurung
- Website: Official website

The Consulate General of Nepal in Hong Kong (Nepali: नेपाली महावाणिज्यदूतावास, हङकङ; Chinese: 尼泊尔驻香港总领事馆) is the diplomatic consular mission of the Federal Democratic Republic of Nepal in the Hong Kong Special Administrative Region of the People's Republic of China. Its jurisdiction covers the special administrative regions of Hong Kong and Macau for both consular and administrative affairs.

The Consulate is located in Unit 715, 7th Floor, North Tower, Concordia Plaza, No. 1 Science Museum Road, Tsim Sha Tsui (East), Kowloon, Hong Kong. It focuses mainly on economic, cultural and diaspora affairs and acts as a vital link between Nepal and the Nepali diaspora in the region. It is responsible for facilitating trade and chanelling infrastructural investment to Nepal from the global trade market of Hong Kong and Macau.

== History ==
Prior to the transfer of sovereignty over Hong Kong to the People's Republic of China by the United Kingdom in 1997, Nepalese consular representations were handled by the Royal Nepalese Liaison Office. Following the handover, the Liaison Office was officially converted into Consulate General under the framework of the Vienna Convention on Consular Relations to maintain direct diplomatic channels.

The presence of consulate is heavily related with the history of the Nepali diaspora in Hong Kong many of whom trace their roots to the British Army's Brigade of Gurkhas stationed into the territory during the colonial era.

== Objectives and Functions ==
The main objective of the Consulate General is to extend consular and administrative footprint over the special administrative regions of Hong Kong and Macau.

The mission mainly focuses on labor and diaspora support, consular affairs, trade and financial investment, and tourism promotion.

== See also ==
- List of diplomatic missions of Nepal
- List of consular missions in Hong Kong
- Gurkha regiment
- China-Nepal relations
