= Macau Economic and Cultural Office (Taiwan) =

Political representative office in Xinyi, Taipei, Taiwan

- Delegação Económica e Cultural de Macau 澳門經濟文化辦事處
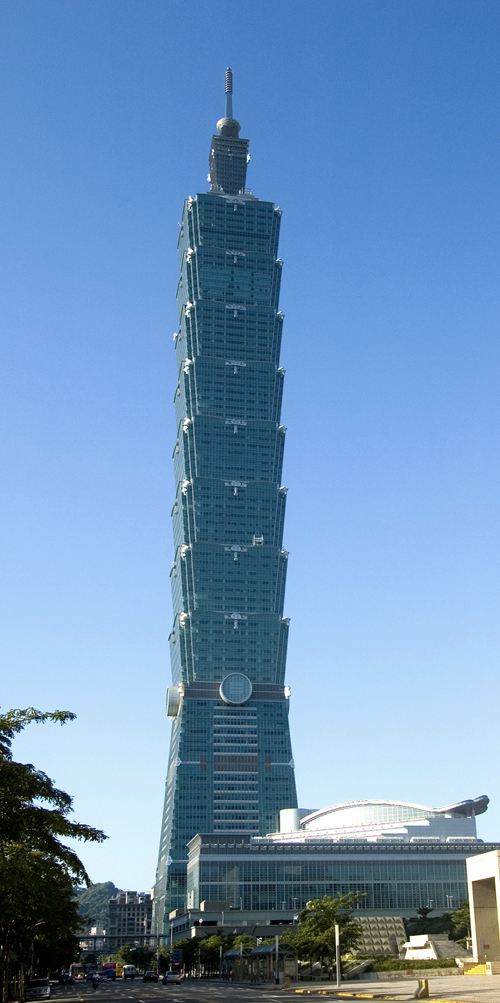
- Taipei 101 where the Macau Economic and Cultural Office is located

Agency overview
- Formed: 19 December 2011 (start of operation); 13 May 2012 (inauguration)
- Dissolved: 19 June 2021 (suspended operation)
- Headquarters: Xinyi, Taipei, Taiwan; 25°02′01″N 121°33′53″E
- Agency executive: Leung Kit Chi, Director
- Website: Official website (in Chinese)

The Macau Economic and Cultural Office (traditional Chinese: 澳門經濟文化辦事處; simplified Chinese: 澳门经济文化办事处; pinyin: Àomén Jīngjì Wénhuà Bànshì Chù; Portuguese: Delegação Económica e Cultural de Macau) is the representative office of Macau in the Republic of China. Its counterpart body in Macau is the Taipei Economic and Cultural Office in Macau.

The office is located at Taipei 101 in Xinyi District, Taipei.

== Objectives ==
The purpose of the office is to provide services and assistance to Macau residents who work, study, travel, conduct business, live or may encounter emergencies in Taiwan. It also promotes exchanges and cooperation between Macau and Taiwan in trade, tourism, technology, environmental protection, education, health, cultural activities, academic publishing, technical specialty, social welfare and other areas.

== History ==
On 13 May 2012, Lai celebrated the opening ceremony of Macau Economic and Cultural Office in Taiwan. Lai was accompanied by Cheong U, Secretary for Social Affairs and Culture of the Macau SAR. Lai added that the office establishment resulted from the principle of goodwill and reciprocity held by both sides and it was considered a milestone in the development for bilateral relation between Taiwan and Macau. On 16 June 2021, the office announced it will suspend its operation indefinitely starting 19 June 2021.

== Director ==
- Leung Kit Chi

== Transportation ==
The office is accessible within walking distance South of Taipei City Hall Station of Taipei Metro.

== See also ==
- Foreign relations of Macau
- List of diplomatic missions in Taiwan
- Cross-Strait relations
- One-China policy
- Hong Kong Economic, Trade and Cultural Office
