= Taipei Economic and Cultural Office, Hong Kong =

Taipei Economic and Cultural Office in Hong Kong 臺北經濟文化辦事處
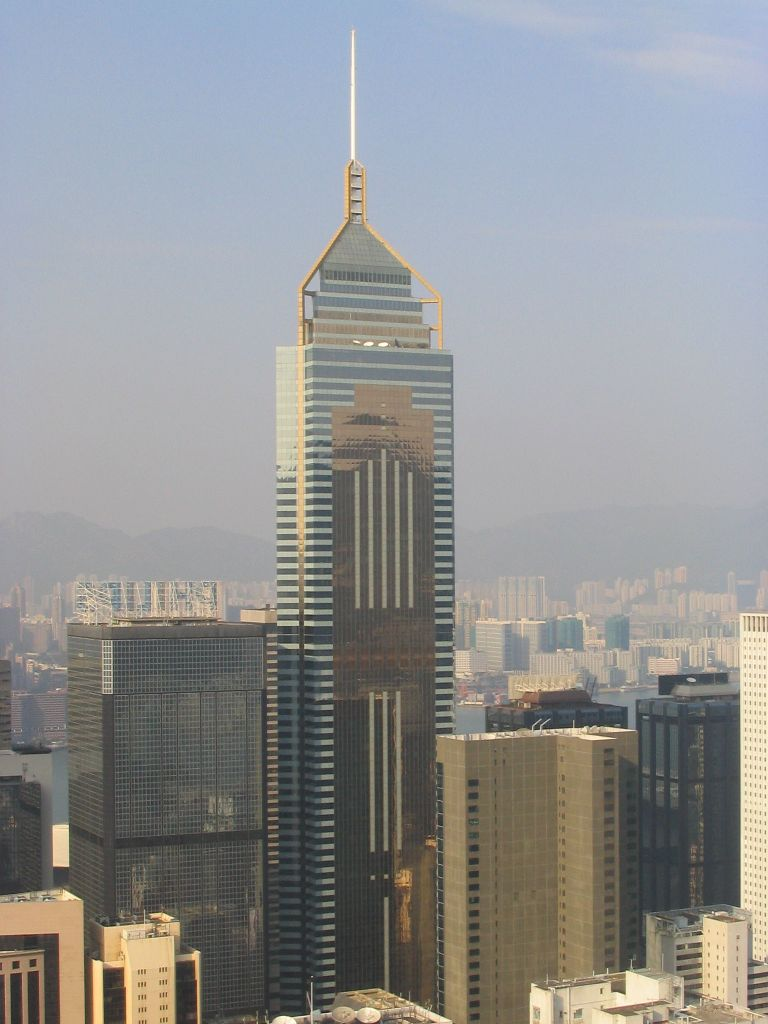
- Central Plaza in April 2003
- Location: Wan Chai, Hong Kong
- Address: Suite 4907, 49/F, Central Plaza, 18 Harbour Road, Wan Chai, Hong Kong
- Coordinates: 22°16′48″N 114°10′25″E
- Jurisdiction: Hong Kong
- Consul General: Vacant
- Website: Official website (in Chinese)

Taipei Economic and Cultural Office, Hong Kong
- Traditional Chinese: 臺北經濟文化辦事處
- Simplified Chinese: 台北经济文化办事处
Transcriptions
Standard Mandarin
- Hanyu Pinyin: Táiběi Jīngjì Wénhuà Bànshìchù
Yue: Cantonese
- Yale Romanization: Tòih bāk gīng jai màhn fa baahn sih chyu
- Jyutping: Toi4 bak1 ging1 zai3 man4 faa3 baan6 si6 cyu3

Chung Hwa Travel Service
- Traditional Chinese: 中華旅行社
- Simplified Chinese: 中华旅行社
Transcriptions
Standard Mandarin
- Hanyu Pinyin: Zhōnghuá Lǚxíngshè
Yue: Cantonese
- Yale Romanization: Jūng wàh léuih hàhng séh
- Jyutping: Zung1 waa4 leoi5 hang4 se5

The Taipei Economic and Cultural Office in Hong Kong (TECO) is the representative office of the Republic of China (Taiwan) in Hong Kong.

The de facto diplomatic mission is administratively under the Mainland Affairs Council, Executive Yuan. Still, it also houses departments that serve as outposts of the National Immigration Agency and the Bureau of Consular Affairs (Ministry of Foreign Affairs).

Its cultural arm, Kwang Hwa Information and Culture Centre, is an overseas agency of the Ministry of Culture.

The General Manager of TECO is also the Director of the Bureau of Hong Kong Affairs in the Mainland Affairs Council of the Executive Yuan. The founding director of the office was Susie Chiang Su-hui.

Previously located at Tower 1, Lippo Centre in Admiralty, the office has been relocated to Central Plaza in Wan Chai since December 2021.

== History ==
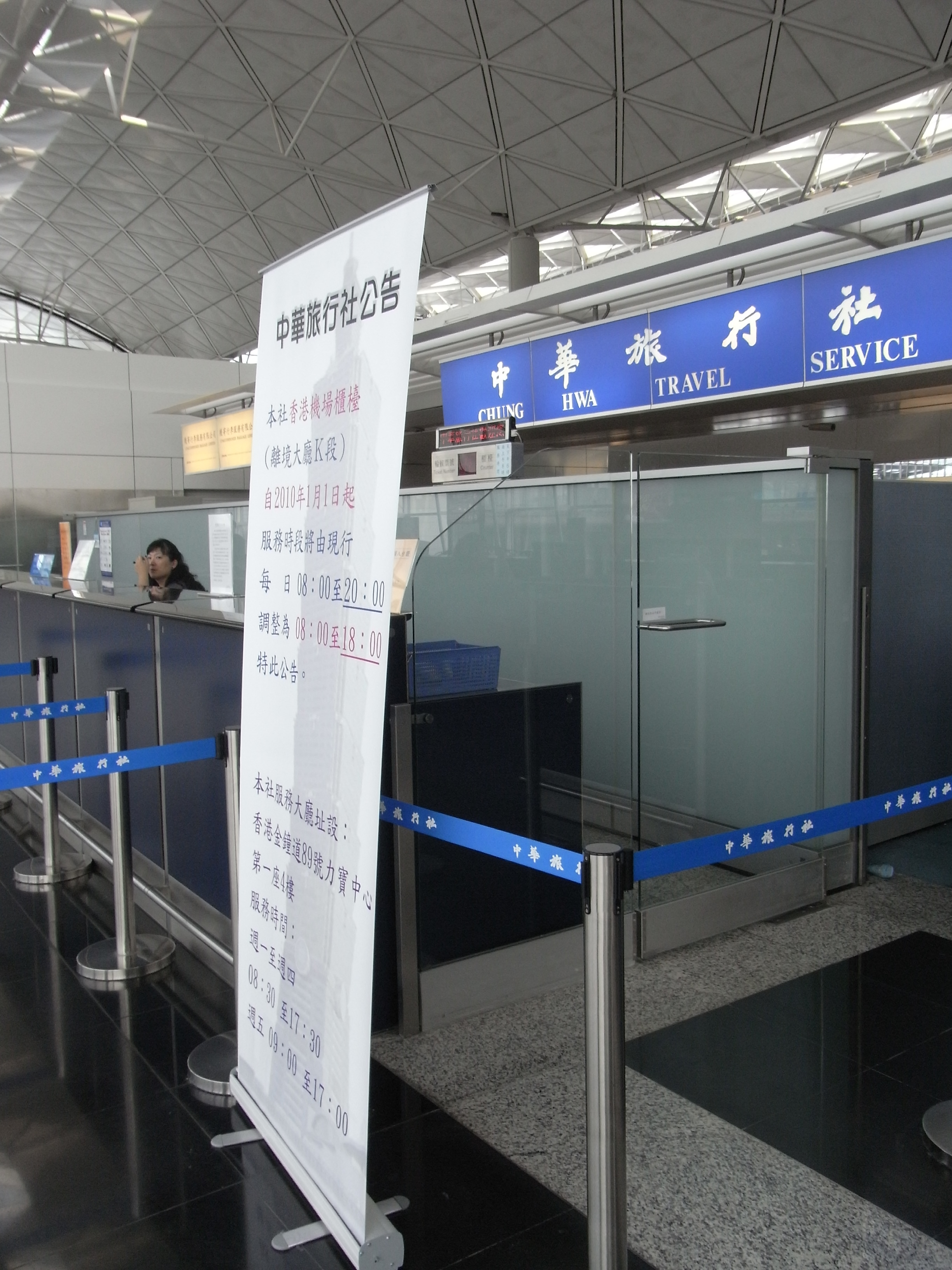
Chung Hwa Travel Service counters, Hong Kong Airport Terminal 1

The Taipei Economic and Cultural Office in Hong Kong, initially known as Chung Hwa Travel Service (Chinese: 中華旅行社), was first established in Hong Kong in 1966 during British rule. This operated under quasi-diplomatic arrangements unilaterally extended by the British authorities.

Previously, while the National Government of the Republic of China in Nanjing had negotiated with the British regarding the appointment of a Consul-General in 1945, it decided against such an appointment, with its representative in the colony, T W Kwok (Kuo Teh-hua) instead being styled Special Commissioner for Hong Kong. This was in addition to his role as Special Commissioner for Guangdong and Guangxi.

Disagreements also arose with the British authorities, with the Governor, Alexander Grantham, opposing an office building for the "Commissioner for Foreign Affairs of the Provinces of Kwantung and Kuangsi" being erected on the site of the Walled City in Kowloon.

In 1950, following British recognition of the People's Republic of China, the office of the Special Commissioner was closed, and Kwok withdrew.

Following the transfer of sovereignty to the People's Republic of China in 1997, the Service continued to operate, despite not having been officially registered with the Hong Kong SAR Government. However, in 2000, Beijing set out the conditions under which the Chung Hwa Travel Service could operate in Hong Kong, although the Mainland Affairs Council refused to detail them.

In 2004, the newly appointed managing director of the Service faced a five-month delay before receiving approval to enter Hong Kong and assume his post. Similarly, other Taiwan government officials faced difficulties obtaining visas to visit Hong Kong.

In 2009, the Service opened a visa office at Hong Kong International Airport, allowing mainland visitors to Taiwan to collect their visas at the airport instead of travelling to the office in Admiralty.

On 20 July 2011, in a ceremony presided over by Mainland Affairs Council Chairwoman Lai Shin-yuan, it was renamed the Taipei Economic and Cultural Office. This brought it into line with most other representative offices worldwide, which already had "Taipei" in their titles. The renaming was considered a milestone in the improved cross-strait relations between Taipei and Beijing.

On 20 June 2021, Taiwan recalled its staff working at the office after the Government of Hong Kong demanded that they sign a document supporting the 1992 Consensus. Only local staff remained to maintain operations.

On 20 December 2021, the entire office completed relocation from Lippo Centre in Admiralty to Central Plaza in Wan Chai.

== Transportation ==
The office is accessible within walking distance north of Wan Chai Station of the Hong Kong MTR.

== See also ==
- Hong Kong–Taiwan Economic and Cultural Co-operation and Promotion Council
- Taipei Economic and Cultural Office, Macau
- Hong Kong Economic, Trade and Cultural Office
- List of diplomatic missions of Taiwan
- Consular missions in Hong Kong
- Cross-Strait relations
- Foreign relations of Taiwan
