= Lai Shin-yuan =

Taiwanese social scientist

- 賴幸媛
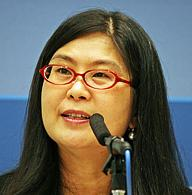

Taiwanese Representative to the World Trade Organization
- In office 28 September 2012 – July 2016
- Preceded by: Lin Yi-fu
- Succeeded by: Cyrus Chu

Minister of Mainland Affairs Council
- In office 20 May 2008 – 28 September 2012
- Preceded by: Chen Ming-tong
- Succeeded by: Wang Yu-chi

Member of the Legislative Yuan
- In office 1 February 2005 – 31 January 2008
- Constituency: National At-Large

Personal details
- Born: 9 November 1956 (age 69) Taichung, Taiwan
- Party: Independent (since 2008); Taiwan Solidarity Union (2004–2008)
- Education: Shih Hsin University (BA); London School of Economics (MSc); University of Sussex (MPhil, PhD)

Lai Shin-yuan (Chinese: 賴幸媛; pinyin: Lài Xìngyuán, born 9 November 1956) is a Taiwanese social scientist who served as minister of the Mainland Affairs Council from 2008 to 2012.

== Early life and education ==
Lai was born in Taichung, Taiwan, on 9 November 1956. After graduating from Shih Hsin University with a bachelor's degree, Lai completed advanced studies in England. She earned a Master of Science (M.Sc.) in international relations in 1983 from the London School of Economics (LSE), where she was the roommate of future Taiwanese president Tsai Ing-wen.

After graduating from LSE, Lai earned a Master of Philosophy (M.Phil.) in development studies from the University of Sussex in 1985 and also earned her Ph.D. in political sociology from the university in 1993. Her doctoral dissertation was titled, "The Politics of State-Labour Relations in Taiwan, 1949-1989, from Passivity to Unrest," and was completed under Sussex's Institute of Development Studies.

== Academic career ==
She previously taught at Shih Hsin University (1997–98) and Tamkang University (1997–2008) as an adjunct professor.

== Political career ==
Lai served as a senior adviser on the National Security Council in the Chen Shui-bian Administration from 2000 to 2004. From 2005 to 2008, Lai was a member of the Legislative Yuan, representing the Taiwan Solidarity Union.

== Mainland Affairs Council ==
Lai was selected to head the Mainland Affairs Council by President Ma Ying-jeou. She took office on 20 May 2008, with the Liu Chao-shiuan cabinet. During her term, Lai oversaw the normalization of relations between Taiwan and the special administrative regions of the PRC which are Hong Kong and Macau. Reciprocal offices were established in the three areas.

=== Taipei Economic and Cultural Office in Macau ===
On 19 July 2011, Lai officially unveiled the renaming of ROC representative office in Macau from Taipei Economic and Cultural Center in Macau to Taipei Economic and Cultural Office in Macau, bringing it in line with the rest of ROC representative offices around the world. The office renaming would give the ROC government better opportunities to promote Taiwan in Macau. The official renaming was made on 4 July 2011.

=== Taipei Economic and Cultural Office in Hong Kong ===
On 20 July 2011, Lai preceded the ceremony to rename the ROC representative office to Hong Kong from Chung Hwa Travel Service to Taipei Economic and Cultural Office in Hong Kong, bringing it inline with other ROC representative offices naming around the world. This renaming possibility was considered a milestone in the improved cross-strait relations between Taipei and Beijing. The office is located at Lippo Center building.

=== Macau Economic and Cultural Office in Taipei ===
On 13 May 2012, Lai celebrated the opening ceremony of Macau representation office in Taiwan. Lai was accompanied by Cheong U, Secretary for Social Affairs and Culture of the Macau SAR. Lai added that the office establishment resulted from the principle of goodwill and reciprocity held by both sides and it was considered a milestone in the development for bilateral relation between ROC and Macau. The office is located in Taipei 101 building.

=== Hong Kong Economic, Trade and Cultural Office in Taipei ===
On 15 May 2012, Lai oversaw the opening ceremony of the Hong Kong Economic, Trade and Cultural Office in Taipei. The office is located at President International Tower (統一國際大樓) building in Xinyi District. She added that bilateral relations between Taiwan and Hong Kong are close and hoped that the reciprocal office establishment between the two sides can serve as platform for interaction what will expand the promotion of interaction and cooperation. Also present during the opening ceremony was John Tsang, Financial Secretary of the Hong Kong SAR. He said during his opening note that Taiwan and Hong Kong have made substantial progress in the area of economic exchanges, cultural exchanges, financial supervision cooperation, bilateral transportation arrangement and cargo transshipment.
