= Sun Yat Sen Memorial Park =

Park in Sai Ying Pun, Hong Kong

Sun Yat-sen Memorial Park
- 中山紀念公園
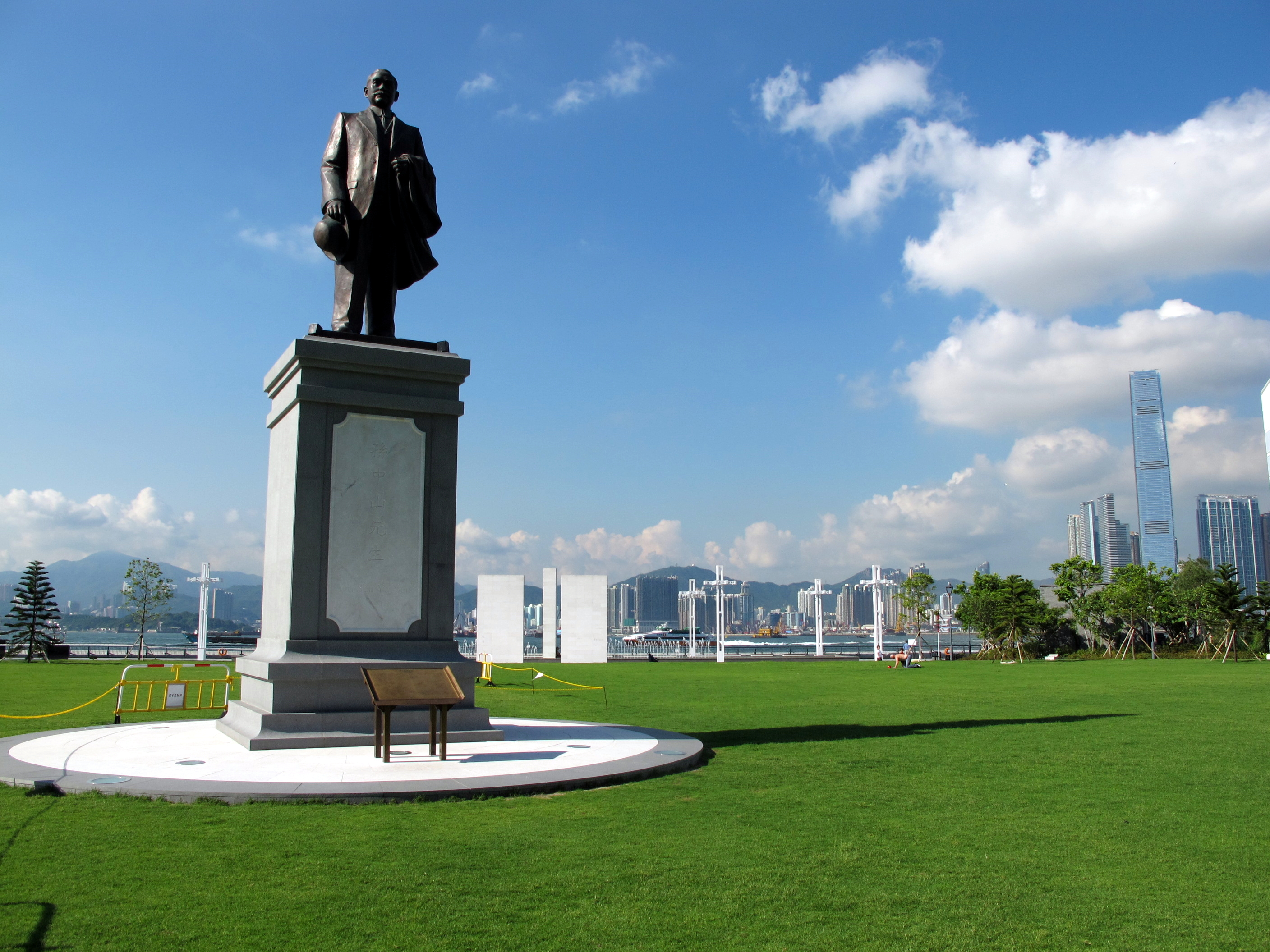
- Statue of Sun Yat-sen by Chu Tat-shing
- Interactive map of Sun Yat-sen Memorial Park
- Location: Sai Ying Pun, Hong Kong
- Coordinates: 22.29°N 114.145°E
- Area: 4.1 hectares (10 acres)
- Opened: 1991; 35 years ago
- Operator: Leisure and Cultural Services Department
- Public transit: Tram stop (160 m); Sai Ying Pun station (300 m)

Chinese name
- Traditional Chinese: 中山紀念公園
Transcriptions
Yue: Cantonese
- Yale Romanization: Jūng sāan géi nihm gūng yùhn
- Jyutping: Zung^{1} saan^{1} gei^{2} nim^{6} gung^{1} jyun^{4*2}

Western Park
- Traditional Chinese: 西區公園
Transcriptions
Yue: Cantonese
- Yale Romanization: Sāi kēui gūng yùhn
- Jyutping: Sai1 koei1 gung1 jyun4

Sun Yat-sen Memorial Park is a waterfront park in the Sai Ying Pun area of Hong Kong Island, facing Victoria Harbour. The park is named after Sun Yat-sen, and is the only one in Hong Kong named for a Chinese historic figure.

== History ==
Residents of Western had long lamented the limited recreation and leisure options in the district. Two recreation projects on the Western reclamation near Sai Ying Pun were approved in the Urban Council Capital Works Programme 1986/87–1990/91: an indoor games hall (now the Sun Yat Sen Memorial Park Sports Centre) and the original Western Park. Only part of the site was originally released to the Urban Council since most of the land was required for the construction of the Western Harbour Crossing in the 1990s. Western Park, comprising two hectares, opened in 1991.

Construction of the Western Park Sports Centre commenced in May 1992, and the facility opened on 22 May 1995. It was renamed Sun Yat Sen Memorial Park Sports Centre on 1 June 2011.

In 1999, the Provisional Urban Council approved the redevelopment of the park into a memorial park for Sun Yat-sen. This opened in 2003, but only as a temporary park and still only occupying part of the waterfront reclamation. The rest of the waterfront lands lay idle and fenced off, under the management of the Lands Department, following completion of the Western Harbour Crossing. The park was criticised for failing to live up to its name, containing little more than a plaque quoting Dr. Sun. Expansion of the park was planned, but delayed due to budgetary constraints.

The expansion and redevelopment of the park was among 25 priority projects identified in the 2005 policy address. The park closed on 28 March 2008 for reconstruction. Phase one of the reconstructed park opened to the public on 26 June 2010.

The Sun Yat Sen Memorial Park Swimming Pool, which offers a 50-metre pool and a smaller teaching pool, opened on 30 November 2011.

== Features ==
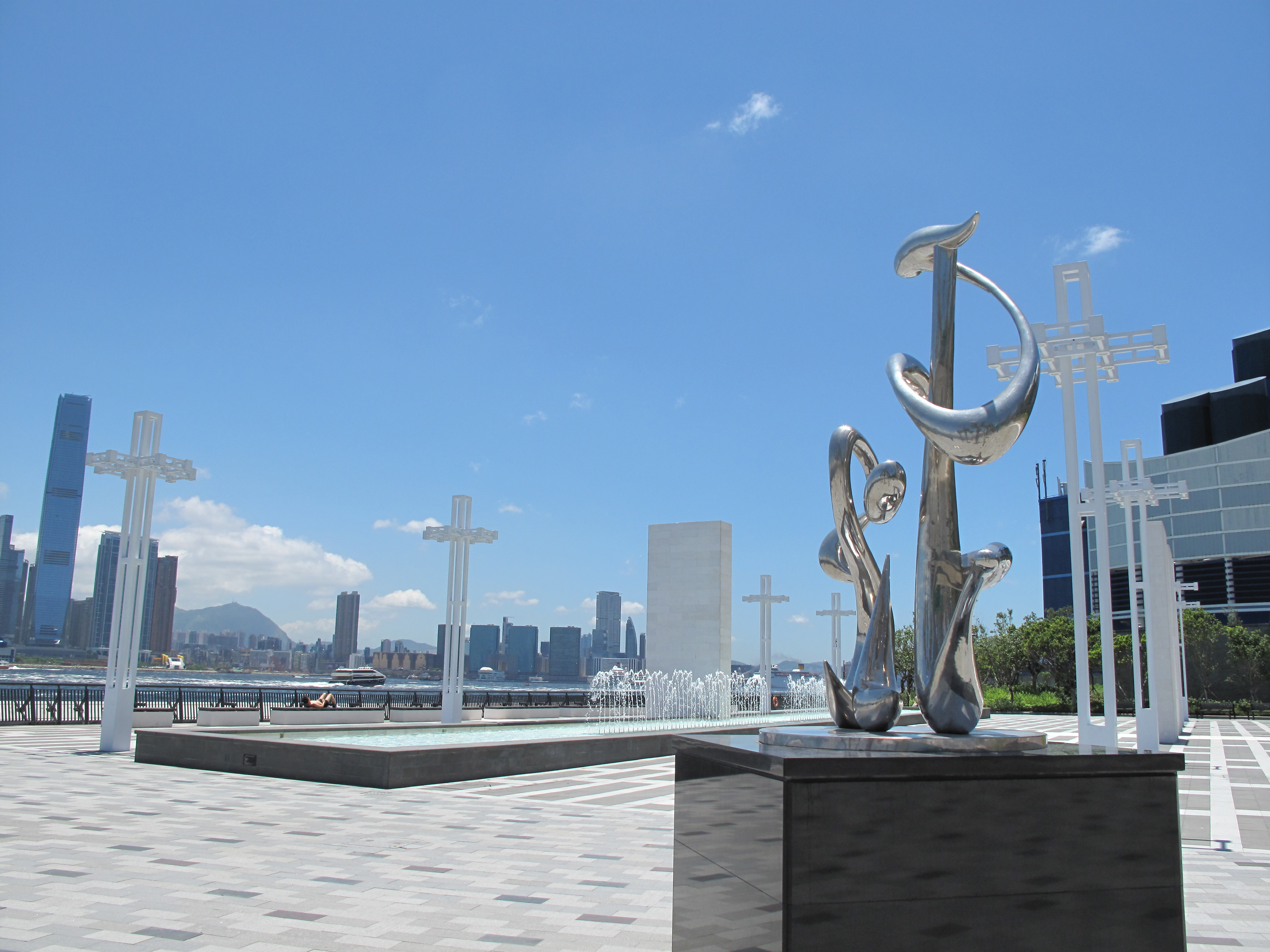
Waterfront fountain and sculptures

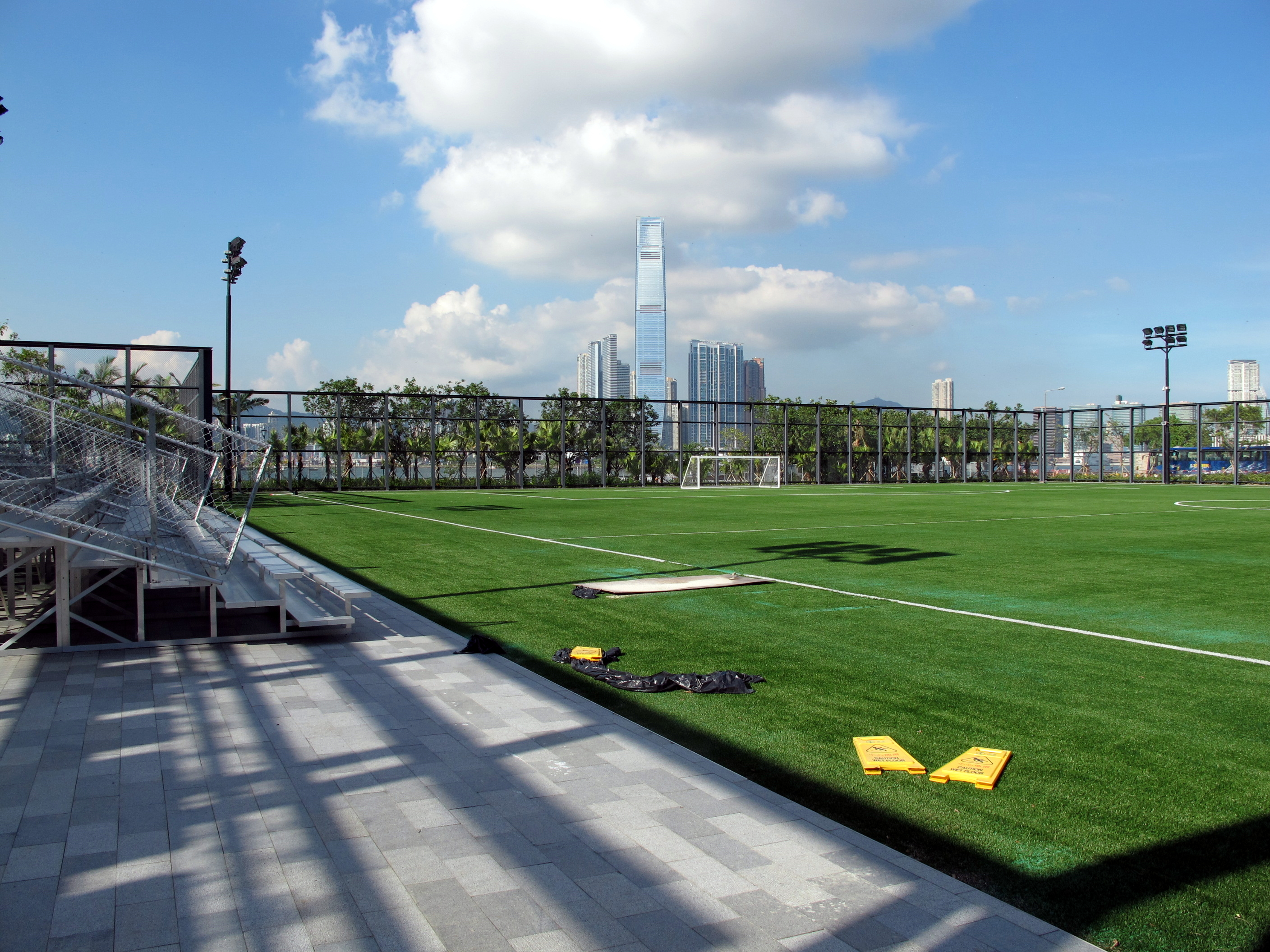
Football pitch

- Basketball courts (2)
- Children's playground
- Fitness stations
- Football pitch (7-a-side)
- Jogging track
- Memorial lawn
- Reflecting pool
- Sun Yat Sen Memorial Park Sports Centre
  - Children's play room
  - Dance room
  - Fitness room
  - Gymnasium
  - Squash/table tennis rooms
- Sun Yat Sen Memorial Park Swimming Pool
  - Competition pool (50 metres)
  - Teaching pool
  - Spectator stand
  - Sunbathing area
- Toilets
- Waterfront promenade

== See also ==
- List of urban public parks and gardens in Hong Kong
- Dr Sun Yat-sen Historical Trail
- Dr Sun Yat-sen Museum
- Red House (Hong Kong)
- Zhongshan Park
