= Hong Kong–Taiwan Economic and Cultural Co-operation and Promotion Council =

Coordinates: 22°16′51″N 114°09′54″E

- 港台經濟文化合作協進會
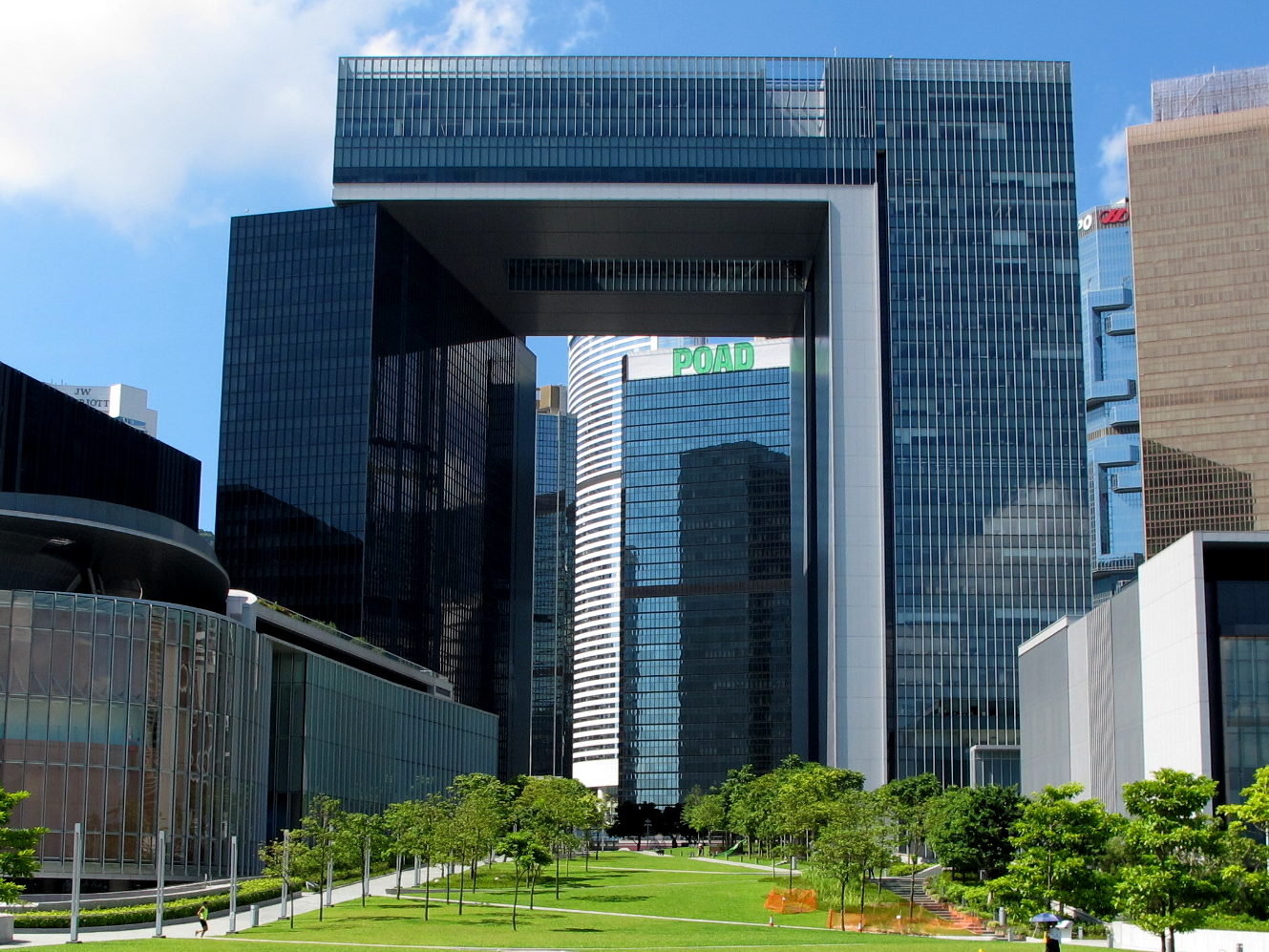

Agency overview
- Formed: 1 April 2010; 16 years ago
- Jurisdiction: Hong Kong
- Headquarters: Admiralty, Hong Kong
- Minister responsible: Charles Lee, Chairperson
- Website: www.eccpc.org.hk

Hong Kong–Taiwan Economic and Cultural Co-operation and Promotion Council
- Traditional Chinese: 港台經濟文化合作協進會
- Simplified Chinese: 港台经济文化合作协进会
Transcriptions
Standard Mandarin
- Hanyu Pinyin: Gǎng Tái Jīngjì Wénhuà Hézuò Xié Jìn Huì
Yue: Cantonese
- Yale Romanization: Góng tòih gīng jai màhn fa hahp jok hip jeun wuih
- Jyutping: Gong2 toi4 ging1 zai3 man4 fa3 hap6 zok3 hip3 zoen3 wui6

The Hong Kong–Taiwan Economic and Cultural Co-operation and Promotion Council (ECCPC) represents the Government of Hong Kong in talks with Taiwan, through its counterpart, the Taiwan–Hong Kong Economic and Cultural Co-operation Council (ECCC).

The ECCPC was set up on 1 April 2010 in a symbiotic relationship with the Taiwanese ECCC, similar to that between bodies representing Taiwan and mainland China in cross-strait talks, under a slightly hands-off approach that is often known as the "white glove" policy. The two councils, both with participation by high-ranking ministers, are incorporated as legal entities but will be authorised by the two governments to sign pacts.

The two bodies were established against a background of strengthened Hong Kong-Taiwan links and trade, which match improved China-Taiwan relations. With the establishment in 2009 of direct flights between Taiwan and the mainland, Hong Kong's role as a transit point was eliminated.

The ECCPC has only one major committee, the Business Co-operation Committee, reflecting the Hong Kong government's focus on business and economic aspects of the relationship, such as seeking mutual avoidance of double taxation and collaboration between the two financial markets. This contrasts with the broader agenda of the Taiwanese side, which is looking for progress on matters such as infectious disease control, relaxation of visa requirements for travellers and cultural exchanges. The committee chair, for a term of two years, is David Lie Tai-chong, also a vice-chairman of the ECCPC itself and a Hong Kong delegate to the Chinese People's Political Consultative Conference.

ECCPC is located at the Central Government Offices in Admiralty.

== History ==
In August 2022, after Nancy Pelosi visited Taiwan, John Lee criticized the visit and said "The Hong Kong government would fully support and facilitate all necessary measures by Beijing to safeguard national sovereignty and territorial integrity." David Lie, head of the ECCPC, said that the development would have little impact on Hong Kong, and said interactions between the ECCPC and ECCC had been limited since 2019, when Hong Kong pushed for the 2019 Hong Kong extradition bill.

== Transportation ==
The council is accessible within walking distance North from Admiralty station of Hong Kong MTR.

== See also ==
- Taiwan–Hong Kong Economic and Cultural Co-operation Council
- Political status of Taiwan
- Economic Cooperation Framework Agreement (between Taiwan and China)
- List of diplomatic missions of Taiwan
- Consular missions in Hong Kong
