= Consular missions in Hong Kong =

List of diplomatic missions in Hong Kong

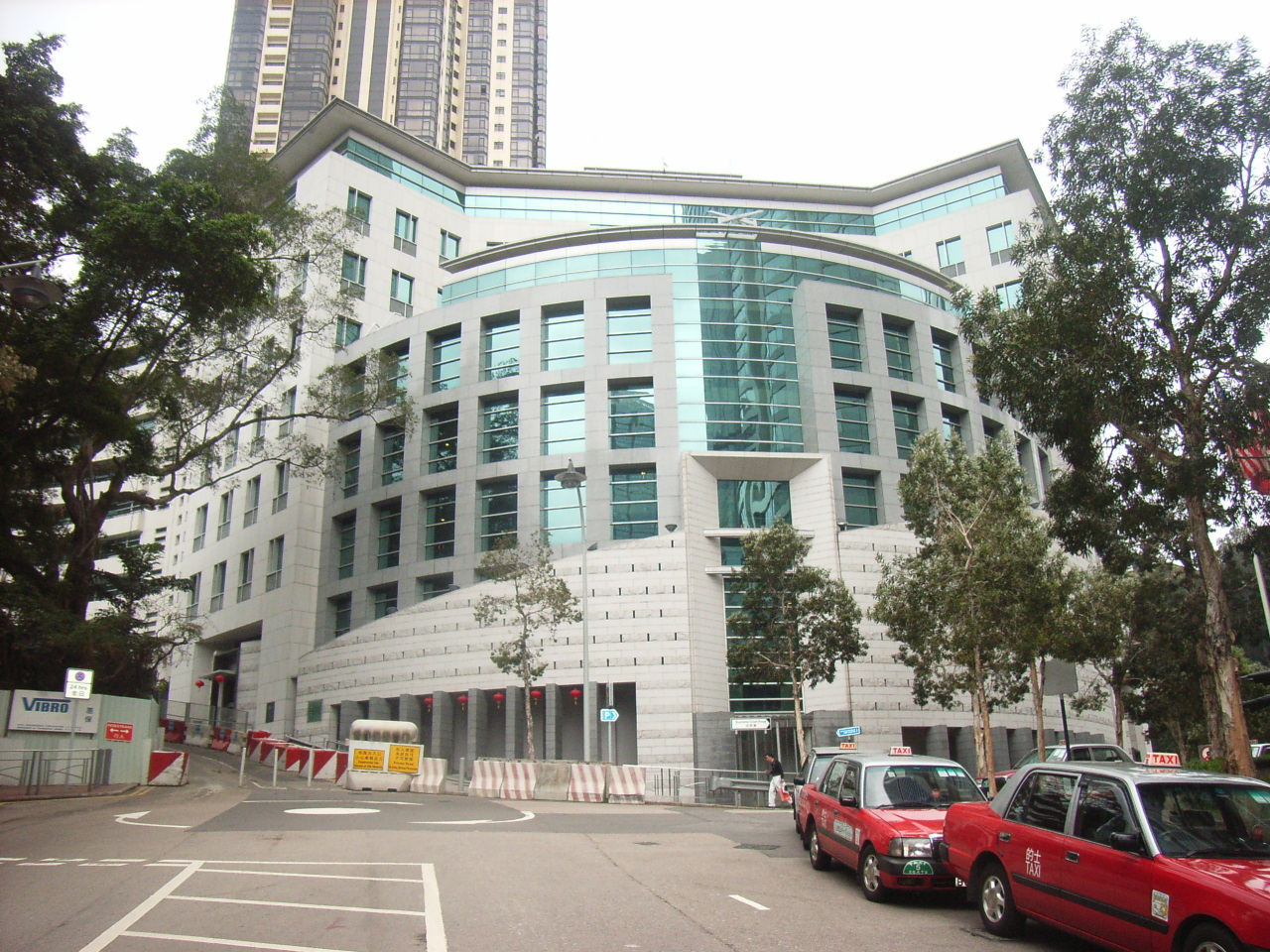
British Consulate-General, Hong Kong

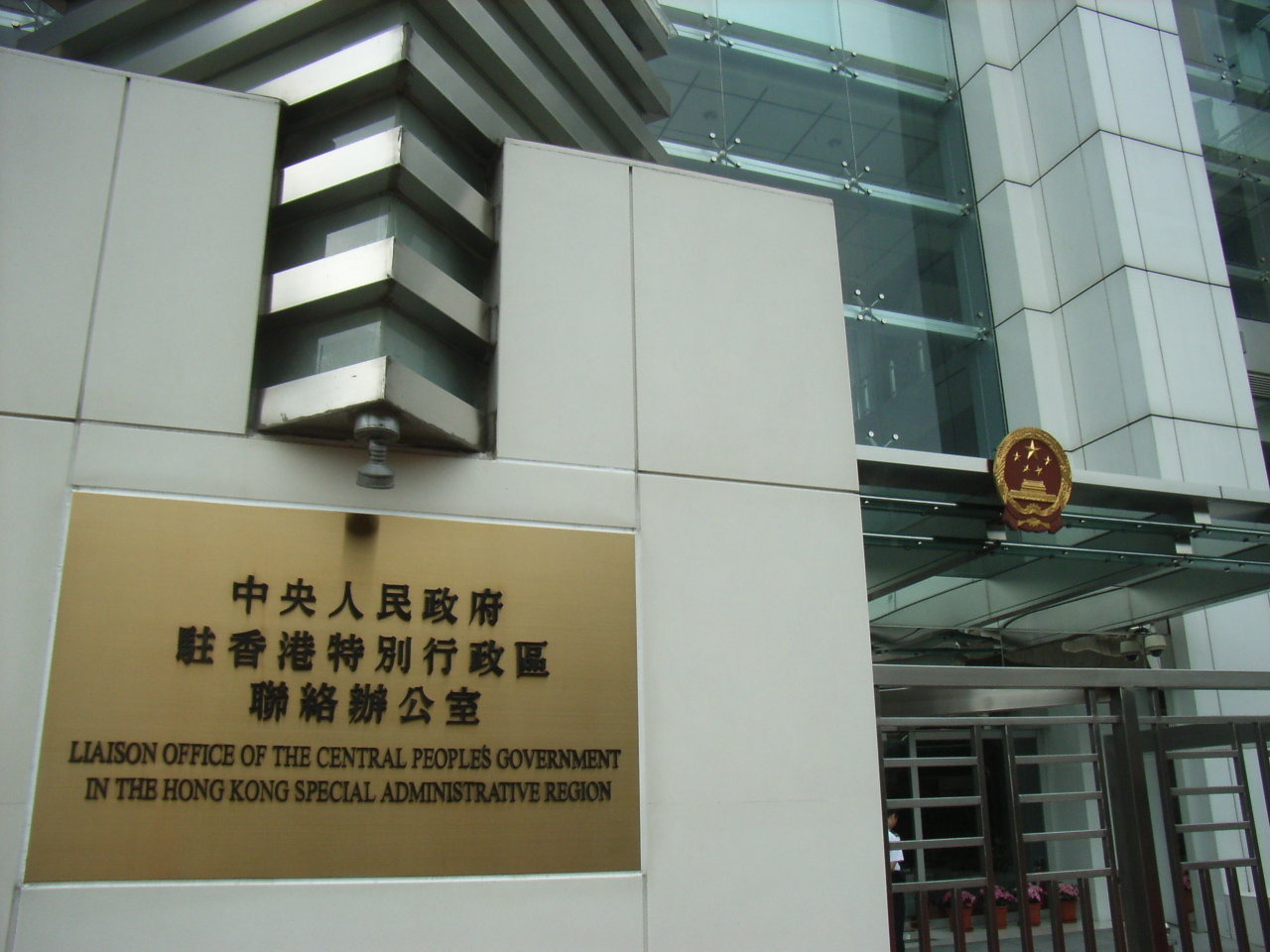
Liaison Office of the Central People's Government in the Hong Kong SAR

As of May 2024, there are 70 diplomatic missions in Hong Kong, of which 62 are consulates-general and 8 are officially recognised bodies in Hong Kong. As Hong Kong has the status of a Special Administrative Region of the People's Republic of China, some consuls-general in Hong Kong report directly to their respective foreign ministries, rather than to their Embassies in Beijing.

Most of the consulates-general are located in the areas of Central, Admiralty, Wan Chai, Wan Chai North, Causeway Bay and Sheung Wan on Hong Kong Island and a handful in Kowloon. A few are also accredited to Macau.

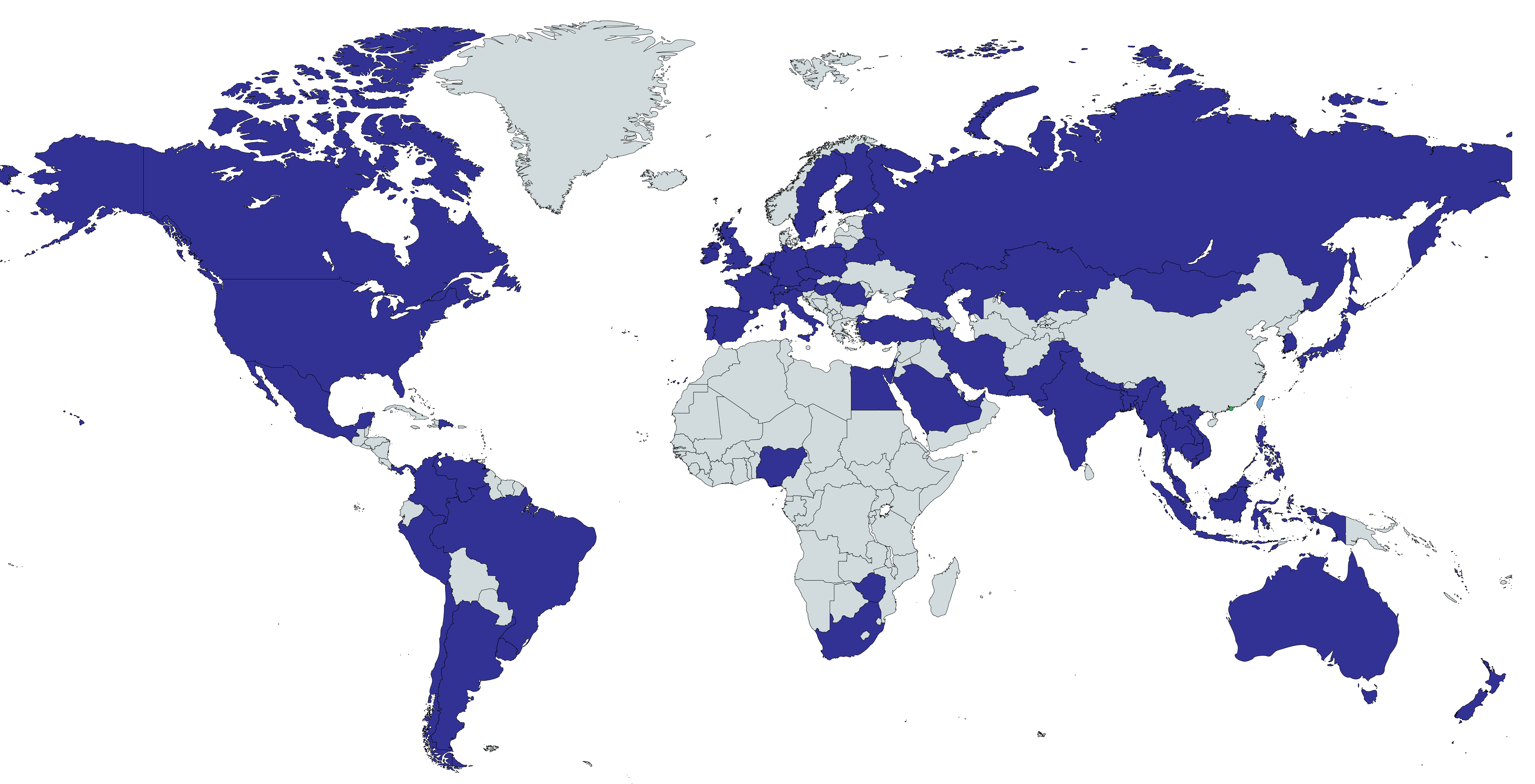
Map of countries that maintain consular missions in Hong Kong

== Greater China representation ==
The central government of the People's Republic of China in Hong Kong is represented through the Hong Kong Liaison Office.

Taiwan is represented through the Taipei Economic and Cultural Office in Hong Kong.

== Consulates General ==
Countries with no consulate-general in Hong Kong, are most likely to have an embassy in Beijing, making it the closest diplomatic mission for residents in Hong Kong.

A few consuls-general in Hong Kong have the rank of Ambassador, including Brazil, Japan, Philippines and the United States, while other consuls-general have served elsewhere as Ambassadors or High Commissioners before serving in Hong Kong, for example Australia, Germany and Israel.

Various consulates-general are accredited to both Hong Kong and Macau. The Philippines operates consulates in both territories, and Portugal serves Hong Kong through its Macau consulate. Several consulates serving both Hong Kong and Macau indicate both territories in their official names, while others do not. In 2018 the Ministry of Foreign Affairs of China requested that consulates indicate only one of the territories in their official names even if they serve both territories; it did not send this request to the European Union Office to Hong Kong and Macau.

A

- Argentina ^{†}
- Australia ^{x}^{†} (Consulate General of Australia)
- Austria ^{†}

B

- Bangladesh ^{†}
- Belarus ^{†}
- Belgium ^{†}
- Brazil ^{†}
- Brunei

C

- Cambodia ^{†}
- Canada ^{x}^{†}
- Chile ^{†}
- Colombia ^{†}
- Czech Republic

D

- Dominican Republic ^{†}

E

- Egypt ^{†}

F

- Finland ^{†}
- France ^{†}

G

- Germany ^{†}

H

- Hungary ^{†}

I

- India ^{†}
- Indonesia ^{†}
- Iran ^{†}
- Ireland ^{†}
- Israel ^{x}^{†}
- Italy ^{†}

J

- Japan ^{†}

K

- Kazakhstan ^{†}
- South Korea ^{x}^{†} (Consulate General of Korea)
- Kuwait

L

- Laos ^{†}

M

- Malaysia ^{†}
- Mexico ^{†}
- Mongolia ^{‡}
- Myanmar ^{†}

N

- Nepal (Consulate General of Nepal)
- Netherlands ^{†}
- New Zealand ^{†}
- Nigeria ^{†}

P

- Pakistan ^{†}
- Panama
- Peru ^{†}
- Philippines
- Poland ^{†}

Q

- Qatar

R

- Romania ^{†}
- Russia ^{†}

S

- Saudi Arabia ^{†}
- Singapore ^{†}
- South Africa ^{†}
- Spain ^{†}
- Sweden ^{†} (Consulate General of Sweden)
- Switzerland ^{†}

T

- Thailand ^{†}
- Turkey ^{†}

U

- United Arab Emirates
- United Kingdom ^{x}^{†} (British Consulate General)
- United States ^{x}^{†} (United States Consulate General)
- Uruguay

V

- Vanuatu
- Venezuela ^{†}
- Vietnam ^{†}

Z

- Zimbabwe ^{†}

Legend

- † Also accredited to Macau.
- ‡ Consulates-general resident in Macau and accredited to Hong Kong.
- x These consulate-general report directly to their respective foreign ministries, rather than to their Embassies in Beijing.

=== Missions of other recognised bodies ===
- Asian–African Legal Consultative Organization - AALCO Hong Kong Regional Arbitration Centre
- Bank for International Settlements – Representative Office for Asia and the Pacific
- European Union – Office of the European Commission (Also accredited to Macau)
- Hague Conference on Private International Law – Asia Pacific Regional Office
- The International Bank for Reconstruction and Development and The International Finance Corporation – IFC Regional Office for East Asia and Pacific and the World Bank Private Sector Development Office for East Asia and Pacific
- International Monetary Fund – Hong Kong SAR Sub-Office
- International Organization for Mediation - Headquarters
- United Nations High Commissioner for Refugees – Sub-Office

== History ==
When Hong Kong was under British rule, the Governor represented the British government, as well as the British monarch as head of state. Matters relating to British nationality were handled by the Hong Kong Immigration Department.

However, the United Kingdom's commercial interests were represented by the British Trade Commission. The last Senior Trade Commissioner, Francis Cornish, became the first British Consul-General following the transfer of sovereignty to China, on July 1, 1997.

During the negotiations between Britain and China on the future of Hong Kong, the British proposed the establishment of a "British Commissioner" following the transfer of sovereignty to China, which the Chinese rejected as an attempt to make the future Hong Kong Special Administrative Region into a member or associated member of the Commonwealth.

As Hong Kong was a Colony (later Dependent Territory) of a Commonwealth country, some Commonwealth countries were represented by Commissions before the handover including Australia, Bangladesh, Canada, New Zealand, India, Malaysia, Nigeria and Singapore.

After the transfer of sovereignty, they were renamed Consulates-General. Similarly, the title of the head of mission was also changed, from Commissioner to Consul-General. However, the Australian Commission had been renamed the Consulate-General in 1986.

Although South Africa rejoined the Commonwealth in 1994, and its Embassies in Commonwealth countries were renamed High Commissions, the name of the South African Consulate General in Hong Kong remained unchanged. Similarly, while Pakistan had rejoined the Commonwealth in 1989, the name of the Pakistan Consulate General in Hong Kong also remained unchanged.

At the time of the transfer of sovereignty on 1 July 1997, South Africa did not have diplomatic relations with the People's Republic of China, as it had not yet transferred recognition from Taiwan. However, it was able to maintain its Consulate-General for an interim six-month period, until relations with Beijing were established on 1 January 1998.

Other countries which had chosen to maintain diplomatic relations with Taipei closed their consulates in Hong Kong prior to the transfer of sovereignty, such as Paraguay, which closed its consulate on May 11, 1997. Earlier, it had considered relocating to Macau, which was then still under Portuguese administration. The Central African Republic, Costa Rica, and the Dominican Republic also closed their consulates, while Liberia, with which China had broken off diplomatic relations in September 1997, was forced to close its consulate a month later. However, it later restored diplomatic relations with Beijing in 2003.

As a result of the transfer of sovereignty, North Korea, which had not been allowed to establish a trade mission in Hong Kong during British rule, was able to open a Consulate-General in February 2000. Similarly, Iran was also able to re-establish its Consulate-General, giving rise to concerns that the country could gain access to arms smuggled through Hong Kong, a free port. This had been closed by the British Government in 1989 following the Rushdie Affair.

Bhutan, which did not have diplomatic relations with either Beijing or Taipei at the time of the transfer of sovereignty, was able to maintain an honorary consulate in Hong Kong, accredited to Macau.

=== Former missions ===
- Angola (Consulate-General until 2018)
- Bahamas (Honorary Consulate until 2003)
- Benin (Honorary Consulate until 2007)
- Cape Verde (Consulate-General until 2000)
- Central African Republic (Honorary Consulate until 2006)
- Congo-Kinshasa (Honorary Consulate until 2009)
- Denmark (Consulate-General until 2012)
- Gabon (Honorary Consulate until 2016)
- Ghana (Honorary Consulate until 2013)
- Greece (Consulate-General until 2003, and Honorary Consulate until 2004)
- Kiribati (Honorary Consulate until 2003)
- North Korea (Consulate-General until 2023)
- Portugal (Consulate-General until 2003)
- South Vietnam (Consulate-General until 1975)
- Khmer Republic (Consulate-General until 1975)
- Togo (Honorary Consulate until 2014)
- Ukraine (Honorary Consulate until 2007)

The following countries, which recognise Taiwan as the Republic of China, previously had consulates in Hong Kong before 1997.

- Belize
- Guatemala
- Paraguay
- Saint Lucia
- Tuvalu

Paraguay is currently accredited to Hong Kong and Macau through its embassy in Tokyo, Japan.

The following countries, which no longer have diplomatic relations with Taiwan, previously had consulates in Hong Kong under British rule:

- Central African Republic
- Costa Rica
- Dominica
- El Salvador
- Gambia
- Honduras
- Liberia
- Nauru
- Nicaragua

=== Countries without missions ===
The following countries, which have diplomatic relations with the People's Republic of China, do not presently have representation in Hong Kong, but have proposed establishing consulates:

- Antigua and Barbuda
- Armenia
- East Timor
- Kiribati
- Solomon Islands

The following countries, which have diplomatic relations with Taiwan, have never had consulates in Hong Kong:

- Eswatini
- Haiti
- Holy See
- Marshall Islands
- Palau
- Saint Kitts and Nevis
- Saint Vincent and the Grenadines

== See also ==
- Hong Kong Economic and Trade Office
- Consular missions in Macau
- The Office of the Commissioner of the Ministry of Foreign Affairs of the People's Republic of China in the Hong Kong Special Administrative Region
