= Liang Wen-chieh =

Taiwanese politician (born 1971)

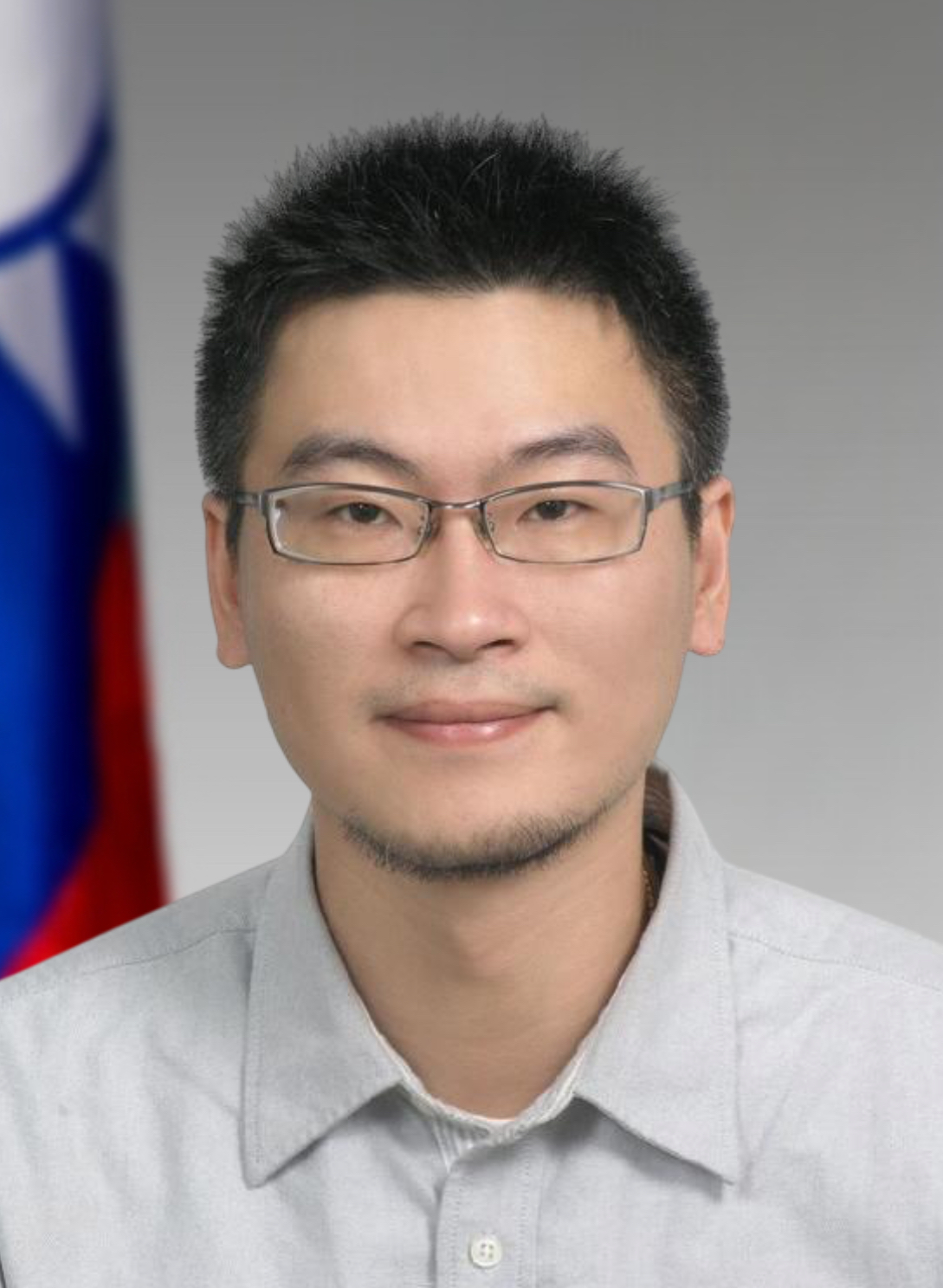
- Official portrait, 2023

Deputy Minister of Mainland Affairs
- Incumbent
- Assumed office 31 January 2023
- Minister: Chiu Tai-san; Chiu Chui-cheng
- Preceded by: Chiu Chui-cheng

Spokesperson of the Mainland Affairs Council
- Incumbent
- Assumed office 31 January 2023
- Minister: Chiu Tai-san; Chiu Chui-cheng
- Preceded by: Chiu Chui-cheng

Vice Chairman of the Straits Exchange Foundation
- Incumbent
- Assumed office 6 September 2024 Serving with Luo Wen-jia and Rock Hsu
- Chairman: Rock Hsu (acting); Frank Wu (journalist)

Taipei City Councillor
- In office 25 December 2010 – 25 December 2022
- Constituency: 4th District (Zhongshan, Datong)

Personal details
- Born: November 26, 1971 (age 54) Taipei County, Taiwan
- Spouse: Michelle Lin (m. 2007)
- Education: National Taiwan University (BA, MA)

Liang Wen-chieh (Chinese: 梁文傑; born November 26, 1971) is a Taiwanese DPP politician who is currently serving as the Mainland Affairs Council Deputy Minister and Vice Chairman of the Straits Exchange Foundation.

== Early life and education ==
Liang Wen-chieh was born in 1971 in Yonghe District, Taipei County (now part of New Taipei City), Taiwan. His parents were originally from the Dachen Islands who were evacuated to Taiwan in 1955 following the defeat of Nationalists by the Communists at the Battle of Dachen Archipelago.

From 1990 to 1997, Liang studied at National Taiwan University, where he graduated with a bachelors and masters degree in political science. During his studies, Liang was one of the leading figures of the Wild Lily student movement.

== Political career ==
As a party official, from 1999 to 2000, Liang was deputy Director of the DPP's Department of Chinese Affairs. From 2002 to 2005, he was the party's Chief Deputy Executive Director for its Policy Research and Coordinating Committee and also an advisor from 2004 to 2005 to the Mainland Affairs Council. From 2020 to 2022, Liang served as a member of the party's Central Executive Committee.

As an elected official, Liang served from 2010 to 2022 for four terms on the Taipei City Council.

=== Electoral record ===
Year	Election term	Electoral district	Party	Votes	Vote percentage	Elected mark	Remarks
2010	The 11th Taipei City Council Election	Taipei City Fourth Electoral District	Democratic Progressive Party	21,111	11.23%		
2014	The 12th Taipei City Council Election	Taipei City Fourth Electoral District	Democratic Progressive Party	26,155	13.23%		
2018	The 13th Taipei City Council Election	Taipei City Fourth Electoral District	Democratic Progressive Party	17,827	9.64%		
2022	The 14th Taipei City Council Election	Taipei City Fourth Electoral District	Democratic Progressive Party	12,919	7.20%		

== Personal life ==
He is the husband of DPP Legislator Lin Chuyin. From 2008 to 2009, Liang served as a lecturer in Constitutional Theory in the Department of Law at Aletheia University.
