= Lin Cheng-yi =

Lin Cheng-yi or Lin Zhengyi may refer to:

- Lin Cheng-yi (footballer) (born 1987), Taiwanese footballer
- Lin Cheng-yi (legislator) (born 1942), Taiwanese politician, member of the Legislative Yuan from 2002 to 2005
- Lin Cheng-yi (minister), Taiwanese politician, acting minister of the Mainland Affairs Council in 2018
- Justin Yifu Lin (born 1952 as Lin Cheng-yi), Taiwanese-born Chinese economist

== See also ==
- Lin Chen-yi (born 1945), Taiwanese admiral, Chief of the General Staff from 2009 to 2013
- Lin Ching-yi (born 1974), Taiwanese politician, member of the Legislative Yuan from 2016 to 2020
