= David Lee (Taiwanese politician) =

Taiwanese politician and diplomat

Lee Ta-wei
- 李大維
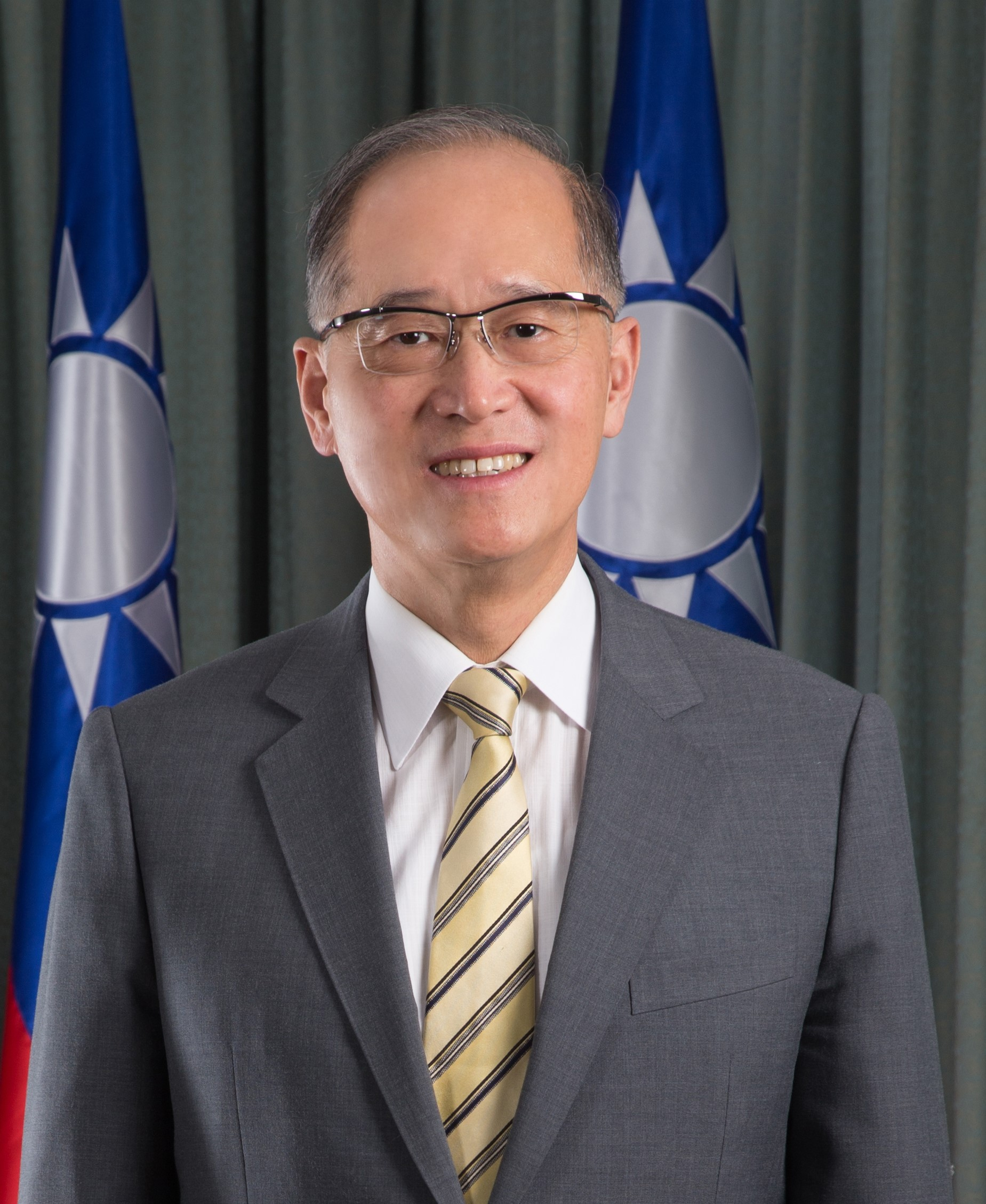
- Official portrait, 2016

8th Chairperson of the Straits Exchange Foundation
- In office 31 January 2023 – 20 May 2024
- Deputy: Rock Hsu; Chiu Chui-cheng
- Preceded by: Rock Hsu (acting)
- Succeeded by: Cheng Wen-tsan
- In office 20 May 2020 – 3 August 2020
- Deputy: Chiu Chui-cheng; Rock Hsu
- Preceded by: Katharine Chang
- Succeeded by: Rock Hsu (acting)

37th Secretary-General to the President
- In office 3 August 2020 – 31 January 2023
- President: Tsai Ing-wen
- Preceded by: Liu Chien-sin (acting)
- Succeeded by: Lin Chia-lung

17th Secretary-General of the National Security Council
- In office 26 February 2018 – 19 May 2020
- Preceded by: Yen Teh-fa
- Succeeded by: Wellington Koo

26th Minister of Foreign Affairs
- In office 20 May 2016 – 26 February 2018
- Prime Minister: Lin Chuan; William Lai
- Deputy: See list: Hou Ching-shan Wu Chih-chung (Deputy) Lee Chen-jan (Vice)
- Preceded by: David Lin
- Succeeded by: Joseph Wu

Taiwanese Representative to Australia
- In office 1 January 2015 – 2016
- Foreign Minister: David Lin
- Preceded by: Katharine Chang
- Succeeded by: William Lin (acting)

Director of the Coordination Council for North American Affairs
- In office 20 May 2012 – 1 January 2015
- Preceded by: Shao Yu-ming
- Succeeded by: Katharine Chang

Taiwanese Representative to Canada
- In office 10 April 2007 – 20 May 2012
- Foreign Minister: James C. F. Huang; Francisco Ou; Timothy Yang
- Succeeded by: Liu Chih-kung

9th Taiwanese Representative to the United States
- In office 25 July 2004 – 10 April 2007
- Foreign Minister: Mark Chen; James C. F. Huang
- Preceded by: Chen Chien-jen
- Succeeded by: Joseph Wu

1st Taiwanese Representative to the European Union and Belgium
- In office 21 March 2001 – 25 July 2004
- Foreign Minister: Tien Hung-mao; Eugene Chien; Mark Chen
- Preceded by: Position established
- Succeeded by: Chen Chien-jen

Deputy Minister of Foreign Affairs
- In office 5 February 1998 – 29 December 2000
- Minister: Chiang Hsiao-yen; Jason Hu; Chen Chien-jen; Tien Hung-mao

14th Minister of the Government Information Office
- In office 15 May 1997 – 5 February 1998
- Prime Minister: Lien Chan; Vincent Siew
- Preceded by: Su Chi
- Succeeded by: Chen Chien-jen

Vice Minister of the Government Information Office
- In office 1 September 1996 – 14 May 1997
- Minister: Su Chi

Personal details
- Born: 15 October 1949 (age 76) Taipei, Taiwan
- Party: Kuomintang (suspended)
- Education: National Taiwan University (BA); University of Virginia (MA, PhD)

Lee Ta-wei (Chinese: 李大維; pinyin: Lǐ Dàwéi; born 15 October 1949), also known by his English name David Lee, is a Taiwanese politician and diplomat who was the chairman of Straits Exchange Foundation in 2020 and then 2023 to 2024. He formerly served as the Minister of Foreign Affairs from May 2016 to February 2018, Secretary-General of the National Security Council of Taiwan from February 2018 to May 2020, and the Secretary-General to the President since 3 August 2020 to 31 January 2023.

== Education ==
Lee graduated from National Taiwan University with a Bachelor of Arts (B.A.) in political science in 1973, then completed graduate studies in the United States at the University of Virginia, where he earned his Master of Arts (M.A.) in foreign affairs in 1981 and his Ph.D. in foreign affairs in 1987. His doctoral dissertation was titled, "The Making of the Taiwan Relation Act: Twenty Years in Retrospect".

== Career timeline ==
- 2007–2012 representative, Taipei Economic and Cultural Office in Canada
- 2004–2007 representative, Taipei Economic and Cultural Representative Office in the United States
- 2001–2004 representative, Taipei Representative Office in Belgium, also responsible for the European Union and Luxembourg
- 1998–2001 deputy minister, Ministry of Foreign Affairs, ROC (Taiwan)
- 2000–2001 adjunct professor, National Taiwan University
- 1997–1998 director-general, Government Information Office, Executive Yuan, and Government Spokesman (Cabinet rank), ROC
- 1996 director-general, Department of North American Affairs, Ministry of Foreign Affairs, ROC
- 1993–1996 associate in Research, Fairbank Centre for East Asian Research, Harvard University
- 1993–1996 director-general, Taipei Economic and Cultural Office in Boston
- 1990–1993 deputy director-general, Department of International Information Service, Government Information Office, Executive Yuan
- 1988–1993 adjunct associate professor, National Taiwan Normal University
- 1988–1989 principal assistant to the Minister of Foreign Affairs
- 1982–1988 staff consultant, Coordination Council for North American Affairs, Office in Washington, D.C.
- 1976–1977 managing editor, Asia and the World Forum, Taipei, Taiwan

== Minister of Foreign Affairs ==
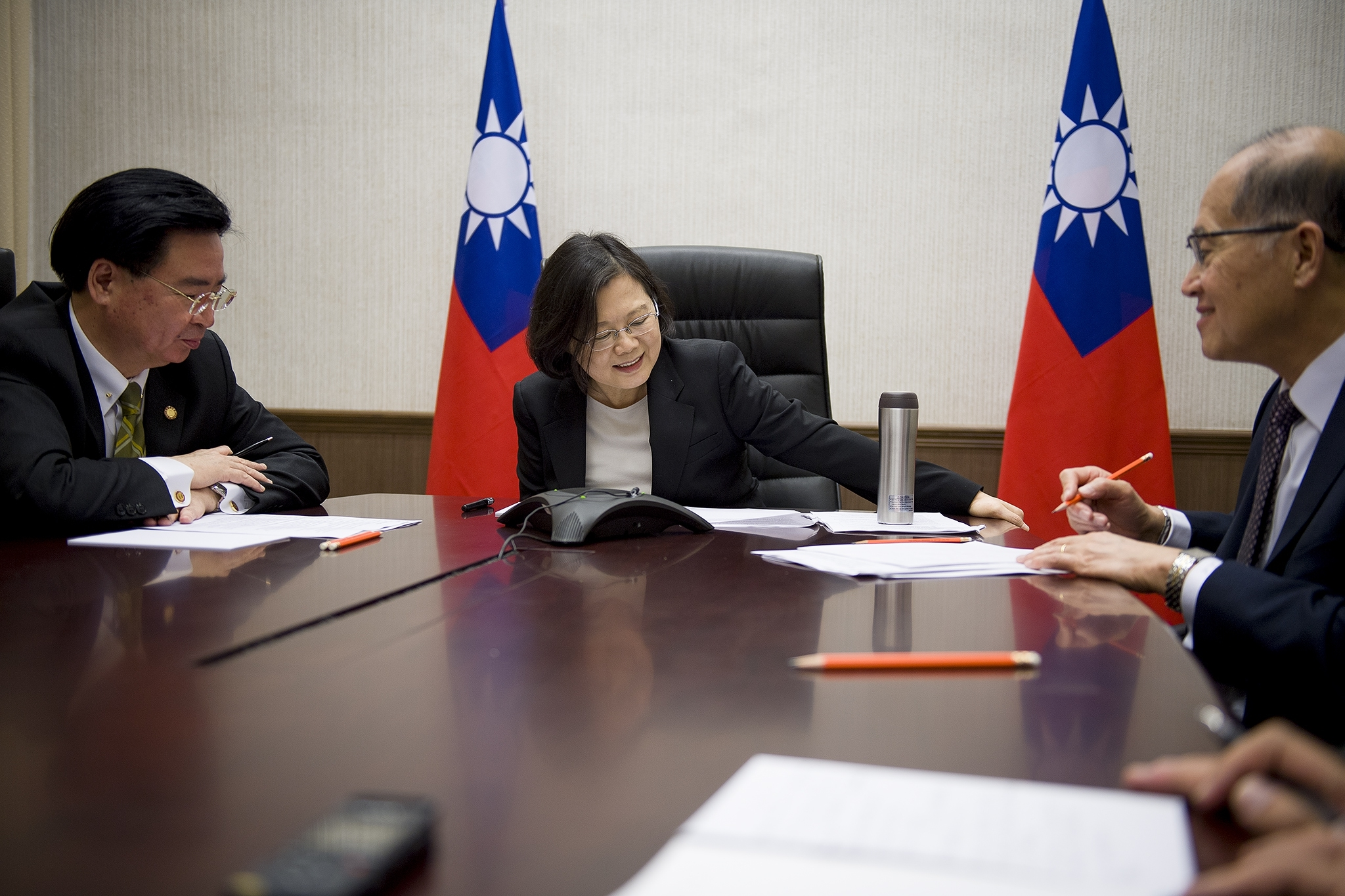
President Tsai congratulates US President-elect Donald Trump in a phone call during a meeting of the National Security Council. Secretary-General of the National Security Council Joseph Wu (left) and Minister of Foreign Affairs David Lee (right).

=== Taiwan membership at the United Nations ===
Speaking in August 2016, Lee said that Taiwan will continue to pursue meaningful participation in the United Nations (UN) agencies. However, he will not promote Taiwan to apply for UN membership.

=== ROC diplomatic allies visits ===
During his ministerial term, Lee visited Palau to attend the inauguration of President Tommy Remengesau in January 2017, Haiti to attend the inauguration of President Jovenel Moïse in February 2017 and Solomon Islands in June 2017.

== Secretary General to the President ==
=== Confidentiality breach on the Special Force soldier letter ===
On 11 March 2022, a special force soldier wrote a letter to President Tsai Ing-wen reporting the insufficient basic logistic supply which has compelled the combatants to purchase from outsider suppliers at their own expense for two years, then being disqualified as non-standard upon inspection, in contrast of the reserve trainees receiving new sets; and appealed to abolish the mandatory diary writing for examination. The classified "2022006470" paper was taken photo illegally from the presidential palace and leaked to the media with his identity exposed on 18 March; hence Minister of National Defense Chiu Kuo-cheng reacted: "I will not let him get away with it", "Fix the crying baby!"; but later clarified while being questioned by the parliament members in the Legislative Yuan, that he just disgusts the coward behavior behind his back, and the critique unfair to the preparatory staff. The incident raised the broad society concern on the standard operating procedure practice on the data security breach in the presidential office.

== Publications ==
- The Making of the Taiwan Relations Act: Twenty Years in Retropect. Oxford University Press, 2000 ISBN 0195922093
- Taiwan in a Transformed World. (co-edited with Robert L. Pfaltzgraff, Jr.) Brassey's Inc., 1995 ISBN 0028811380
- The Legislative Process of the Taiwan Relations Act. Taipei, Feng Yuen Publication, 1988

== See also ==
- List of foreign ministers in 2017

Government offices
Preceded by Chen Chien-jen	Taiwanese Representative to the United States; 2004–2007	Succeeded by Joseph Wu
Preceded by David Lin	Minister of Foreign Affairs; 2016–2018	Succeeded by Joseph Wu
Preceded by Su Jia-chyuan; Liu Chien-sin (acting)	Secretary-General to the President; 2020–2023	Succeeded by Lin Chia-lung
Incumbent
