= Wu Mei-hung =

Taiwanese politician

- 吳美紅
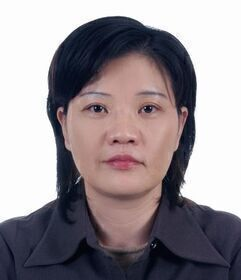
- Official portrait, 2023

Deputy Minister of Ocean Affairs Council
- Incumbent
- Assumed office 31 January 2023
- Minister: Kuan Bi-ling

Deputy Minister of Mainland Affairs Council
- In office 17 September 2020 – 30 January 2023 Serving with Chiu Chui-cheng, Lee Li-chen
- Minister: Chen Ming-tong
- Succeeded by: Liang Wen-chieh

Political Deputy Minister of Mainland Affairs Council
- In office 2 September 2013 – 2 December 2015
- Minister: Wang Yu-chi; Andrew Hsia
- Preceded by: Chang Hsien-yao

Personal details
- Education: National Taiwan University (LLB)

Wu Mei-hung (Chinese: 吳美紅; pinyin: Wú Měihóng) is a Taiwanese politician. She was the Political Deputy Minister and Spokesperson of the Mainland Affairs Council (MAC) of the Executive Yuan from 2013 to 2015.

== Education ==
Wu obtained her bachelor's degree in law from National Taiwan University.

== ROC Mainland Affairs Council Political Deputy Ministry ==
=== Possibility of Ma-Xi meeting ===
On 17 October 2013, Wu said that the possibility of meeting between Ma Ying-jeou and Xi Jinping can only be achieved with the conditions of Leader of Taiwan side must be recognized in his capacity as the President of the Republic of China and that such meeting must be supported by the Taiwanese public. The meeting must also comply with parity and dignity, no matter what the meeting model will be. It must also be held under the condition of nor harming the dignity of the Republic of China, be conductive to the welfare of the Taiwanese and improves cross-strait relations.

=== Cross-strait relations status quo ===
Speaking at a press conference on 31 October 2013, Wu said that most of Taiwanese people support to maintain the status quo on cross-strait relations after a recent survey showed that 71% of Taiwanese support independence from China. Wu said that those people who support independence cannot be simply interpreted as supporting independence. She added that based on the several public opinion polls conducted by the MAC to choose between independence or unification, 80% of the respondents always show the support of maintaining the status quo.

=== ROC flag display by singer Deserts Chang in UK ===
On 14 November 2013, commenting on the cancellation of concert in Beijing by singer Deserts Chang after a mainland Chinese audience was angry at her displaying the ROC flag in her concert in the United Kingdom earlier, Wu said that she regretted the concert cancellation, but she respected the decision made by Chang, considering performance quality and the safety of concertgoers. The MAC had communicated with Taiwan Affairs Office (TAO) over this matter. TAO response was positive by saying that younger generations should increase contact and engagement to enhance mutual understanding, feelings of familiarity and ethnic identity.

=== Mainland China human rights issues ===
On 23 January 2014, Wu called on Beijing government to rationally handle issues of social justice, judicial integrity and human rights in mainland China. The statement was made one day after a mainland Chinese activist Xu Zhiyong was tried at court for gathering crowds to disrupt public order.

=== Attracting mainland students to study in Taiwan ===
In mid May 2014, Wu said that Taiwan would improve its education and living conditions for the mainland students to attract more mainland students to come to Taiwan to study so that cross-strait communication could be boosted between young people. She added that Taiwan had eased measures to recruit them, such as recognizing mainland universities and colleges degree, increasing the number of mainland students and streamlining the registration process. She said that Taiwan hoped to increase the total number of mainland student to 5,700 later in 2014 from the current 2,850 students.

=== 2015 Ma-Xi Meeting ===
Wu was one among the six high-level government official from Taiwan during the meeting between Taiwan Leader Ma Ying-jeou and mainland China Leader Xi Jinping in Singapore on 7 November 2015.

== See also ==
- Cross-Strait relations
