= Chang Tien-chin =

Taiwanese legal scholar and lawyer

- 張天欽

Vice Chairperson and Secretary-General of Straits Exchange Foundation
- In office 12 September 2016 – 31 December 2016
- Chairperson: Tien Hung-mao
- Succeeded by: Ko Cheng-heng

Deputy Minister of Mainland Affairs Council of the Republic of China
- In office 20 May 2016 – 31 May 2018
- Minister: Katharine Chang; Lin Cheng-yi (acting); Chen Ming-tong
- Succeeded by: Lee Li-chen

Personal details
- Born: 8 March 1954 (age 72) Chiayi County, Taiwan
- Education: National Taiwan University (LLB, LLM); Tulane University (LLM, SJD)

Chang Tien-chin (Chinese: 張天欽; pinyin: Zhāng Tiānqīn; born 8 March 1954) is a Taiwanese lawyer and legal scholar. He was the deputy minister of the Mainland Affairs Council from 2016 to 2018.

== Education and legal career ==
After graduating from Taipei Municipal Chien Kuo High School, Chang studied law at National Taiwan University and graduated with a Bachelor of Laws (LL.B.) in 1976 and a Master of Laws (LL.M.) in 1978. He then completed graduate studies in the United States at Tulane University, where he earned a second LL.M. in admiralty law in 1982 and his Doctor of Juridical Science (S.J.D.) in 1984, both from the Tulane University School of Law. After obtaining his doctorate, he became a lawyer for the Democratic Progressive Party.

== Political career ==
Chang took office as deputy minister of the Mainland Affairs Council on 20 May 2016, with the Tsai Ing-wen presidential administration. In September 2016, Chang began his duties as vice chairman of the Straits Exchange Foundation. He was replaced in September.

Chang was subsequently named vice chairman of the Transitional Justice Commission in March 2018, and left his position at the Mainland Affairs Council. Chang was formally sworn into office in July 2018, a month after the Transitional Justice Commission had started meeting. In September 2018, a whistleblower made public a recording in which Chang compared the Transitional Justice Commission to the infamous Ming dynasty organization Eastern Depot which stifled dissent. In the recording, he suggested that the Tsai Ing-wen presidential administration should use dirty tricks to defeat Kuomintang mayoral candidate Hou You-yi's bid. Subsequently, Chang resigned from his position as deputy chairman of the commission On 1 October 2019, the Control Yuan voted unanimously for Chang's impeachment.
