= Katharine Chang =

Taiwanese diplomat

Chang Hsiao-yueh
- 張小月
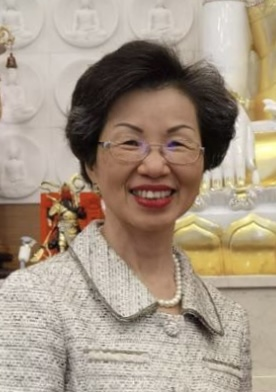

Chairwoman of the Straits Exchange Foundation
- In office 27 March 2018 – 5 June 2020
- Deputy: Ko Cheng-heng; Yao Jen-to
- Preceded by: Tien Hung-mao
- Succeeded by: David Lee

12th Minister of Mainland Affairs Council
- In office 20 May 2016 – 26 February 2018
- Deputy: Chang Tien-chin, Chiu Chui-cheng, Lin Cheng-yi
- Preceded by: Andrew Hsia
- Succeeded by: Lin Cheng-yi (acting); Chen Ming-tong

Director of the Coordination Council for North American Affairs
- In office 1 January 2016 – 20 May 2016
- Preceded by: David Lee
- Succeeded by: Tao Yi-fen

ROC Representative to Australia
- In office December 2011 – 31 December 2014
- Succeeded by: David Lee

ROC Representative to the United Kingdom
- In office December 2007 – December 2011
- Preceded by: Edgar Lin
- Succeeded by: Shen Lyu-shun

Vice Minister of Foreign Affairs of the Republic of China
- In office April 2006 – December 2007
- Minister: James C. F. Huang

ROC Representative to the Netherlands
- In office February 2003 – April 2006
- Succeeded by: Larry Wang

ROC Ambassador to Saint Kitts and Nevis
- In office December 1997 – March 2001

Personal details
- Born: 12 February 1953 (age 73)
- Education: National Chengchi University (BA); Long Island University (MA)

Chang Hsiao-yueh (Chinese: 張小月; pinyin: Zhāng Xiǎoyuè; born 12 February 1953), also known by her English name Katharine Chang, is a Taiwanese diplomat. She is the first female diplomat in Taiwan.

== Education ==
Chang graduated from National Chengchi University with a bachelor's degree in diplomacy. She then pursued graduate studies in the United States, earning a Master of Arts (M.A.) in international relations from Long Island University.

== Career ==
Chang began her diplomatic career in 1976. In January 1995, she was named leader of the Taipei Economic and Cultural Office in Seattle, and became the first woman to serve as a representative of Taiwan. In 1997, Chang was appointed Taiwan's first woman ambassador when she accepted a post to St Kitts and Nevis and Dominica. Upon succeeding Henry Chen as director-general of the Department of Information and Cultural Affairs, Chang became the Ministry of Foreign Affairs first spokeswoman. She was the ROC representative to the United Kingdom from 2007 to 2011 and to Australia from 2011 to 2014. The next year, she was appointed to lead the Taipei Economic and Cultural Representative Office in the United States. In 2016, Chang was named the minister of the Mainland Affairs Council. She left the Mainland Affairs Council in February 2018, and succeeded Tien Hung-mao as leader of the Straits Exchange Foundation that March. Chang was replaced at the SEF by David Lee on 5 June 2020. Chang subsequently chaired the Taiwan–Hong Kong Economic and Cultural Co-operation Council. In September of the same year, she began serving as Taiwanese representative to Austria.
