= Australia–Taiwan relations =

- Australia: Taiwan

Diplomatic mission
- Australian Office, Taipei: Taipei Economic and Cultural Office, Canberra

Envoy
- Representative Robert Fergusson: Representative Douglas Yu-tien Hsu

Relations between the Commonwealth of Australia and the Republic of China, date back to 1909. The two countries had official diplomatic relations from 1941 to 1972. Since 1972, Australia no longer has formal diplomatic relations with Republic of China (Taiwan). Australia and Taiwan share partnership in the inter-governmental Global Cooperation and Training Framework (GCTF) activities.

Australia's current position towards Taiwan is largely based on the Joint Communiqué with the People's Republic of China signed by the Whitlam Labor government in 1972 on the outcome of UN Resolution 2758 as international situation turned against ROC, even though Australia voted supporting Republic of China's seat in the UN instead of Communist China. Under this agreement, the Australian government diplomatically recognises the People's Republic of China (PRC) as the 'sole legitimate government of China'.

The Joint Communiqué establishes '(diplomatic) guidelines for official Australian contact with Taiwan,' explicitly stating that Australia 'does not (diplomatically) consider Taiwan (ROC) to have the status of national government.' Despite the Australian government not having an official diplomatic relationship with Taiwan, an official Bilateral Economic Consultation is held annually by high-ranking Ministry of Economy officials of both sides and there is a substantial unofficial relationship has developed through cultural and trade links, however, other than conventional industry, Australian firms rely on a mature international financial market to capitalise from the strong scientific/growing technical research due to high tax rate in Australia, and Taiwan does not have this attribute, but Taiwan's highly Americanized specialist workforce may assist Australia's firms to internationalise the vision, especially with the competency on analytical research. Therefore, it is likely Taiwan may benefit from the relations with Australia on University spin-off rather than research spin-off. On international trade, Australia and Taiwan are complementary.

== Trade ==
Monthly value of Taiwanese merchandise exports to Australia (A$ millions) since 1988

Monthly value of Australian merchandise exports to Taiwan (A$ millions) since 1988

Taiwan and Australia have developed strong economic and trade links, with Taiwan currently being Australia's ninth largest customer for exports. The value of exports between both Australia and Taiwan equates to more than A$12 billion. The Australia-Taiwan Business Council is based in Sydney, and Taiwan has an official, government-sponsored branch office of the Taiwan External Trade Development Council in Sydney.

== History ==
=== Before 1972 ===
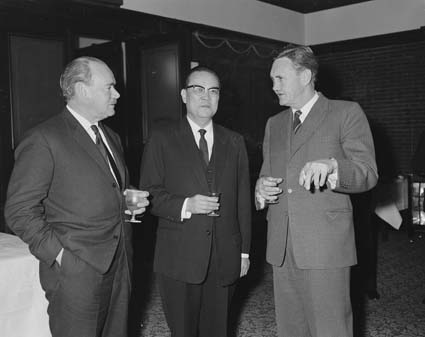
ROC Foreign Minister Shen Chang-huan on his 1965 goodwill visit to Australia, conversing with Governor-General Paul Hasluck (left) and Senator John Gorton

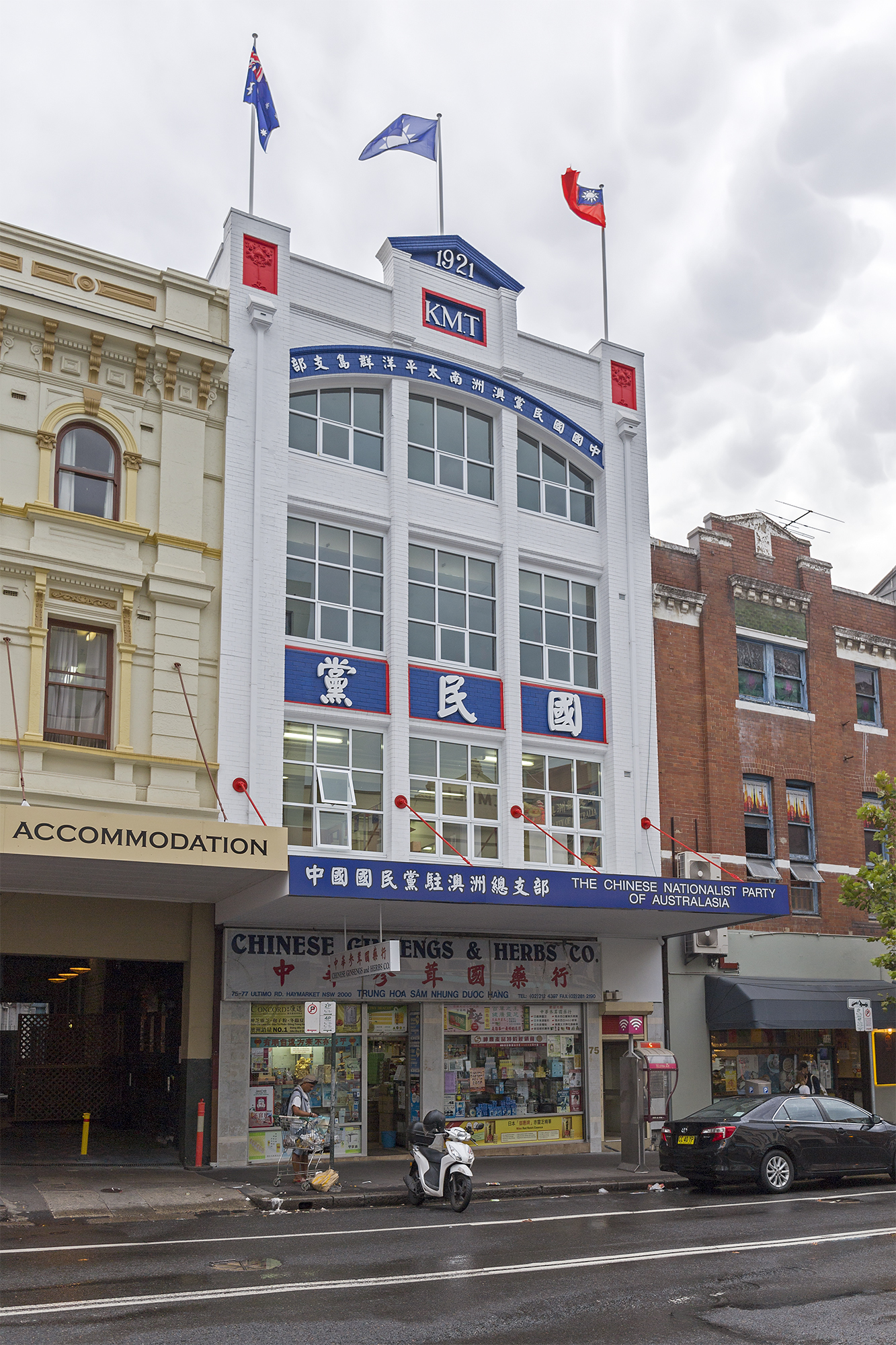
Kuomintang office of Australasia in Sydney.

As Taiwan was under Japanese control, prior to 1941, relations between the Republic of China and Australia were described as 'episodic.' One reason for this was Australia's reliance on Britain, as it was only in 1923 that Britain had granted its dominions permission to conclude treaties with foreign countries. Subsequently, Australia sent its first Minister Plenipotentiary to China, Sir Frederic Eggleston on 20 October 1941. The embassy based in Chungking was the third such post when Australia gained its on external affairs and already had diplomatic missions to London and Washington.

Australia's relations with the ROC between 1949 and 1971 operated in a political environment which has been coined the 'China question', a term used to encompass the 'contest between two rival authorities, each claiming to represent the one China.' Since 1949, China has insisted that Taiwan is part of the PRC, while the ROC on Taiwan contends that it is an independent state which was subjected to controversy after Japan surrendered at World War II. From 1949 to 1971, Taiwan and its affiliated organisations and conventions were represented in the UN by officials of the 'Republic of China in Taipei.' Under this title, Taiwan entered into and became a party to a number of multilateral treaties and conventions sponsored by the UN and other bodies, despite certain countries, predominantly in the Eastern bloc, opposing Taiwan's legal ability to enter into such arrangements.

The Australian policy towards Taiwan before 1972 has been described as one of ambivalence. During the 1950s Australia's relationship with Taiwan was not particularly close. There were official diplomatic relations as Australia did not believe in the "One-China" policy at this time, and some Australian officials visited Taiwan during this period. These included Sir Arthur Tange, Secretary for External Affairs in October 1957 and then-Senator John Gorton in November 1960. Nevertheless, Taiwan refused to appoint an ambassador between 1951 and 1959 in protest over Australia's indifference towards Taiwan.

On 11 June 1966, the Australian government, under the direction of the Holt Liberal government, established an embassy in Taipei. This was an unusual decision given the socio-political climate at the time. During this period the Soviet Bloc, India, Pakistan, Burma and France officially recognised the PRC. Australia's decision to "go against the international diplomatic current" was due to a combination of anti-communist sentiment, Australia's participation in the Vietnam war, and Australia's close relationship with the US.

Despite these tensions, Australia's economic relationship with the PRC grew substantially. Strong trade relations were established during the 1950s–1960s, with wool, iron and later wheat the predominant Australian exports. In 1956 an Australian Trade commissioner was sent to Taipei to consider the development of trade between Taiwan and Australia. In November 1958 and March 1959 a commercial counsellor from Manila was sent to Taipei on 'instructions from Canberra to strengthen relations between the two countries.'

=== 1972–1990 ===
International affairs in 1971 contributed to Australia's decision to officially recognise the PRC. During this period there were a series of Pacific Islands Independence Movements, and the UN decided to reject the claim by the Republic of China (Taiwan) to independent statehood. Following this announcement, a policy of non-interference in Taiwan issues along with deliberate ambiguity was adopted by the UN. Australia followed the general political atmosphere of the time in recognising Beijing, culminating in the 21 December Joint Communiqué with the PRC. The technical language and terms agreed upon in this document were also utilised by declarations between the PRC and Canada, Italy and other states.

Following the Joint Communiqué with the PRC, official diplomatic links with Taiwan were discontinued, with officials and diplomatic passport holders being prohibited by the Whitlam government from visiting each other's countries. An unofficial organisation known as the "Australia-Free China Society", headed by New South Wales MP Douglas Darby, established an office in 1974 to provide services for Australians visiting Taiwan.

Later, relations resumed on an unofficial basis. In 1981, the Australian Commerce and Industry office (ACIO) was established in Taiwan, which acted as an unofficial Australian organisation for trade representatives, as well as tourist promotion and visa application. It was based in Canberra to provide an active connection between the business sector and government departments and ACIO. In October 1988, the Taiwan Marketing Service (TMS) was established as a Taiwanese equivalent in Australia to the ACIO in Taiwan.

In March 1990, an Australian education centre was created in Taipei to promote mutual student and cultural exchange. In addition, since 1989 Taiwan began focusing on a policy of 'flexible diplomacy,' which included an emphasis on creating informal relations or 'substantial relations' rather than formal diplomatic relations. This policy was embodied in the creation of Taipei Economic and Cultural Representative Offices in various countries, with more than 50 such offices currently located around the world.

Australia and Taiwan used other documents that were not technically legally binding to develop their unofficial relationship. These included Memorandums of Understanding, which under Australia law are not documents to which the Vienna Convention on the Law of Treaties applies. Instead, such agreements encourage relations between states on a 'moral and political basis.' Arrangements were made on a variety of topics such as access by Taiwanese fishing vessels to Australia's Exclusive economic zone, which were established in 1979 and 1986.

=== 1990 to present ===
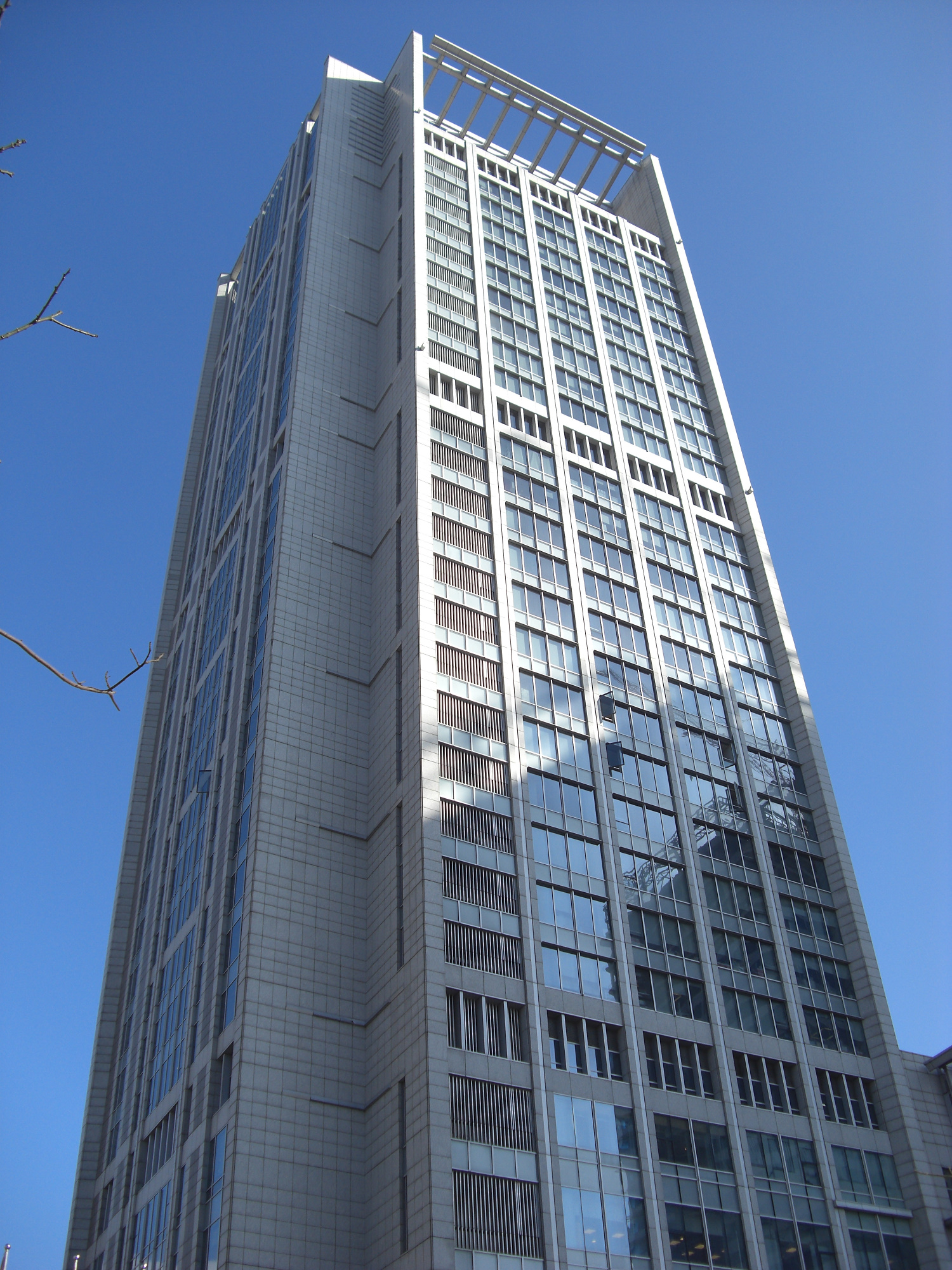
The Australian Office in Taipei is located at the Uni-President International Tower.

A review on Australia's policy towards Taiwan was undertaken and on 26 November 1990, the Minister for Technology and Commerce, Senator John Button, declared government support for closer Australia economic relations with Taiwan. The 1989 Tiananmen Square protests and massacre led to increased tensions between the PRC and Australia, thus contributing to a closer relationship with Taiwan. The incident reportedly shocked Australia and Prime Minister Bob Hawke publicly cried at the memorial service for the victims who were killed. Another factor that contributed to closer unofficial relations was the 'democratisation' of Taiwan. Legislation was passed to protect Taiwanese investment products in Australia, as the Taiwanese government feared that the PRC may claim them.

Australia's trade with Taiwan in 1993 amounted to $5.1 billion, while trade with the PRC was slightly greater at $5.2 billion. In 1992, Taiwan was Australia's fourth-largest Asian trading partner and seventh most important overall. Despite Taiwan's inability to conclude multilateral treaties, Australia has concluded various bilateral agreements with Taiwan. This includes establishing direct air links with Taiwan in 1991, which saw an increase in tourism resulting in Taiwan becoming Australia's third largest market in Asia. The period to receive an Australian visa in Taiwan was reduced to 48 hours, and a memorandum of understanding was agreed relating to 'the promotion of investment and technology transfer and to the protection of intellectual property'.

Political and cultural links also improved. The Taipei Economic and Cultural Office was formally opened by Senator Gareth Evans in March 1991. Ministerial visits increased in the early 1990s, beginning with the visit of Tourism and Resources Minister Alan Griffiths in October 1992.

The 1996 Taiwan Straits Crisis affected Australia's relationship with both Taiwan and the PRC. The PRC fired missiles close to Taiwan in an attempt to influence Taiwanese political elections. Australia's response to the crisis was that Beijing should exercise 'constraint'. This was expressed by Alexander Downer, who had recently been appointed Foreign Minister in the Howard government. Australia supported the US reaction of deploying two aircraft carriers to the east of Taiwan. These events caused tension with the PRC, as they perceived that the US was executing a 'new containment strategy in which Australia and Japan were anchors.' Consequently, Australia-China relations suffered during this period, demonstrating the sensitivity of the Taiwan issue.

Following the crisis, the Howard government attempted to strengthen relations with the PRC, resulting in reaffirming its "One-China" policy stance. This was achieved through a series of ministerial and official visits by Australian diplomats, politicians and other government representatives. In September 1996, the chief of the Australian Defence Force (ADF), General John Baker, visited China to seek an 'upgrade in Sino-Australian exchanges on defence and strategic issues as a 'confidence-building' measure.' This culminated in an agreement in 1997 to start a range of annual PRC-Australia talks focused on security within the Asia Pacific region. In addition, there were agreements for the exchange of military professionals and officials to attend each other's strategic studies Institutes. When Howard visited the PRC, he not only stressed Australia's stand on the "One-China" policy, but also emphasised that Australia's national interests would be decided independently of US policy direction.

In the late 1990s and early 2000s Taiwan's checkbook diplomacy and competing policy goals in the Pacific lead to clashes with Australia over Papua New Guinea, the Solomon Islands, and Vanuatu.

In the later 1990s, Australia's relations with Taiwan were largely influenced by what has been called the 'Armitage Scenario'. In 1999, Richard Armitage, former US Assistant Secretary of Defence, visited Australia and expressed that should a conflict arise, the United States would 'demand Australian support, including military support if demanded.' If Australia did not agree to this arrangement, ANZUS would be concluded. This placed Australia in a precarious position with the PRC, which was encompassed in a statement released by an aide of Jiang Zemin, saying that Australia faced 'very serious consequences' if it sided with the US in a future Taiwan conflict. Following those events, Jiang made a state visit to Australia, during which Howard reassured him Australia still followed the "One-China" policy.

This placed Australia in a complicated political situation, as Australia was still trying to retain its economic and cultural relationship with Taiwan. This led to Howard implementing a 'dual policy' towards the China-Taiwan issue, in which it encouraged the PRC to 'exercise restraint in issuing threats of using military force against Taiwan.' This was emphasised by Australian government officials, particularly from DFAT, when they met with the PRC's Ambassador to Australia to express their concern over a white paper intimating the PRC would employ force against Taiwan if it failed to negotiate unification expeditiously.

In August 2024, the Parliament of Australia formally condemned China's use of United Nations General Assembly Resolution 2758. The parliament declared that UN Resolution 2758, "does not establish the People's Republic of China's sovereignty over Taiwan and does not determine the future status of Taiwan in the UN".

== Public opinion ==
Australians tend to be very pro-Taiwan due to the widespread belief that China poses a threat to national security. In 2022, a poll conducted by the Lowy Institute showed that 51% of Australians would support sending military support to Taiwan if China were to invade, up from 43% in 2021. The same survey showed only 12% trusted China on foreign affairs, down from 16% in 2021 and 52% in 2018. Two thirds supported Taiwanese independence in 2021.

== See also ==
- Australian Office, Taipei
- Taipei Economic and Cultural Office, Canberra
