= Lee Li-chen =

Taiwanese politician

- 李麗珍
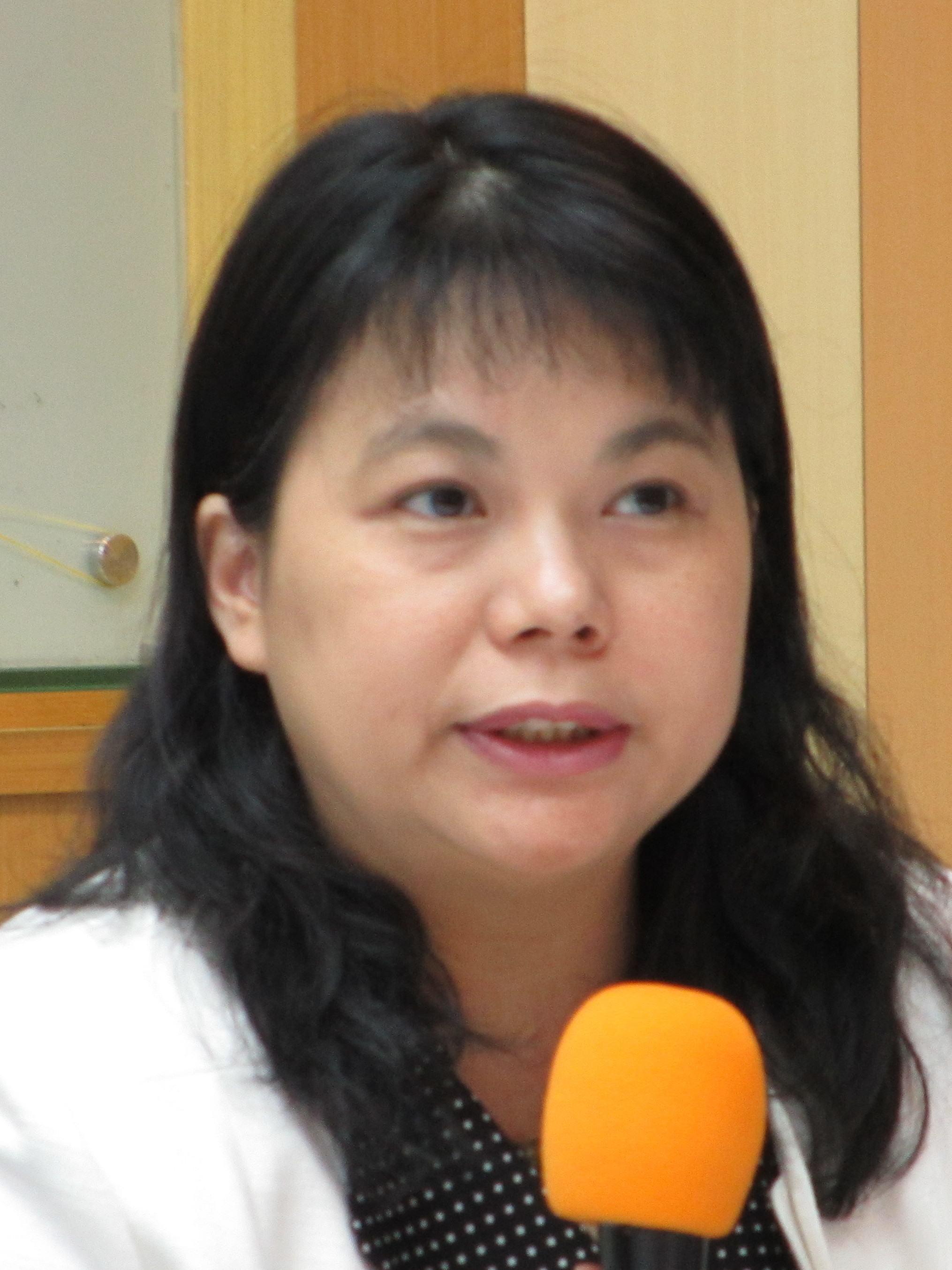

Deputy Minister of Mainland Affairs Council of the Republic of China
- Incumbent
- Assumed office 2 July 2018 Serving with Chiu Chui-cheng, Wu Mei-hung
- Minister: Chen Ming-tong; Chiu Tai-san; Chiu Chui-cheng
- Preceded by: Chang Tien-chin

Personal details
- Education: National Chung Hsing University (BA, MA)

Lee Li-chen (traditional Chinese: 李麗珍; simplified Chinese: 李丽珍; pinyin: Lǐ Lìzhēn) is a Taiwanese politician.

== Education ==
Lee obtained her bachelor's degree in public administration in June 1988 and master's degree in economic policy in July 1990 from National Chung Hsing University.

== Careers ==
She was an associate researcher at the Research, Development and Evaluation Commission in 1990-2001, officer, senior officer, section chief, assistant director-general, senior adviser, deputy director-general, director-general of the Department of Economic Affairs of Mainland Affairs Council (MAC) in 1999-2016, deputy secretary-general and spokesperson of Straits Exchange Foundation in 2016-2017 and secretary-general of MAC in 2016-2018.

In June 2018, it was announced that she would be the Deputy Minister of Mainland Affairs Council starting 2 July 2018.

== See also ==
- Executive Yuan
