= Elliott Charng =

Diplomat of Taiwan

- 常以立
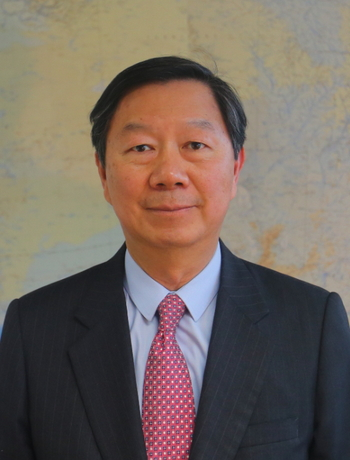

ROC Representative to Australia
- Incumbent
- Assumed office October 2016
- Preceded by: David Lee; William Lin (acting)

ROC Representative to New Zealand
- In office February 2011 – July 2014

ROC Deputy Representative to India
- In office February 2006 – June 2008

Personal details
- Education: National Chung Hsing University (BA); George Washington University (MA)

Elliott Charng (Chinese: 常以立; pinyin: Cháng Yǐlì) is a diplomat of the Republic of China. He is currently the representative to Australia.

== Education ==
Charng obtained his bachelor's degree from National Chung Hsing University and master's degree in international affairs from George Washington University's Elliott School of International Affairs, in the United States.

== Taipei Economic and Cultural Office in New Zealand ==
On 10 July 2013, Charng signed the Agreement between New Zealand and the Separate Customs Territory of Taiwan, Penghu, Kinmen and Matsu on Economic Cooperation (ANZTEC) with his New Zealand counterpart Stephen Payton in Wellington. The agreement comprises 25 chapters on bilateral trading matters between the two sides.
