= Shen Fa-hui =

Taiwanese politician

Shen Fai-hui MLY
- 沈發惠
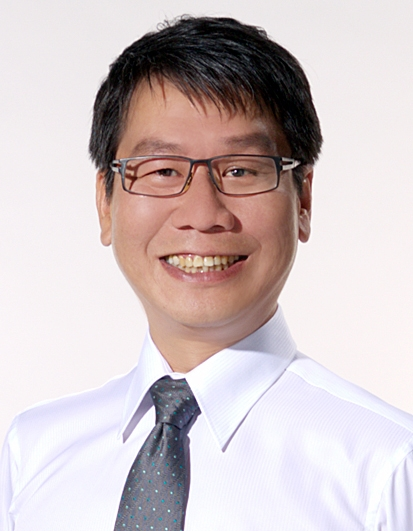
- Shen as a member of the 10th Legislative Yuan

Member of the Legislative Yuan
- Incumbent
- Assumed office 1 February 2020
- Constituency: Republic of China
- In office 1 February 2005 – 31 January 2008
- Constituency: Taipei County 3

Member of the New Taipei City Council
- In office 25 December 2010 – 24 December 2018

Member of the Taipei County Council
- In office 1 March 1998 – 31 January 2005

Personal details
- Born: 2 November 1966 (age 60) Xizhi, Taipei County, Taiwan
- Party: Democratic Progressive Party
- Education: Tunghai University (LLB); National Taiwan University (MA)
- Profession: Lawyer

Shen Fa-hui (Chinese: 沈發惠; pinyin: Shěn Fāhuì; born 2 November 1966) is a Taiwanese politician. He has served as a member of the Legislative Yuan and has been affiliated with the Democratic Progressive Party (DPP). He has also held local party and public service positions during his political career.

== Early life and education ==
Shen born on 2 November 1966, in Xizhi District, Taipei County. His father and paternal grandfather were from Houlong, Miaoli County. His father, Shen You-ren (沈友仁), was a physician specializing in pediatric neurology who was a superintendent of National Taiwan University Hospital. His mother, Yu Hsiu-ying (余秀瑛), was a professor of pharmacy at National Taiwan University. Hsiu-ying earned her doctorate from the University of Tokyo in pharmacokinetics.

Shen developed an interest in opposition politics while attending junior high school, when he began reading magazines associated with the Tangwai movement. After high school, he earned his law degree from Tunghai University. While attending university, he became involved in student activism and the publication of Dongchao (東潮), an underground magazine associated with the dissident student organization Donghai Chuilang zhi Jing (東海吹浪之鯨). In 1990, Shen served on the decision-making committee of the Wild Lily student movement.

Shen later earned a master's degree in political science from National Taiwan University in 2012. His master's thesis was titled, A Study of Mainland Chinese Tourists' Consumption Behavior in Taiwan: Perspectives of Tourism Retailers and Sales Personnel on the North Coast (大陸觀光客來台消費行為研究—以北海岸旅遊零售業者及銷售人員觀點為例). Chen Ming-tong was his thesis advisor.

== Political career ==
Within the Democratic Progressive Party, Shen was affiliated with the New Tide faction. He has also led the DPP's Policy Committee. Following his tenure within the policy committee, Shen became a member of the party's central standing committee.

Shen served on the Taipei County Council from 1998 to 2005, when he was elected to the Legislative Yuan. He ended his reelection campaign in May 2007, after losing a party primary, and returned to work for Frank Hsieh. Shen was elected to the New Taipei City Council in 2010. He lost a legislative bid in 2012, but was reelected to the NTCC in 2014. In 2015, the Taiwan High Court ruled that Shen and nine other city council members were not guilty of displaying their vote in a council speakership election held by secret ballot in 2010. Shen was supportive of Sunflower Student Movement activist and academic Huang Kuo-chang's 2016 legislative campaign. Shen stepped down from the New Taipei City Council at the end of his second term in 2018, and returned to the Legislative Yuan in 2020. Shen won a second consecutive term on the Legislative Yuan in 2024, and his third term overall.
