= James C. F. Huang =

Taiwanese diplomat

- 黃志芳
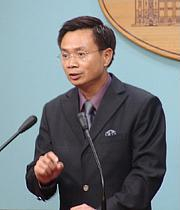

Minister of Foreign Affairs
- In office 25 January 2006 – 6 May 2008
- Premier: Su Tseng-Chang; Chang Chun-hsiung
- Deputy: Yang Tzu-pao
- Preceded by: Mark Chen
- Succeeded by: Francisco Ou

Personal details
- Born: 14 September 1958 (age 67) Tainan, Taiwan
- Education: National Taiwan University (BA)

James Chih-Fang Huang (traditional Chinese: 黃志芳; simplified Chinese: 黄志芳; pinyin: Huáng Zhìfāng; Wade–Giles: Huáng Chìh-fāng; Pe̍h-ōe-jī: N̂g Chì-phang; born September 14, 1958) is a Taiwanese diplomat who served as the Minister of Foreign Affairs from 2006 to 2008.

== Education ==
Huang earned a bachelor's degree in political science from National Taiwan University.

== Political career ==
Huang began working for Chen Chien-jen in 1985, as Chen's secretary. Huang then became the English interpreter for Lien Chan and Vincent Siew. He joined the Mainland Affairs Council in 1999, and left in 2002, when he began working directly for President Chen Shui-bian. Huang began his tenure in the Presidential Office as a spokesman and was later promoted to deputy chief of staff. On 25 January 2006, Huang replaced Mark Chen as foreign minister. In June 2007, Huang submitted his resignation to President Chen following the severing of ties between Costa Rica and the Republic of China. However, Chen rejected Huang's resignation. In May 2008, days before his term was to expire with the outgoing Chen administration, Huang resigned over the loss of public money equivalent to US$30 million during a controversial failed attempt to secure diplomatic ties with Papua New Guinea. Tsai Ing-wen announced her intent to pursue a "southbound policy" during her 2016 presidential campaign. Huang became the first director of the New Southbound Policy Office after Tsai took office as president. In January 2017, Huang was appointed as the Chairman of the Taiwan External Trade Development Council.

Government offices
Preceded by Mark Chen	ROC Foreign Minister; 2006–2008	Succeeded by Francisco Ou
