= Taipei Economic and Cultural Office, Canberra =

De facto embassy of Taiwan in Australia

Taipei Economic and Cultural Office in Australia
- 駐澳大利亞代表處

Agency overview
- Formed: 1988 (as Taiwan Marketing Services); 1991 (as Taipei Economic and Cultural Office)
- Jurisdiction: Australia; Tonga; Kiribati; Solomon Islands
- Headquarters: Barton, Canberra, Canberra
- Agency executive: Douglas Yu-tien Hsu, Representative
- Website: Taipei Economic and Cultural Office in Australia

The Taipei Economic and Cultural Office in Australia (TECO; Chinese: 駐澳大利亞代表處; pinyin: Zhù Àodàlìyǎ Dàibiǎo Chù) represents interests of Taiwan in Australia in the absence of formal diplomatic relations, functioning as a de facto embassy.

The Office is headed by a Representative, currently Elliott Charng.

Its head office is in Canberra, but it also has branch offices in Sydney, Melbourne and Brisbane.

It was established in 1988 as the "Taiwan Marketing Service" office, before becoming the "Taipei Economic and Cultural Office" in 1991, along with the "Far East Trading Company" offices in Sydney and Melbourne, established in 1979. An unofficial organization known as the Australia-Free China Society, headed by New South Wales MP Douglas Darby, also represented Taiwan in Australia from 1974.

Its counterpart in Taiwan is the Australian Office in Taipei, formerly the Australian Commerce and Industry Office.

== Organizational structures ==
- Public Affairs Division
- Cultural Division
- Economic Division
- Information Division
- Science and Technology Division

== Missions and consular districts ==
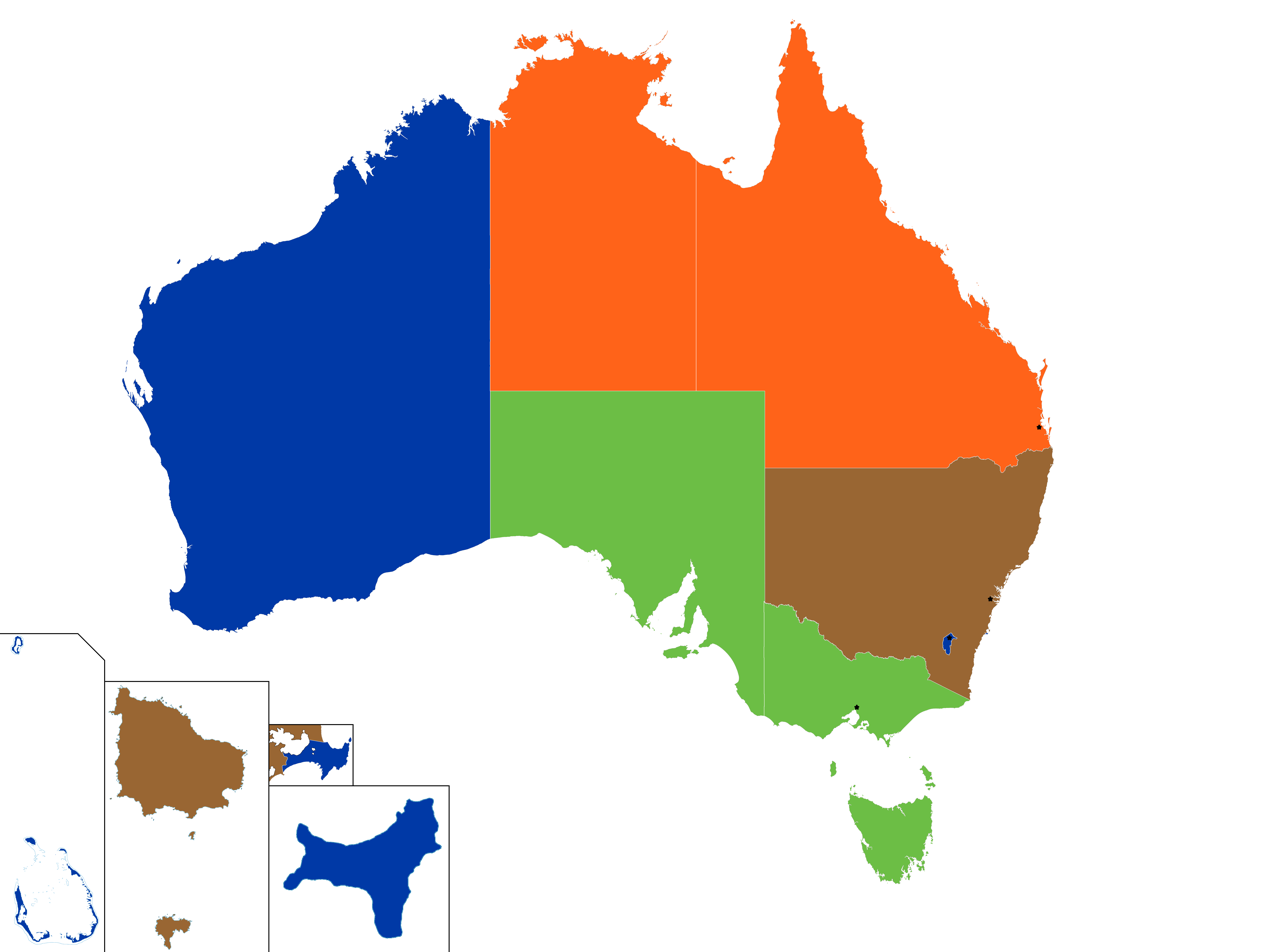

Missions	Consular districts
Taipei Economic and Cultural Office in Australia	Australian Capital Territory (Jervis Bay Territory), Western Australia (Shire of Cocos (Keeling) Islands, Shire of Christmas Island)
Taipei Economic and Cultural Office, Brisbane	Queensland, Northern Territory
Taipei Economic and Cultural Office, Melbourne	Victoria, South Australia, Tasmania
Taipei Economic and Cultural Office, Sydney	New South Wales (Norfolk Island)

== List of representatives ==
- Timothy Yang (2000–2005)
- Katharine Chang (December 2011 – 31 December 2014)
- David Lee (1 January 2015 – ?)
- William Lin (acting, ? – October 2016)
- Elliott Charng (October 2016 –August 2023)
- Douglas Yu-tien Hsu (August 2023 –)

== See also ==
- Australia–Taiwan relations
