= Yu Beichen =

Taiwanese former major general

Keven Yu Yu Beichen
- 于北辰
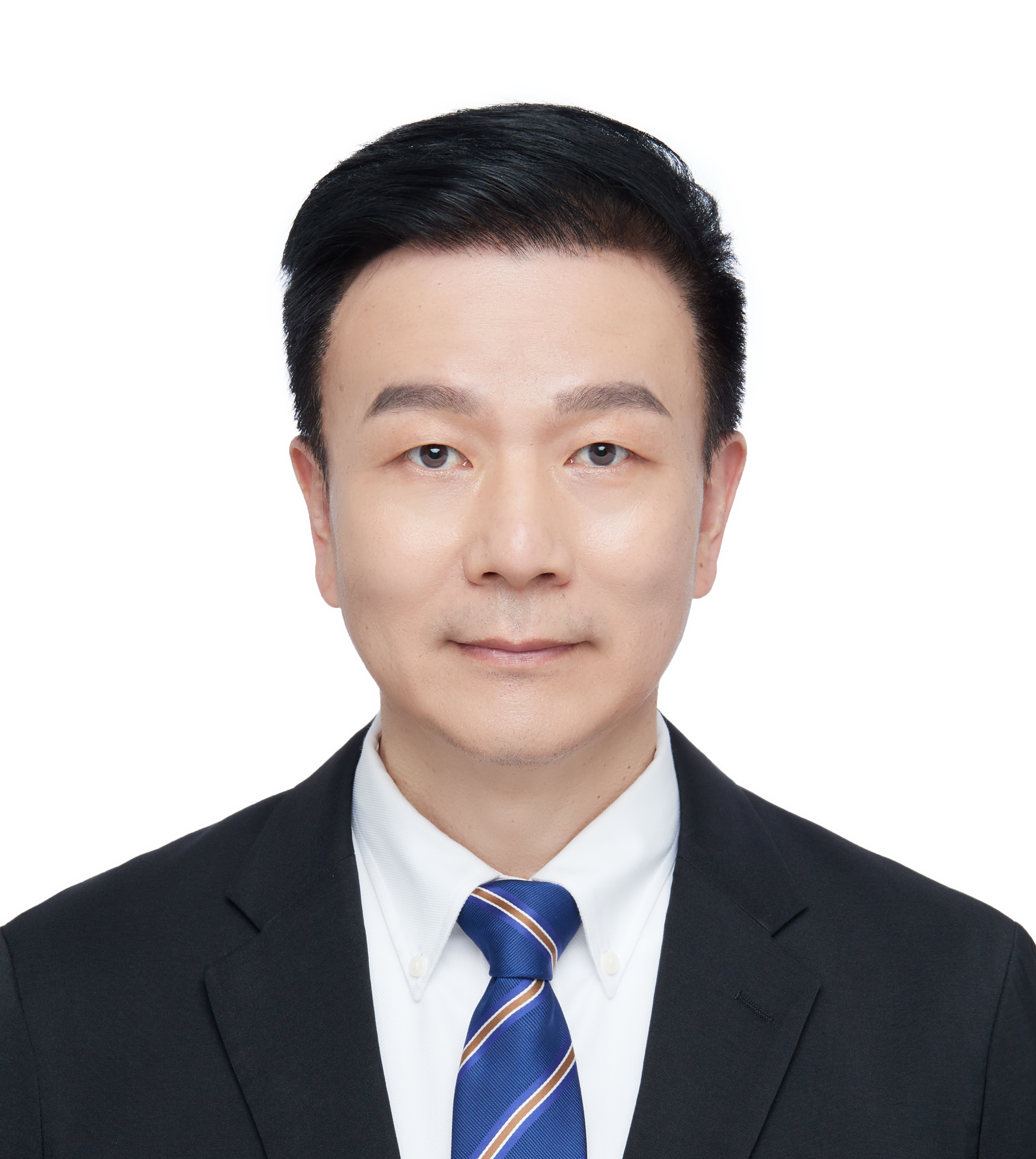
- Official portrait, 2022

Taoyuan City Councillor
- Incumbent
- Assumed office 25 December 2022
- Constituency: Taoyuan I

Personal details
- Born: January 2, 1968 (age 58) Wenshan, Taipei, Taiwan
- Party: Non-Partisan Solidarity Union (2022–)
- Other political affiliations: Kuomintang (1985–31 December 2021)
- Spouse: Hsu Hsiaofeng (徐小鳳)
- Education: Republic of China Military Academy (BS)
- Nickname: Donate General (抖內將軍)
- Military career
- Allegiance: Taiwan
- Branch: Republic of China Army
- Service years: 1990-2015
- Rank: Major General
- Unit: 542 Armor Brigade

Yu Beichen (Chinese: 于北辰, Wade–Giles: Yu Pei-chen; born 2 January 1968), also known as Keven Yu, is a Taiwanese politician and former major general in the Republic of China Army. He was previously a military officer under Kao Hua-chu and General Lee Hsiang-chou. He was involved in Taiwanese politics after his retirement and currently runs his own YouTube channel under the nickname of the “Donated-General”.

== Early life and education ==
Yu Beichen was born on January 2, 1968, in Taipei. His family's ancestral home is in Shandong. He graduated from the Republic of China Military Academy with a Bachelor of Science (B.S.) specializing in mechanical engineering in 1979.

== Military career ==
He joined the military in 1990. He moved up the ranks and was a major general at the time of his retirement in 2015. In 2015, citing concerns relating to his health and work-related stress, he retired from the military.

== Political career ==
He was a member of the Kuomintang party in Taiwan from 1985 to 2021. After his retirement from the military, he served as chairman of Huangfuxing's Taoyuan Kuomintang party headquarters, as well as the vice-chairman of the KMT's Taoyuan city party headquarters. He was dismissed from these roles in 2020. Later, at the end of 2021, he publicly announced that he was quitting the Kuomintang party over disagreements regarding the party's direction, including disagreement about a lack of strength in standing up to China.

In January 2022, he announced his councilorship campaign for the 2022 Taiwanese local elections at the Taoyuan District constituency in Taoyuan City as an independent candidate and was successfully elected in November.

In 2024, the Taiwan Affairs Office added Yu into the sanctions list for being a "diehard "Taiwan independence" separatist". He described it as a medal of honor.

== Commentator ==
He currently has his own YouTube channel with over 100,000 subscribers as of May 2022. He has appeared in political talk shows in Taiwan. In May 2022, he criticized Chen Ming-tong; the director-general of the National Security Bureau of Taiwan for publicly revealing specific intelligence regarding Chinese plans for invading Taiwan and the makeup of Xi Jinping's cabinet following the 20th National Congress of the Chinese Communist Party.

== Controversy ==
On August 4, 2022, Yu Beichen said on a TV program: "Usually, the interception rate of the Tiangong missile is about 70%, so if I launch three to intercept one, it will be 210%, how could it not be intercepted?" He also claimed that "it must be three, using a method of trigonometric functions to intercept," stating that if it can't be intercepted in this way, National Chung-Shan Institute of Science and Technology can close down. This statement has sparked ridicule from netizens on both sides of the strait.
