= Edgar Lin =

Taiwanese biologist, ecologist and politician (1938–2025)

Lin Chun-yi
- 林俊義

Director of the Coordination Council for North American Affairs
- In office 17 August 2007 – 20 May 2008
- Preceded by: Lin Fang-mei
- Succeeded by: Chu Wen-hsiang (acting); Shao Yu-ming

ROC Representative to the United Kingdom
- In office December 2004 – August 2007
- Preceded by: Tien Hung-mao
- Succeeded by: Katharine Chang

ROC Ambassador to Gambia
- In office August 2001 – December 2004
- Preceded by: Lee Cheng-hsiung
- Succeeded by: Patrick Chang

Minister of the Environmental Protection Administration
- In office 20 May 2000 – 6 March 2001
- Preceded by: Tsai Hsun-hsiung
- Succeeded by: Hau Lung-pin

Head of the Taipei Department of Environmental Protection
- In office 17 October 1995 – 9 August 1997
- Preceded by: Chen Chin-yang
- Succeeded by: Liu Shyh-fang

Member of the National Assembly
- In office 1 February 1992 – 31 January 1996

Personal details
- Born: 23 July 1938 Taihoku, Taihoku Prefecture, Taiwan, Empire of Japan
- Died: 13 November 2025 (aged 87)
- Party: Democratic Progressive Party
- Education: National Taiwan University (BA); National Taiwan Normal University (MA); Indiana University (MS, PhD)

Lin Chun-yi (Chinese: 林俊義; 23 July 1938 – 13 November 2025), also known by his English name Edgar Lin, was a Taiwanese biologist, ecologist, diplomat, and politician.

== Early life and education ==
Lin was born in Taipei in 1938. He graduated from National Taiwan University with a bachelor's degree in foreign languages and literature and obtained a master's degree in English from National Taiwan Normal University. Lin then completed doctoral studies in the United States, earning a Master of Science (M.S.) and his Ph.D. in ecology and zoology from Indiana University in 1975. His doctoral dissertation was titled, "Comparative reproductive biology of two sympatric tropical lizards: Chamaeleo hohneli and Chamaeleo jacksoni".

== Academic career ==
After receiving his doctorate, he remained in the United States for a time, working as a research fellow for the House of Representatives Committee on Science, Space and Technology.

After his return to Taiwan, Lin taught at Tunghai University. Lin began participating in Taiwan's environmental movement in the 1980s. He became known as a "godfather" of the cause and was a noted anti-nuclear activist, later serving Greenpeace Taiwan as its president.

== Political career ==
Lin ran in the 1989 legislative election for a Legislative Yuan seat in Taichung, as one of the "Five Tigers" electoral coalition, alongside fellow legislative candidate Liu Wen-hsiung, mayoral candidate Hsu Jung-shu, and provincial councilor candidates Chang Wen-ying and Ho Chun-mu. His unsuccessful campaign was backed by the Democratic Progressive Party. He was elected to the National Assembly in 1992. The National Assembly voted to block a set of reform proposals after its convocation. Alongside fellow Democratic Progressive Party members Huang Hsin-chieh and Chen Yung-hsing, Lin walked out of the assembly on 4 May 1992, criticizing the body for procedural violations. In September 1993, Lin accepted the DPP nomination as its candidate for the Taichung mayoralty. Lin lost to Lin Po-jung, who secured a second consecutive term.

Lin led Taipei's Bureau of Environmental Protection while Chen Shui-bian was mayor. Chen was elected president in 2000, and Lin was appointed minister of the Environmental Protection Administration by Premier Tang Fei in April, taking office with the rest of the cabinet on 20 May. Shortly after joining the EPA, Lin renounced his opposition to nuclear energy, stating that he had held that stance largely to combat totalitarianism. In October, Lin made his first trip to the United States in an official capacity and became the first EPA executive to include environmentalists as part of his contingent abroad. The Amorgos oil spill occurred in January 2001, and the Executive Yuan was criticized for its delayed response. Subsequently, Lin resigned his position in March.

In August of that year, Lin was named ambassador to The Gambia. He served until December 2004, when he was sworn in as Taiwan's representative to the United Kingdom. His first trip in the United Kingdom took place the next month. While in the United Kingdom, Lin spoke out against the One China principle, Anti-Secession Law, and one country, two systems. Instead, Lin proposed that the European Union pass its own version of the United States' Taiwan Relations Act.

== Later life and death ==
Lin and his American wife, who preceded him in death, had three children. In retirement, Lin lived alone in Tamsui, and was diagnosed with Alzheimer's disease. He died on 13 November 2025, at the age of 87.
