= Michelle Lin =

Taiwanese news presenter and politician

Lin Chu-yin MLY
- 林楚茵
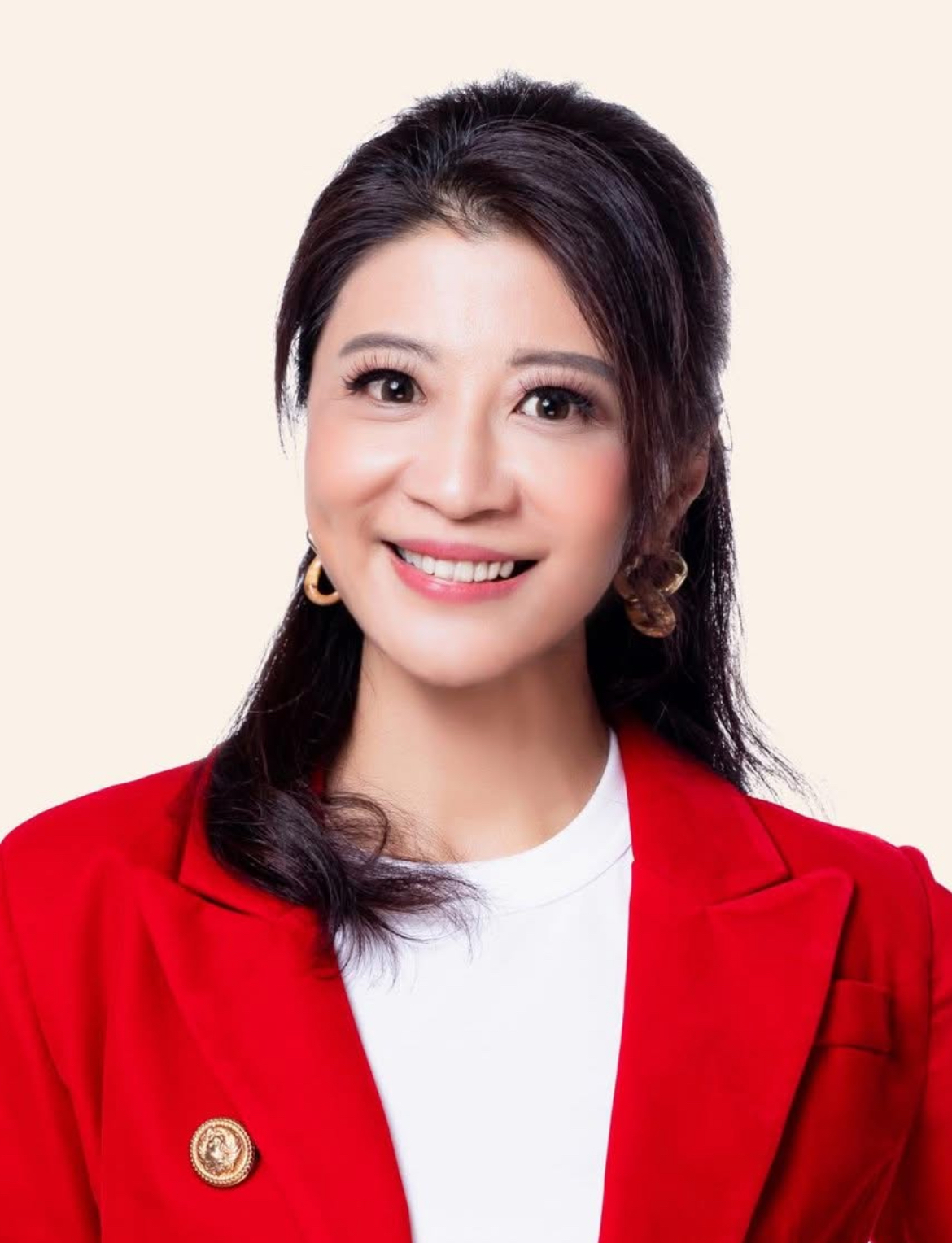
- Official portrait, 2024

Member of the Legislative Yuan
- Incumbent
- Assumed office 1 February 2020
- Constituency: Party-list (DPP)
- Chairman: William Lai

Personal details
- Born: 10 October 1972 (age 53) Taipei, Taiwan
- Party: Democratic Progressive Party
- Education: Soochow University (BA)

Lin Chu-yin (Chinese: 林楚茵; pinyin: Lín Chǔyīn; born 10 October 1972), also known by her English name Michelle Lin, is a Taiwanese politician and news presenter who is currently a member of the Legislative Yuan.

== Early life and education ==
Lin received a bachelor's degree in politics from Soochow University in Taipei. Lin was a news anchor for TVBS News and later on with SET News.

== Political career ==
Lin was elected to the Legislative Yuan in 2020 via the Democratic Progressive Party proportional representation party list. As a legislator, she has been active in discussions regarding banking, journalism, and online scams.

In June 2022, Lin voiced her support for the redesign of the International Driving Permit issued by Taiwan's Directorate-General of Highways, with the cover now highlighting the word "Taiwan" in large font. The highway authority redesigned the cover after complaints from Taiwanese tourists driving overseas that they were often mistaken for Chinese. Lin cited the example of the recent Taiwan passport redesign as an appropriate precedent.

She was reelected to the Legislative Yuan in 2024, and became the founding leader of the France Inter-Parliamentary Amity Association and the Taiwan-Poland Inter-Parliamentary Amity Association within the 11th Legislative Yuan.

== Personal life ==
Lin married Liang Wen-chieh in 2007.
