= Australian Office, Taipei =

Representative of Australia in Taiwan

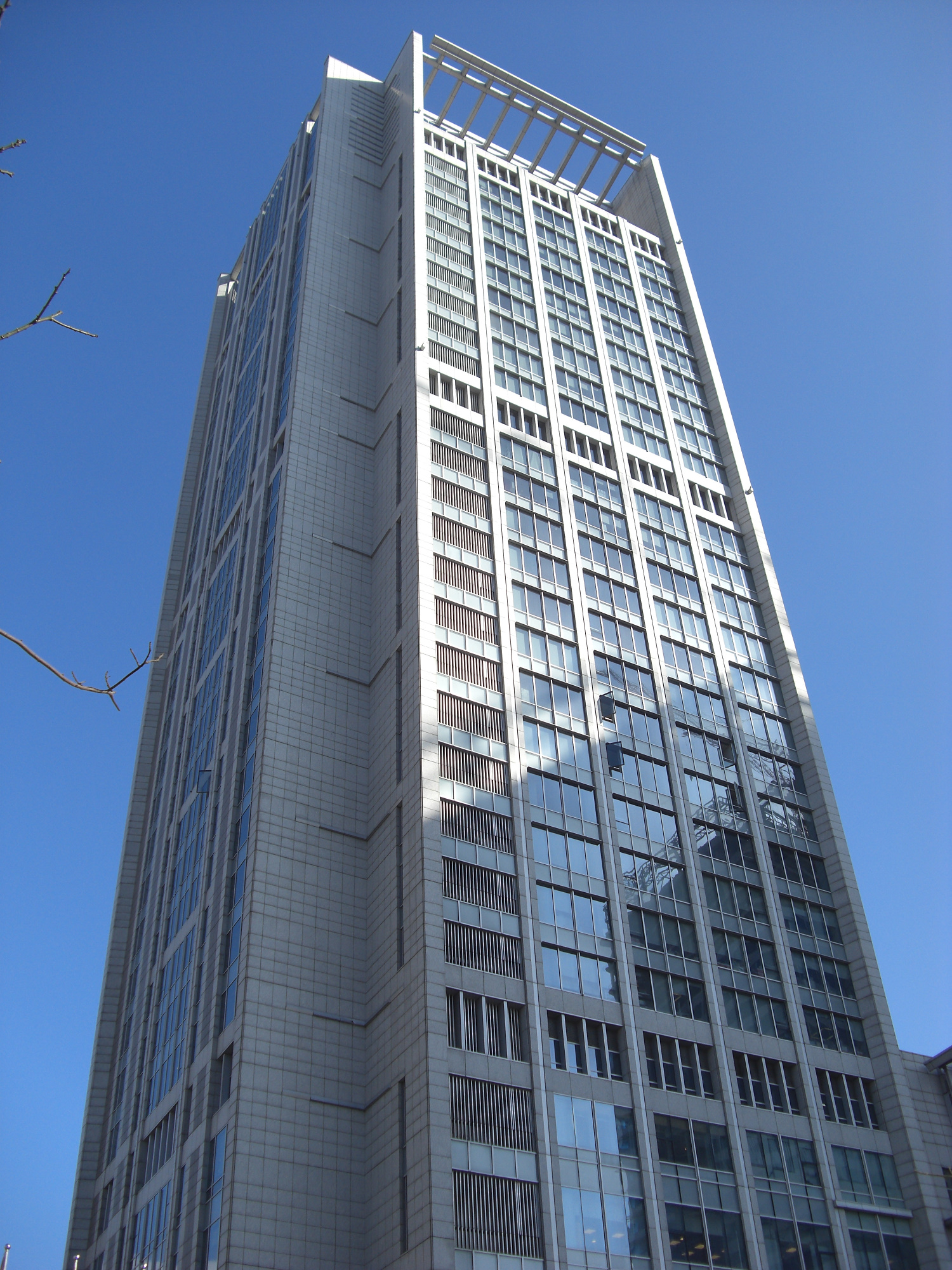
- Australian office in Taipei at the Uni-President International Tower
- Location: Taipei, Taiwan
- Address: 27-28th F, No. 9-11 Songgao Road
- Permanent representative: Robert Fergusson
- Website: Australian Office, Taipei

The Australian Office in Taipei (Chinese: 澳洲駐台辦事處) is the representative office of Australia in Taiwan, functioning as a de facto embassy in the absence of formal diplomatic relations. The office is headed by a Representative.

Its counterpart in Australia is the Taipei Economic and Cultural Office in Canberra.

== History ==
Before 1972, Australia recognised the Republic of China (Taiwan), and had an embassy in Taipei, opened in 1966. In 1972, diplomatic relations were ended following the decision of the government of Gough Whitlam to recognise the People's Republic of China.

An unofficial organisation known as the Australia-Free China Society, established an office in 1974 to provide services for Australians visiting Taiwan, headed by Lu Chen-kai, Secretary-General of the Sino-Australian Cultural and Economic Association in Taipei. In Australia, Douglas Darby, a member of the NSW Legislative Assembly, President of the Australia-Free China Society, represented Taiwan in Australia.

In 1981, The Australian Commerce and Industry Office under the Australian Chamber of Commerce was established in Taipei, which acted as an unofficial representative. The office adopted its present name in 2012 and is currently administered by the Australian Department of Foreign Affairs and Trade.

The Visa and Citizenship Office in Seoul, South Korea manages visa services for applicants in Taiwan.

== List of representatives ==
#	Officeholder	Image	Term start date	Term end date	Time in office	Notes
1	Bill Mattingly		1981	1990	8–9 years	
2	Rob O'Donovan		1990	1992	1–2 years	
3	Colin Heseltine		1992	1997	4–5 years	
4	Sam Gerovich		1997	2001	4 years	
5	Frances Adamson		2001	2005	4 years	
6	Steve Waters		2005	2008	2–3 years	
7	Alice Cawte		2008	2011	2–3 years	
8	Kevin Magee		2011	2014	2–3 years	
9	Catherine Raper		2014	2018	3–4 years	
10	Gary Cowan		2018	2021	2–3 years	
11	Jenny Bloomfield		2021	2023	1–2 years	
12	Robert Niel Fergusson		2023	Incumbent	2–3 years	

== See also ==
- Australia–Taiwan relations
