= The Gambia–Taiwan relations =

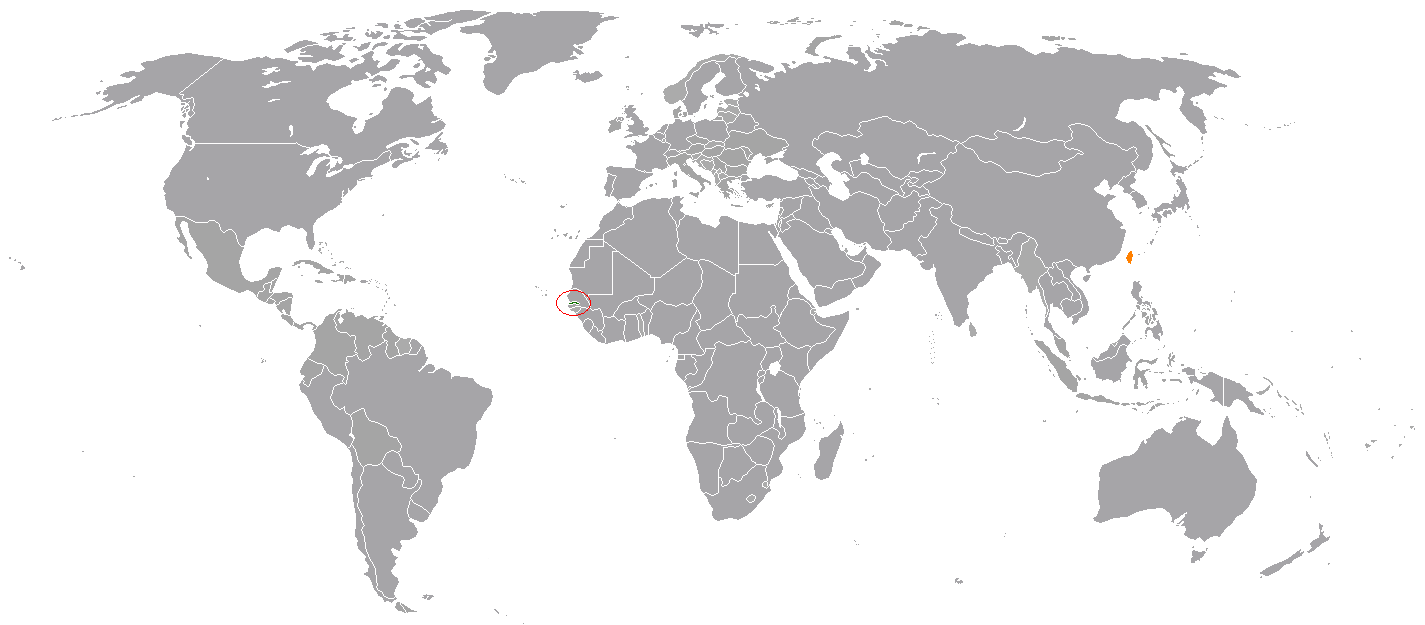
- Gambia: Taiwan

The Gambia–Taiwan relations refers to the historical relationship between The Gambia and Republic of China (ROC). Gambia officially recognized Taiwan in 1996 and the People's Republic of China ended recognition for Gambia. On 14 November 2013, Gambian President Yahya Jammeh announced the breaking of diplomatic ties with Taiwan. ROC President Ma Ying-jeou officially terminated ties with Gambia on 18 November 2013 as a response.

President of Taiwan (ROC), Ma Ying-jeou, visited The Gambia in April 2012.

== Aid ==
In December 2010, Taiwan donated $300,000 to aid The Gambia's health sector.

On 27 August 2013, the Taiwanese government donated a total sum of US$1,158,875.5 in order to provide support for two projects. The first sum of US$692,983.5 would be used to fulfill the requirements and the implementation of the phase three of the Old Police Line Quarters rehabilitation project. The remaining US$465,892 were assigned for scholarships and tuition fees for six Gambians students to study Aeronautical Engineering and maintenance skills at Spartan College of Aeronautics and Technology, USA.

== Ambassadors ==
=== ROC ambassadors to the Gambia ===
- Edgar Lin (August 2001 – December 2004)

== See also ==
- Foreign relations of Taiwan
- Foreign relations of The Gambia
