= Chen Chien-jen (born 1939) =

Taiwanese diplomat (1939–2025)

Chen Chien-jen MLY
- 程建人
- Official portrait, 1999

2nd Representative of Taiwan to the European Union and Belgium
- In office August 2004 – 3 July 2006
- President: Chen Shui-bian
- Preceded by: David Lee
- Succeeded by: Michael Kau

8th Representative of Taiwan to the United States
- In office 30 June 2000 – 20 May 2004
- President: Chen Shui-bian
- Deputy: Lee Ying-yuan; Shen Lyu-shun; Michael Tsai
- Preceded by: Stephen S.F. Chen
- Succeeded by: David Lee

14th Minister of Foreign Affairs
- In office 30 November 1999 – 20 May 2000
- Prime Minister: Vincent Siew
- Preceded by: Jason Hu
- Succeeded by: Tien Hung-mao

15th Minister of the Government Information Office
- In office 5 February 1998 – 30 November 1999
- Prime Minister: Vincent Siew
- Preceded by: David Lee
- Succeeded by: Chao Yi

Member of the Legislative Yuan
- In office 1 February 1993 – 31 January 1996
- Constituency: Party-list

Personal details
- Born: 11 August 1939 Jiading, Jiangsu, China
- Died: 26 September 2025 (aged 86)
- Party: Kuomintang
- Education: National Chengchi University (LLB, MA); University of Cambridge (LLB)

Chen Chien-jen (Chinese: 程建人; pinyin: Chéng Jiànrén; 11 August 1939 – 26 September 2025) was a Taiwanese diplomat and lawyer who served as Minister of Foreign Affairs from 1999 to 2000.

== Background ==
Chen was born in Jiangsu, China, on 11 August 1939. After moving to Taiwan in his childhood during the Great Retreat, Chen graduated from National Chengchi University in 1960 with a Bachelor of Laws (LL.B.) and earned a master's degree in international relations from the university in 1962. He then studied law in England, where he earned a second LL.B. in 1965 from the University of Cambridge in international law. In 1966, he was a fellow at the Complutense University of Madrid in Spain.

Chen died on 26 September 2025, at the age of 86.

== Political career ==
Chen served in the Legislative Yuan for one term from 1993 to 1996. He was then named the minister of the Government Information Office in 1998. The next year, he was appointed to lead the Ministry of Foreign Affairs. Chen planned to retire after stepping down at the end of President Lee Teng-hui's final term in 2000. However, Lee's successor Chen Shui-bian asked Chen Chien-jen to reconsider. Chen eventually chose to accept the post of representative to the United States. He postponed retirement again in 2004 to become the representative to the European Union and Belgium. Chen was succeeded by Michael Kau in July 2006.

During Hung Hsiu-chu's 2016 presidential campaign, Chen was one of her diplomatic advisers.
