= Tien Hung-mao =

Taiwanese diplomat and political scientist

- 田弘茂
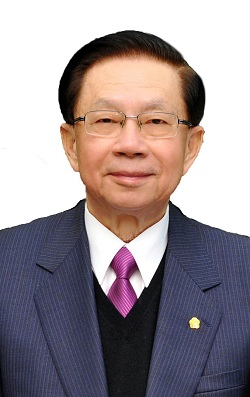

Chairman of the Straits Exchange Foundation
- In office 12 September 2016 – 27 March 2018
- Deputy: Chang Tien-chin; Ko Cheng-heng
- Preceded by: Lin Join-sane; Chen Ter-shing (acting)
- Succeeded by: Katharine Chang

ROC Representative for United Kingdom
- In office 2002–2004
- Preceded by: Tzen Wen-hua
- Succeeded by: Edgar Lin

Minister of Foreign Affairs
- In office 20 May 2000 – 1 February 2002
- Preceded by: Chen Chien-jen
- Succeeded by: Eugene Chien

Personal details
- Born: 7 November 1938 (age 87) Rokkō Village, Sobun District, Tainan Prefecture, Japanese Taiwan (modern-day Lioujia District, Tainan, Taiwan)
- Education: Tunghai University (BA); University of Wisconsin–Madison (MA, PhD)

Tien Hung-mao (Chinese: 田弘茂; pinyin: Tián Hóngmào; Wade–Giles: Tʻien^{2} Hung^{2}-mao^{4}; born 7 November 1938) is a Taiwanese diplomat and political scientist. He was the Minister of Foreign Affairs from 20 May 2000 until 1 February 2002.

== Education ==
Tien graduated from Tunghai University in 1961 with a bachelor's degree in English literature. He then went to the United States to pursue graduate studies at the University of Wisconsin–Madison, where he earned a Master of Arts (M.A.) in 1966 and a Ph.D. in political science in 1969. His doctoral dissertation was titled, "Government and Politics in Kuomintang China, 1927-1937".

== Career ==
Thereafter he was a university professor for more than twenty years, and naturalised as a U.S. citizen. After he moved back to Taiwan, Lee Teng-hui had asked him twice in the 1990s to serve in the Executive Yuan Council, but each time he refused; reportedly, the requirement that he renounce U.S. citizenship was a major barrier. However, Tien did serve as an advisor to Lee. He eventually accepted Chen Shui-bian's offer to become Minister of Foreign Affairs, and renounced his U.S. citizenship on 11 May, eight days before taking office. He later stated in an interview that he did not regret this step at all, because he "loved Taiwan". After his term ended, he took up a new post as the head of Taipei Representative Office in the U.K. He resigned the position in 2004, and later led the Institute of National Policy Research. In 2016, Tsai Ing-wen named Tien the chair of the Straits Exchange Foundation. He left the position in March 2018.

== Selected works ==
- Political development in China, 1927–1937. Doctoral dissertation. University of Wisconsin–Madison. 1969. OCLC 47888967.
- Government and politics in Kuomintang China, 1927–1937. Stanford University. 1972. ISBN 9780804708128. OCLC 554256.
- Mainland China, Taiwan, and U.S. policy. Cambridge, Massachusetts: Oelgeschlager, Gunn & Hain. 1983. OCLC 8689445.
- The great transition: political and social change in the Republic of China. Stanford, California: Hoover Institution Press. 1989. ISBN 9780817987817. OCLC 18715581.
