= Uni-President International Tower =

Office building in Taipei, Taiwan

Uni-President International Tower 統一國際大樓
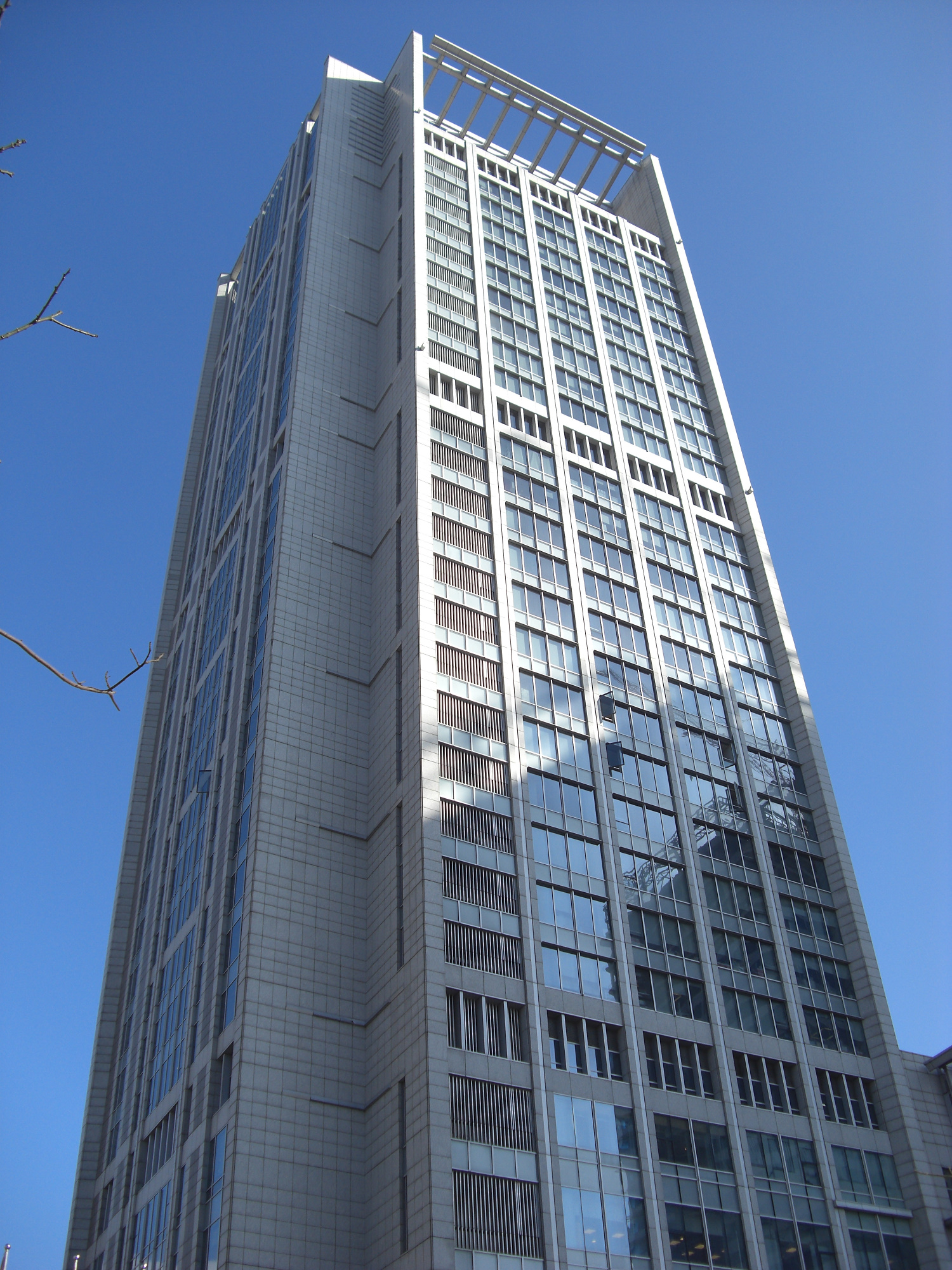
- Interactive map of the Uni-President International Tower 統一國際大樓 area

General information
- Status: Completed
- Type: Office building, Shopping mall
- Location: Xinyi, Taipei, Taiwan
- Coordinates: 25°2′23.31″N 121°33′54.7″E
- Construction started: Feb 20, 2002
- Completed: May 20, 2004

Height
- Roof: 154.0 Metre

Technical details
- Floor count: 30
- Floor area: 116,773.91m^{2}

Design and construction
- Architect: Paul Noritaka Tange

The Uni-President International Tower (Chinese: 統一國際大樓) is a skyscraper located in Xinyi District, Taipei, Taiwan. It is the fifth tallest in Xinyi Special District (after Taipei 101, Taipei Nan Shan Plaza, Cathay Landmark and Farglory Financial Center). The height of building is 154 m (505 ft), the floor area is 116,773.91 m^{2} (1,256,943.9 sq ft), and it comprises 30 floors above ground, as well as 7 basement levels. It houses the Australian Office in Taipei, British Office Taipei, and Hong Kong Economic, Trade and Cultural Office. The lower level shopping mall is operated by Eslite (Eslite Xinyi, Chinese: 誠品信義).

== See also ==
- List of tallest buildings in Taiwan
- Xinyi Planning District
