= Lin Cheng-yi (minister) =

Taiwanese politician

- 林正義

Deputy Minister of Mainland Affairs Council of the Republic of China
- Incumbent
- Assumed office 19 March 2018 Serving with Chang Tien-chin, Chiu Chui-cheng
- Minister: Chen Ming-tong
- In office 20 May 2016 – 26 February 2018 Serving with Chang Tien-chin, Chiu Chui-cheng
- Minister: Katharine Chang

Minister of Mainland Affairs Council of the Republic of China (acting)
- In office 26 February 2018 – 19 March 2018
- Deputy: Chang Tien-chin, Chiu Chui-cheng
- Preceded by: Katharine Chang
- Succeeded by: Chen Ming-tong

Personal details
- Education: National Chengchi University (BA, MA); University of Virginia (MA, PhD)

Lin Cheng-yi (Chinese: 林正義; pinyin: Lín Zhèngyì) is a Taiwanese politician. He was the deputy minister of the Mainland Affairs Council.

== Education ==
Lin obtained his bachelor's and master's degrees from National Chengchi University in 1978 and 1982, respectively, and earned a second master's degree and his Ph.D. from the University of Virginia in the United States in 1984 and 1987, respectively. His doctoral dissertation was titled, "China, the US, and the Security of Taiwan".

== See also ==
- Cross-Strait relations
