= Lin Cheng-yi (legislator) =

Taiwanese politician (born 1942)

Lin Cheng-yi (Chinese: 林政義; born 1942) is a Taiwanese politician.

Lin is a native of Tainan. At the suggestion of Kuo Tien-tao, Lin moved to Australia after graduating from the Taipei Institute of Technology. He earned a doctorate at the University of New South Wales, and subsequently joined the faculty and administration, later moving to the University of South Australia, where he spent the majority of his career. Between 2002 and 2005, Lin returned to Taiwan to represent overseas Chinese in the Legislative Yuan, as a member of the People First Party. At the end of his term, Lin resettled in Australia, and in 2014, was named president of the Nan Tien Institute, a school operated by the Nan Tien Temple.
