= Chen Ming-tong =

Taiwanese political scientist and politician

- 陳明通
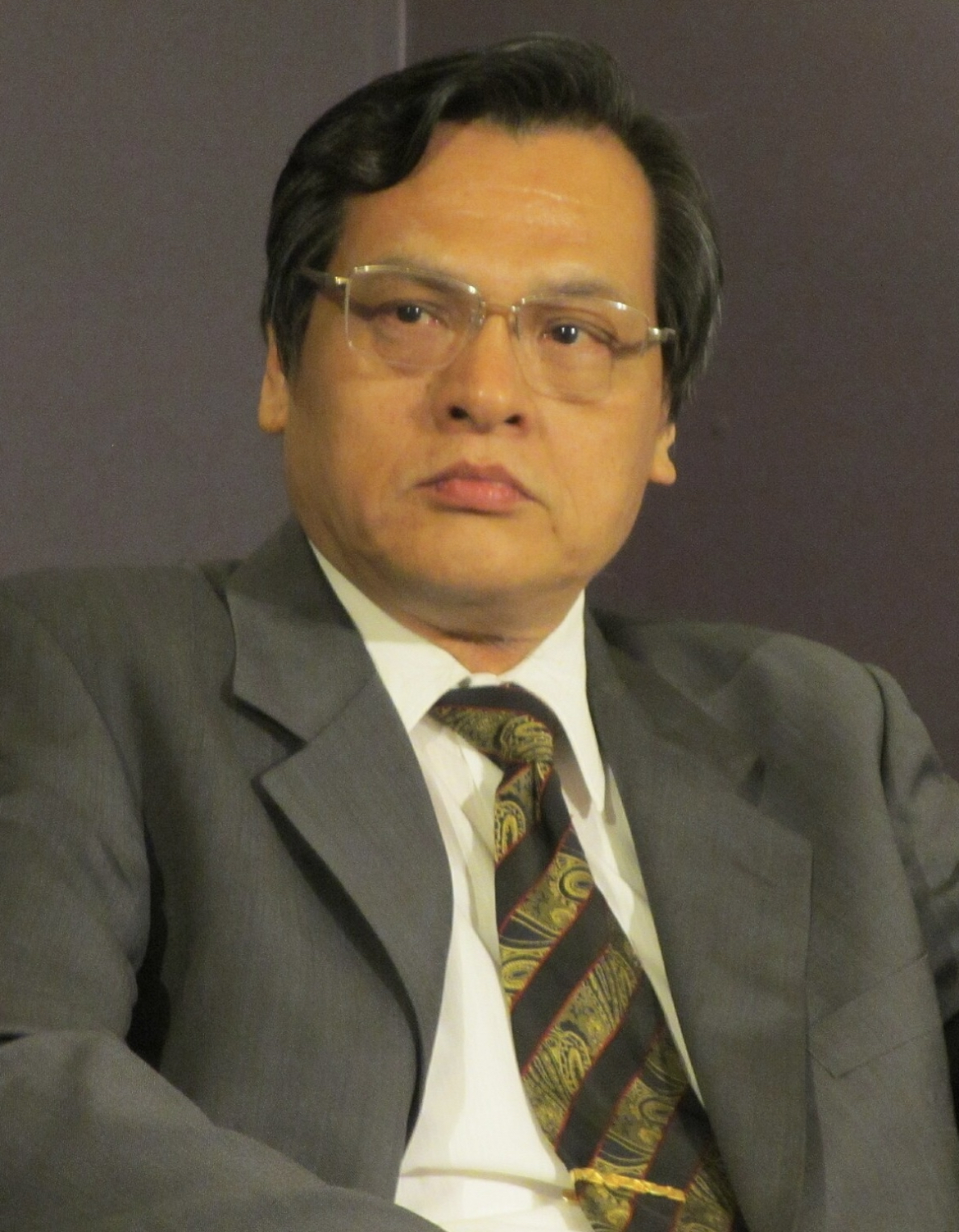
- Chen in 2014

19th Director-General of the National Security Bureau
- In office 23 February 2021 – 31 January 2023
- President: Tsai Ing-wen
- Preceded by: Chiu Kuo-cheng
- Succeeded by: Tsai Ming-yen

8th and 13th Minister of the Mainland Affairs Council
- In office 19 March 2018 – 22 February 2021
- Prime Minister: William Lai; Su Tseng-chang
- Deputy: Chiu Chui-cheng; Lee Li-chen
- Preceded by: Lin Cheng-yi (acting)
- Succeeded by: Chiu Tai-san
- In office 10 April 2007 – 20 May 2008
- Prime Minister: Su Tseng-chang; Chang Chun-hsiung
- Preceded by: Joseph Wu
- Succeeded by: Lai Shin-yuan

Deputy Minister of the Mainland Affairs Council
- In office 20 May 2000 – 19 May 2004
- Minister: Tsai Ing-wen

Personal details
- Born: 25 November 1955 (age 70) Taichung County, Taiwan
- Party: Democratic Progressive Party
- Education: National Taiwan University (BA, MA, PhD)

Chen Ming-tong (Chinese: 陳明通; pinyin: Chén Míngtōng; born 25 November 1955) is a Taiwanese political scientist and politician who served as the director-general of the National Security Bureau from 2021 to 2023 and the minister of the Mainland Affairs Council from 2018 to 2021 and 2007 to 2008.

== Education ==
After graduating from Taichung Municipal Taichung Second Senior High School, Chen attended National Taiwan University, where he earned his bachelor's degree in political science in 1979, his master's degree in political science in 1981, and then his Ph.D. in political science in 1991. His doctoral dissertation was titled, "The Movement of Local Political Elites in Taiwan under Authoritarian Regime (1945-1986)" (Chinese: 威權政體下臺灣地方政治菁英的流動（1945－1986）—省參議員流動的分析).

== Academic career ==
Chen worked as a researcher in the Research, Development and Evaluation Commission of the Taipei City Government in 1983-1984. After finishing his doctoral degree, he worked as associate professor followed by professor at the Graduate Institute of National Development of NTU from 1992 to 2000.

He was a thesis adviser to several politicians affiliated with the Democratic Progressive Party, including Chiu Chih-wei, Kao Chia-yu, Lin Chih-chien, Pan Men-an, Cheng Wen-tsan and Shen Fa-hui.

In 2022, several master theses he advised were pointed out for plagiarism, and his students Lin Chih-chien and Cheng Wen-tsan's master degrees were been canceled by National Taiwan University. Then he was fired by the university. In 2024, he published a book with Puma Shen, claiming that the "theses event" was a political persecution influenced by mainland China. However, the university declared that Lin and Cheng had accepted the cancellation of their degrees and Chen was required to apologize to the public as the advisor of the graduates.

== Political career ==
He led the Mainland Affairs Council (MAC) between 2007 and 2008, then returned to NTU. In 2018, he succeeded Katharine Chang as MAC minister.

== National Security Bureau ==
In 2022, he publicly claimed on the basis of intelligence that China was not going to invade Taiwan within the next several years while Tsai Ing-wen remained in office and that the Russian invasion of Ukraine had caused the mainland to re-evaluate their military plans regarding Taiwan. He also claimed that Taiwan had some knowledge of what the makeup of the Politburo Standing Committee of the Chinese Communist Party was going to be after the 20th National Congress of the Chinese Communist Party to be held later in 2022.

His public revelation of this information was criticized by former army Major General Yu Beichen, he alleged that revealing such specific information put intelligence gathering in the mainland at risk.
