= Chiu Chui-cheng =

Taiwanese political scientist

- 邱垂正
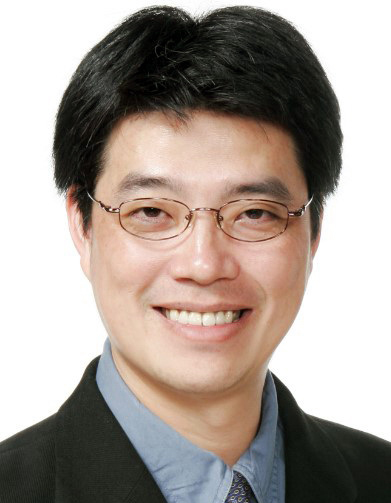
- Official portrait, 2024

14th Minister of Mainland Affairs Council
- Incumbent
- Assumed office 20 May 2024
- Prime Minister: Cho Jung-tai
- Preceded by: Chiu Tai-san

Political Deputy Minister and Spokesperson of the Mainland Affairs Council
- In office 20 May 2016 – 30 January 2023 Serving with Lee Li-chen and Wu Mei-hung
- Minister: Katharine Chang; Lin Cheng-yi (acting); Chen Ming-tong

Personal details
- Born: December 10, 1965 (age 60)
- Party: Democratic Progressive Party
- Education: Soochow University (BA); National Taiwan University (MA); National Taiwan Normal University (PhD)

Chiu Chui-cheng (Chinese: 邱垂正; pinyin: Qiū Chuízhèng; Tâi-lô: Khu Sûi-tsìng; born December 10, 1965) is a Taiwanese political scientist who has been the minister of the Mainland Affairs Council since 2024. He previously served as the political deputy minister and spokesperson for the Mainland Affairs Council from 2016 to 2023.

== Early life and education ==
Chiu was born on December 10, 1965. He graduated from Soochow University with a bachelor's degree in political science in 1992, and earned a master's degree in economics from National Taiwan University in 1999. He then earned his Ph.D. in political science from National Taiwan Normal University in 2007. His doctoral dissertation was titled, "The Construction of a Peaceful Integration Model Across the Taiwan Strait" (Chinese: 台海兩岸和平整合模式之建構).

== Early career ==
Prior to his appointment as Deputy Minister, Chiu was a professor of the Department of International and Mainland China Affairs of National Quemoy University.

== See also ==
- Cross-Strait relations
