= Chiu Tai-san =

Taiwanese lawyer and politician

Chiu Tai-san MLY
- 邱太三

13th Minister of Mainland Affairs Council
- In office 23 February 2021 – 20 May 2024
- Prime Minister: Su Tseng-chang; Chen Chien-jen
- Preceded by: Chen Ming-tong
- Succeeded by: Chiu Chui-cheng

Chief Advisor of the National Security Council
- In office 16 July 2018 – 2 April 2019
- President: Tsai Ing-wen
- Secretary General: Wellington Koo

23rd Minister of Justice
- In office 20 May 2016 – 15 July 2018
- Prime Minister: Lin Chuan; William Lai
- Preceded by: Luo Ying-shay
- Succeeded by: Tsai Ching-hsiang

1st Deputy Mayor of Taoyuan
- In office 25 December 2014 – March 2016
- Mayor: Cheng Wen-tsan
- Preceded by: Position established (Note: Kao Yang-sheng as the deputy magistrate of Taoyuan County.)
- Succeeded by: You Chien-hua

Deputy Mayor of Kaohsiung
- In office 25 December 2006 – 1 August 2008
- Mayor: Chen Chu

Deputy Minister of Mainland Affairs Council
- In office 20 May 2004 – 1 April 2005
- Minister: Joseph Wu
- Succeeded by: Michael You

Member of the Legislative Yuan
- In office 1 February 1999 – 19 May 2004
- Constituency: Taichung County

Personal details
- Born: 30 August 1956 (age 69) Dajia, Taichung County, Taiwan (now Taichung)
- Party: Democratic Progressive Party
- Spouse: Sung Fu-mei (宋富美)
- Education: National Taiwan University (LLB, LLM, PhD)
- Profession: Lawyer

Chiu Tai-san (Chinese: 邱太三; pinyin: Qiū Tàisān; born 30 August 1956) is a Taiwanese lawyer and politician. He was a member of the Legislative Yuan from 1999 to 2004. He then served as the vice minister of the Mainland Affairs Council, and later as deputy mayor of Kaohsiung City under Chen Chu. After leaving politics for a teaching position, Chiu was named the deputy mayor of Taoyuan City under Cheng Wen-tsan in 2014. He resigned in 2016, and was appointed the minister of Justice later that year. Chiu stepped down from the justice ministry in 2018, and served on the National Security Council until 2019. In 2021, Chiu was appointed minister of the Mainland Affairs Council.

== Education ==
After graduating from Taichung Municipal Taichung First Senior High School, Chiu studied law at National Taiwan University, where he earned a Bachelor of Laws (LL.B.), a Master of Laws (LL.M.), and, in 2009, his Ph.D. in law. His doctoral dissertation, completed under jurists Weng Yueh-sheng and Chiu Rong-jeo, was titled, "The legislative transformation of Taiwan's criminal justice and human rights system after democratization" (Chinese: 臺灣政治民主化下刑事人權法制之立法變遷).

== Early career ==
After graduating from law school, Chiu worked as a prosecutor for the district courts of Tainan and Hsinchiu. He later was a visiting scholar at Harvard University.

== Political career ==
A member of the Democratic Progressive Party's New Tide faction, Chiu began his political career as a secretary for Taichung County Magistrate Liao Yung-lai. He was elected to the Legislative Yuan as a representative of Taichung County in the 1998 elections. Reelected in 2001, Chiu stepped down in the middle of his term on 19 May 2004 to become the first vice chairman of the Mainland Affairs Council. He left the MAC in March 2005 and declared his intention to run for the Taichung County magistracy. Chiu was replaced at the MAC by Michael You. Chiu was challenged in a party primary by National Assemblyman Lin Feng-hsi. Chiu defeated Lin in first round of the primary, which consisted of telephone surveys run by three separate different companies. Lin claimed that one of the three polls had been subject to a computer hardware error and should be redone. Chiu was eventually reconfirmed as the DPP candidate, and lost the December election to incumbent Huang Chung-sheng. Following the defeat, Chiu was named a deputy mayor of Kaohsiung shortly before Chen Chu took office as mayor in December 2006. After leaving the Kaohsiung City Government, Chiu taught at Asia University, eventually leading its financial and economic law department. He launched another bid for the Taichung County magistracy in 2010, and again lost to Huang Chung-sheng. The Democratic Progressive Party considered nominating him as a candidate for a legislative seat in the 2012 elections. However, Chiu did not return to public service until 2014, when Cheng Wen-tsan appointed him deputy mayor of Taoyuan.

In March 2016, Chiu resigned his Taoyuan City Government position to serve as a policy advisor to president-elect Tsai Ing-wen. The next month, Chiu was named the Minister of Justice in Lin Chuan's incoming cabinet. He took office on 20 May 2016. Shortly after assuming his post as Minister of Justice, Chiu stated that Taiwan would maintain the death penalty. Chiu supported legislator Tsai Yi-yu's August 2016 proposal to eliminate the Special Investigation Division. Other attempts at reform include a victims' protection initiative and setting up a legal research department to immediately send contentious court cases directly to the Supreme Court. In February 2017, Chiu announced that the general public would be able to participate in committees convened to review the work of prosecutors. He left office in July 2018, and was named to the National Security Council. Chiu resigned from the National Security Council on 2 April 2019, shortly after the Taiwan High Court Prosecutors' Office charged him with influence peddling. In December 2019, Chiu was appointed to lead a Democratic Progressive Party task force convened to combat electoral fraud during the January 2020 elections. Chiu later returned to the National Security Council as a consultant, serving until February 2021, when he was named leader of the Mainland Affairs Council. Chiu formally succeeded Chen Ming-tong as minister of the Mainland Affairs Council on 23 February 2021.

== Personal ==
Chu is married to jurist Sung Fu-mei.

== Honors ==
- 2024 Order of Brilliant Star with Grand Cordon
