= Mainland Affairs Council =

Taiwanese government agency

Coordinates: 25°02′33″N 121°31′11″E

- 大陸委員會

Agency overview
- Formed: August 1988 (as Inter-Agency Mainland Affairs Committee); 28 January 1991 (as MAC)
- Jurisdiction: Republic of China
- Headquarters: Zhongzheng, Taipei, Taiwan
- Ministers responsible: Chiu Chui-cheng, Minister; Liang Wen-jie, Shen You-zhong, Lee Li-chen, Deputy Ministers
- Parent agency: Executive Yuan
- Child agency: Straits Exchange Foundation
- Website: www.mac.gov.tw

Chinese name
- Traditional Chinese: 大陸委員會
- Simplified Chinese: 大陆委员会
- Literal meaning: Mainland Committee
Transcriptions
Standard Mandarin
- Hanyu Pinyin: Dàlù Wěiyuánhuì
Hakka
- Pha̍k-fa-sṳ: Thai-liu̍k Vî-yèn-fi
Southern Min
- Hokkien POJ: Tāi-lio̍k Úi-oân-hōe
- Tâi-lô: Tāi-lio̍k Úi-uân-hūe

The Mainland Affairs Council (MAC) is a cabinet-level administrative agency under the Executive Yuan of the Republic of China (Taiwan). The MAC is responsible for the planning, development, and implementation of the cross-strait relations policy which targets mainland China, Hong Kong and Macau.

The MAC's counterpart body in the People's Republic of China is the Taiwan Affairs Office. Both states officially claim each other's territory, though both sides control only part of the claimed territory. The affairs related to the PRC in mainland China is dealt by the MAC, instead of the Ministry of Foreign Affairs.

The council plays an important role in setting policy and development of cross-strait relations and advising the central government. It is administered by a cabinet level Minister. The current Minister is Chiu Tai-san. The agency funds and indirectly administers the Straits Exchange Foundation which directly interacts with agencies from the PRC.

== History ==
The government of ROC does not recognize the legitimacy and sovereignty of PRC since its establishment in 1949, and heated armed conflicts went on between both parties. The Republic of China controls only Taiwan, Penghu, and some other islands, and therefore is usually known as "Taiwan", sometimes referred to as the "Free Area" in the Republic of China by the Constitution of the Republic of China. The People's Republic of China controls mainland China as well as Hong Kong, Macau, and other islands, and is therefore usually known as "China". As the relation between the two sides of the Taiwan Strait cooled down, ROC government allowed family-related visits to mainland China in November 1987. The Executive Yuan established the Inter-Agency Mainland Affairs Committee in August 1988 as a taskforce to handle mainland-related affairs among the authorities. In April 1990, the ROC government drafted the Organization Act for the Mainland Affairs Council to strengthen mainland China policy making and to enhance policy making efficiency. The third reading of the act was passed by the Legislative Yuan on 18 January 1991. On 28 January 1991, the act was promulgated by President Lee Teng-hui thus officially authorized the Mainland Affairs Council to be the agency for the overall planning and handling of affairs towards mainland China.

In 2017, some of the responsibilities of the Mongolian and Tibetan Affairs Commission (MTAC) were absorbed into the MAC's Department of Hong Kong and Macao Affairs, creating the expanded Department of Hong Kong, Macao, Inner Mongolia, and Tibet Affairs.

As cross-strait relations worsened again in the early 2020s, the MAC banned Taiwanese citizens from working at Confucius Institutes, the Association for Relations Across the Taiwan Straits (ARATS), the All-China Youth Federation, and the All-China Federation of Taiwan Compatriots in 2024 out of national security concerns. In January 2025, the MAC revoked the operating license of The Strait Herald due to its united front work on the island.

== Organizational structure ==
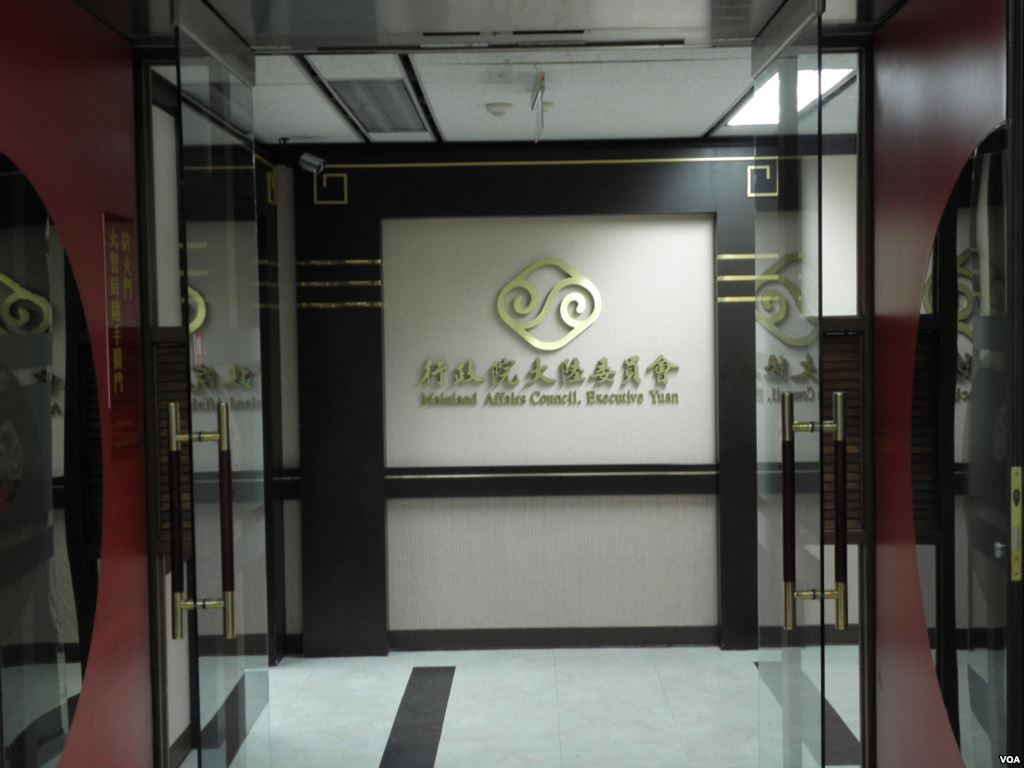
Mainland Affairs Council office

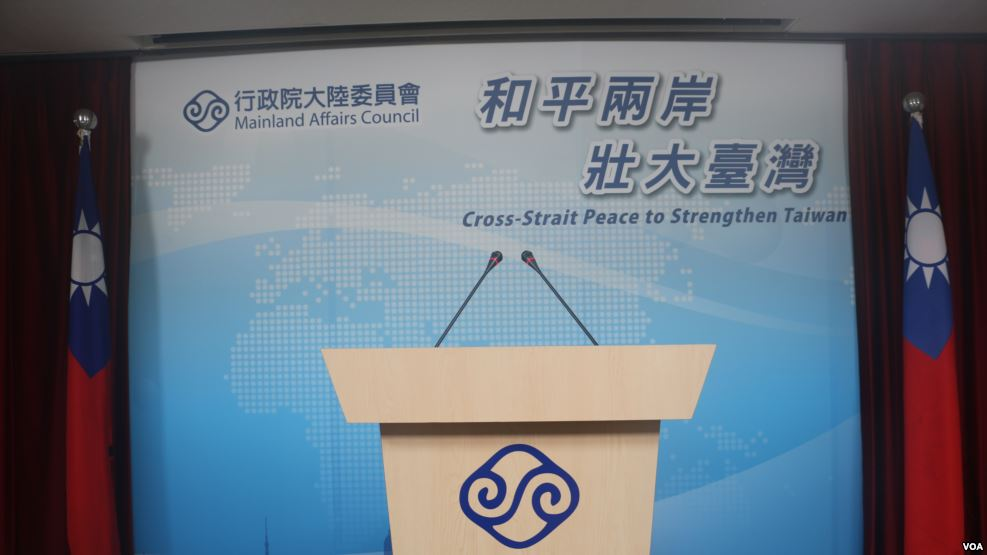
Mainland Affairs Council press conference lectern

The agency is organized in the following departments:

=== Internal departments ===
- Department of Policy Planning
- Department of Cultural and Educational Affairs
- Department of Economic Affairs
- Department of Legal Affairs
- Department of Hong Kong, Macao, Inner Mongolia, and Tibet Affairs
- Department of Information and Liaison

=== Offices ===
- Secretariat
- Personnel Office
- Accounting Office
- Civil Servant Ethics Office
- Information Management

=== Others ===
- Office of Hong Kong Affairs
- Office of Macao Affairs

== List of MAC heads ==
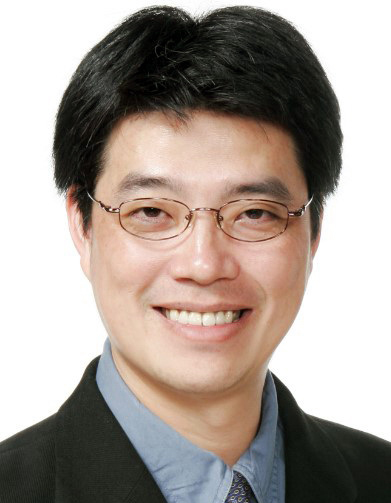
Chiu Chui-cheng, current Minister of MAC.

Non-partisan/ unknown Kuomintang (Nationalist) Democratic Progressive Party Taiwan Solidarity Union

No.	Name	Term of Office		Days	Political Party	Premier
1	Shih Chi-yang 施啟揚	7 February 1991	31 May 1991	113	Kuomintang	Hau Pei-tsun
2	Huang Kun-huei 黃昆輝	1 June 1991	14 December 1994	1292	Kuomintang	Hau Pei-tsun; Lien Chan
3	Vincent Siew 蕭萬長	15 December 1994	3 December 1995	353	Kuomintang	Lien Chan
—	Kao Koong-lian 高孔廉	3 December 1995	27 February 1996	86	Kuomintang	Lien Chan
4	Chang King-yuh 張京育	28 February 1996	31 January 1999	1068	Kuomintang	Lien Chan; Vincent Siew
5	Su Chi 蘇起	1 February 1999	19 May 2000	473	Kuomintang	Vincent Siew
6	Tsai Ing-wen 蔡英文	20 May 2000	19 May 2004	1460	Independent	Tang Fei; Chang Chun-hsiung I Yu Shyi-kun
7	Joseph Wu 吳釗燮	20 May 2004	10 April 2007	1055	Democratic Progressive Party	Yu Shyi-kun; Frank Hsieh; Su Tseng-chang I
8	Chen Ming-tong 陳明通	10 April 2007	19 May 2008	405	Democratic Progressive Party	Su Tseng-chang I Chang Chun-hsiung II
9	Lai Shin-yuan 賴幸媛	20 May 2008	28 September 2012	1592	Taiwan Solidarity Union	Liu Chao-shiuan; Wu Den-yih; Sean Chen
10	Wang Yu-chi 王郁琦	28 September 2012	16 February 2015	871	Kuomintang	Sean Chen; Jiang Yi-huah; Mao Chi-kuo
11	Andrew Hsia 夏立言	16 February 2015	19 May 2016	458	Kuomintang	Mao Chi-kuo; Chang San-cheng
12	Katharine Chang 張小月	20 May 2016	26 February 2018	647	Independent	Lin Chuan; William Lai
—	Lin Cheng-yi as acting 林正義	26 February 2018	19 March 2018	21	Independent	William Lai
(8)	Chen Ming-tong 陳明通	19 March 2018	23 February 2021	1072	Democratic Progressive Party	William Lai; Su Tseng-chang II
13	Chiu Tai-san 邱太三	23 February 2021	20 May 2024	1182	Democratic Progressive Party	Su Tseng-chang II; Chen Chien-jen
14	Chiu Chui-cheng 邱垂正	20 May 2024	Incumbent	810	Democratic Progressive Party	Cho Jung-tai

== See also ==
- Taiwan Affairs Office — counterpart body in China
- National Unification Council
- Constitutional and Mainland Affairs Bureau
- Committee for the Peaceful Reunification of the Fatherland — similar organization in North Korea
- Ministry of Unification — similar organization in South Korea
- Minister of Intra-German Relations — similar organization in West Germany
- State Ministry for Reconciliation and Civic Equality of Georgia — similar organization in Georgia
- Ministry of Reintegration of Temporarily Occupied Territories — similar organization in Ukraine
