= Netherlands–Taiwan relations =

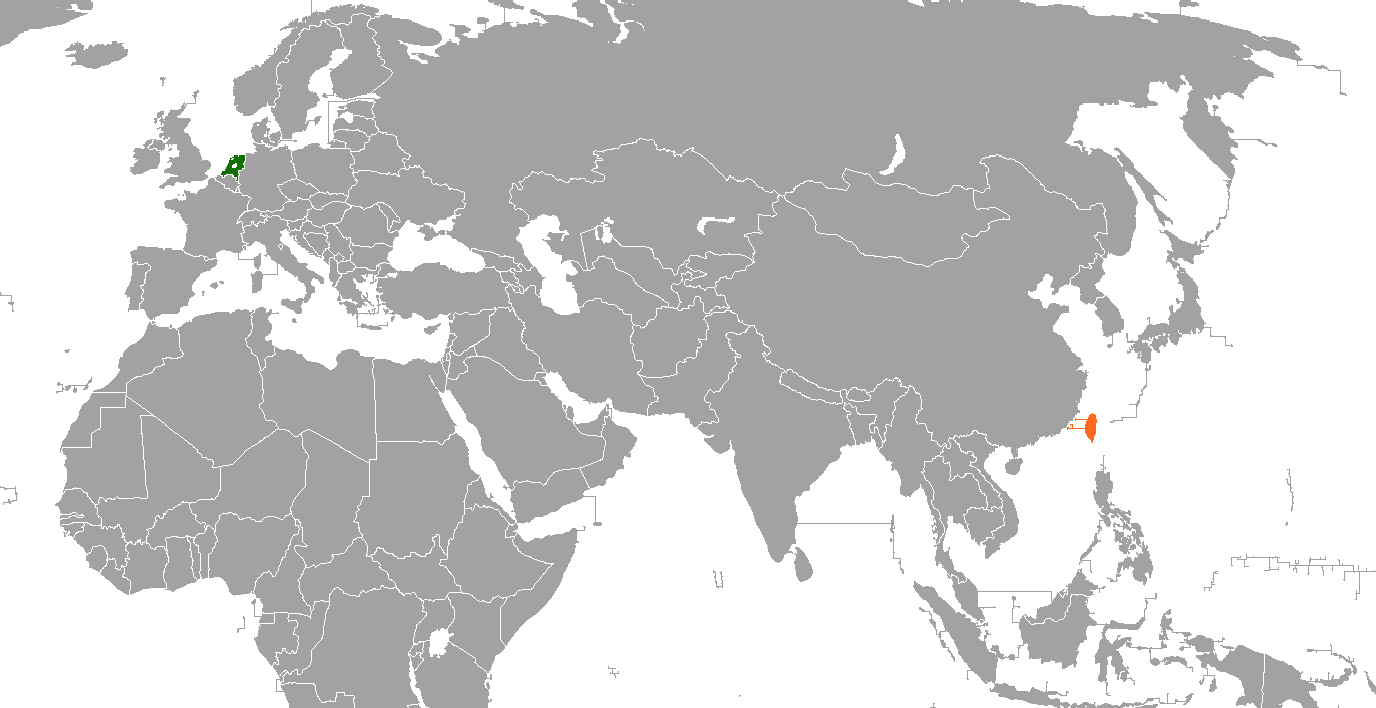
- Netherlands: Taiwan

Diplomatic mission
- Netherlands Office Taipei: Taipei Representative Office in the Netherlands

Envoy
- Representative Guido Jules Leopold Tielman: Representative Chen, Hsing Hsing

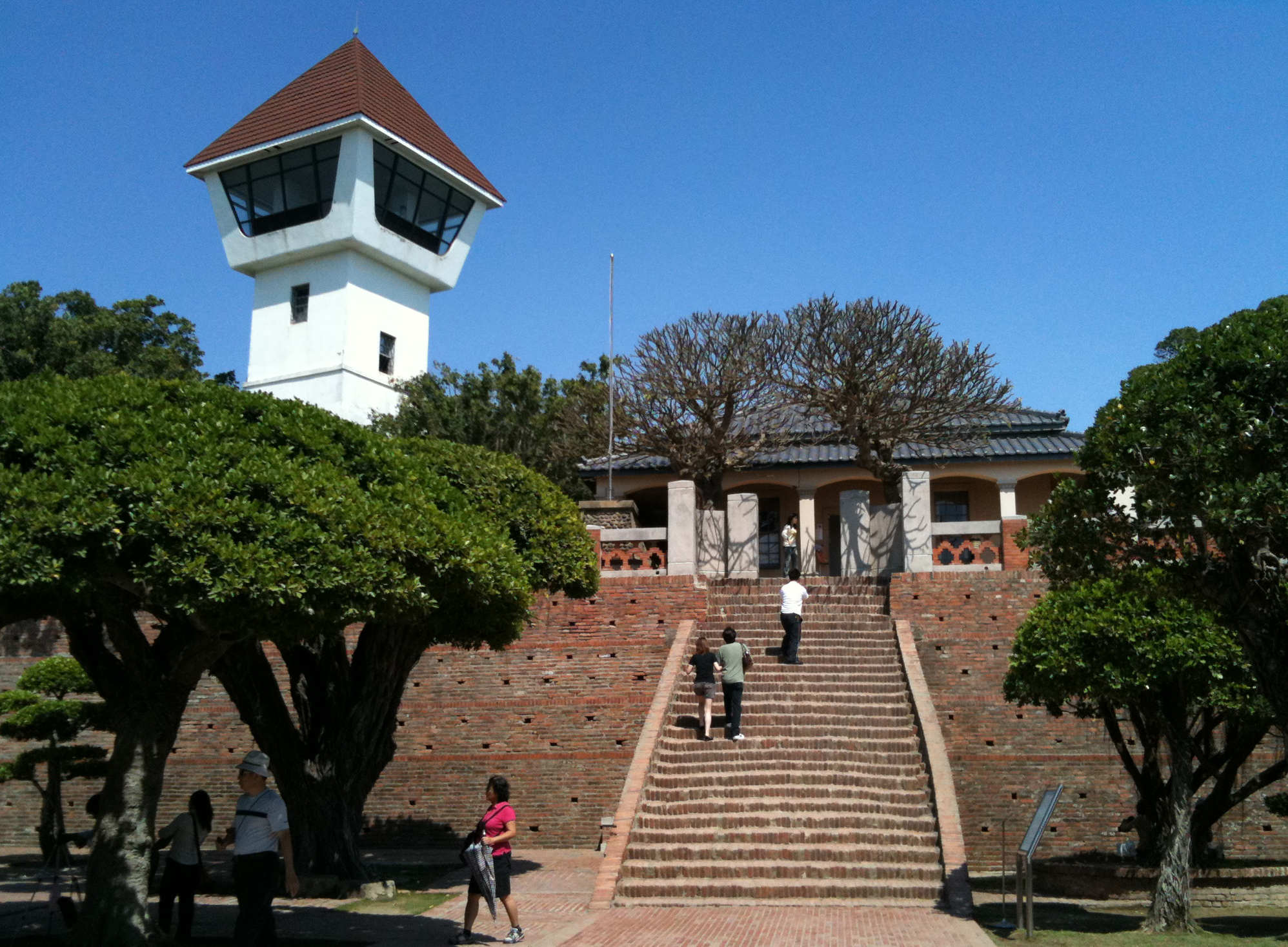
Fort Zeelandia, which was built by Dutch East India Company in 17th century.

Netherlands–Taiwan relations go back to the 1600s when the Dutch East India Company set up a colony on Taiwan.

== Overview ==
Taiwan's interests in the Netherlands are represented by the Taipei Representative Office in the Netherlands while Dutch interests in Taiwan are represented by the Netherlands Office, Taipei.

== History ==
From 1624 to 1662 and 1664 to 1668 the Dutch East India Company operated a colony on Taiwan. It was one of their most profitable colonies with 26% of the company's profits coming from their Taiwan operations in 1664. The Dutch East India Company were forced from their holdings by Koxinga and indigenous groups.

On October 6, 1913, the Netherlands recognized the Republic of China and established the Legation of Republic of China in The Hague, the administrative capital, and Legation of the Kingdom of the Netherlands in Peking. On December 19, 1928, as the Northern Expedition of the National Revolutionary Army was coming to an end, the Netherlands recognized the National Government of the Republic of China. On February 15, 1943, diplomatic relations at the ambassadorial level were established. The two legations were upgraded to embassies and ambassadors were sent to each other. In June 1947, the Netherlands Embassy moved to the capital Nanking. On March 27, 1950, the Netherlands severed diplomatic relations with the Republic of China and recognized the People's Republic of China.

In the 1980s Taiwan ordered two submarines from a Dutch shipyard which were delivered despite tremendous Chinese pressure. China accused the Netherlands of colluding with US President Ronald Reagan and downgraded relations with the Netherlands as "punishment" and threatened to do the same to the US.

To "punish" the Netherlands for delivering the submarines China downgraded diplomatic relations. In 1984 the Netherlands agreed not to export additional military goods in order to restore relations.

In 2001 the Netherlands and Taiwan signed a double-taxation treaty.

In 2020 the Netherlands changed the name of their representative office in Taiwan from "Netherlands Trade and Investment" to "Netherlands Office Taipei." This change was meant to reflect the actual scope of Netherlands–Taiwan relations beyond simply trade and investment. China reacted negatively to the change with the authorities threatening to cut off sales of medical supplies to the Netherlands during the COVID-19 pandemic.

In 2020 the Netherlands House of Representatives passed a motion supporting Taiwan's participation in international organizations.

On September 12, 2024, the Netherlands House of Representatives passed a motion, pointing out that UN Resolution 2758 did not determine that China has sovereignty over Taiwan, nor did it exclude Taiwan from participating in the United Nations or other international organizations, and believed that China distorted the resolution and blocked Taiwan's international participation. It reiterated that Taiwan's participation in international organizations such as the International Civil Aviation Organization (ICAO) and the World Health Organization (WHO) is in the interests of the Netherlands. The House of Representatives passed a similar resolution in September 2025.

=== Foreign investment ===
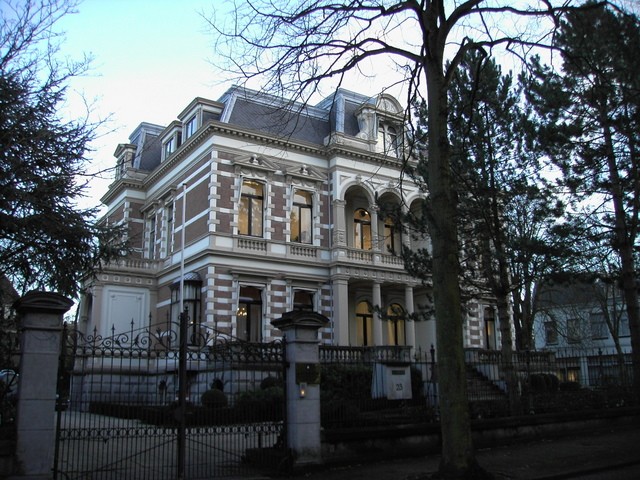
Taipei Representative Office in The Hague

The Dutch are considered to be Taiwan's first foreign investors due to their investments during the colonial period. In the modern era the Netherlands is Taiwan's largest source of foreign direct investment (FDI). Dutch electronics company ASML has significant investments in Taiwan and their long-term partnership with TSMC has allowed both of them to move to the head of their field. The Dutch electronics giant Philips was the largest initial investor in TSMC. Taiwanese FDI flows into the Netherlands are also significant.

== See also ==
- Foreign relations of Netherlands
- Foreign relations of Taiwan
- Netherlands Office Taipei
- Taipei Representative Office in the Netherlands
