= Cathay Financial Center =

Skyscraper office building in Xinyi District, Taipei, Taiwan

Cathay Financial Center 國泰金融中心
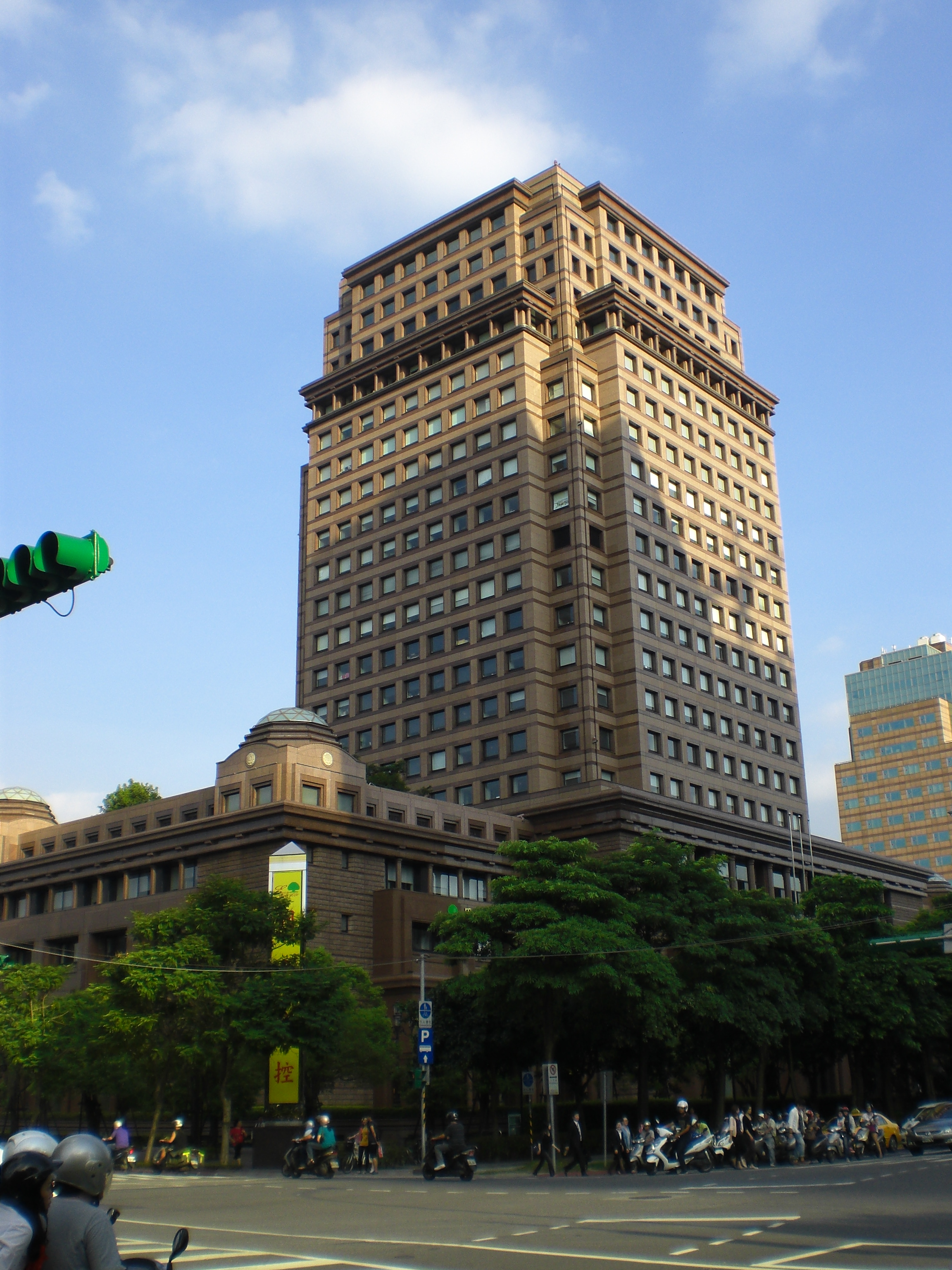
- Interactive map of the Cathay Financial Center 國泰金融中心 area

General information
- Status: Completed
- Type: Office building
- Classification: Office
- Location: No. 9, Songren Road, Xinyi District, Taipei, Taiwan
- Coordinates: 25.039631943867754°N 121.5691454277412°E
- Completed: 2002

Height
- Roof: 105 m (344 ft)

Technical details
- Floor count: 26

Design and construction
- Architect: Tokutoshi Torii

The Cathay Financial Center (Chinese: 國泰金融中心) is a 26-story, 105 metres (344 ft) skyscraper office building designed by Japanese architect Tokutoshi Torii and completed in 2002 in Xinyi District, Taipei, Taiwan. The building houses the corporate headquarters of Cathay Financial Holding.

In 2017, Cathay Financial Center was awarded the Leadership in Energy and Environmental Design (LEED) EBOM Gold Certification for Green Buildings. It is the first environmentally-friendly building in the existing buildings category for the life insurance industry in Taiwan.

== See also ==
- List of tallest buildings in Taiwan
- List of tallest buildings in Taipei
- Xinyi Special District
- Farglory International Center
- Cathay Landmark
