= List of diplomatic missions in Taiwan =

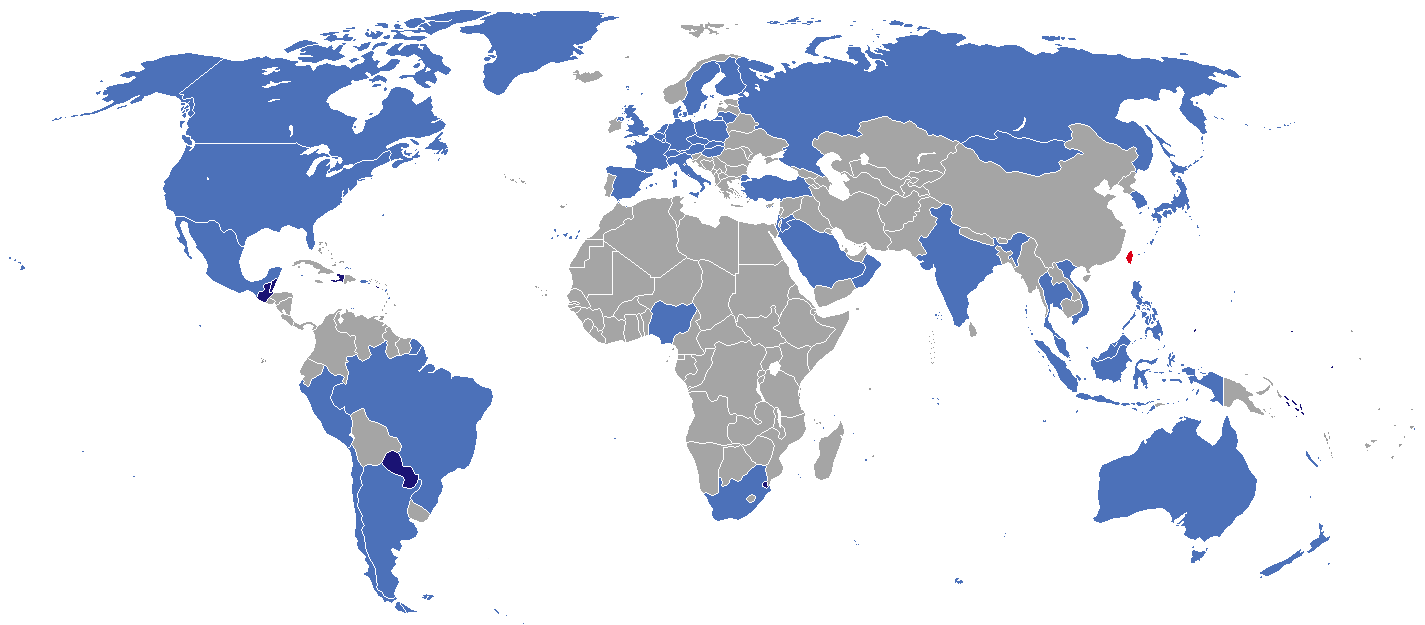
Map of diplomatic missions in Taiwan Taiwan (Republic of China) Countries with embassies in Taiwan Countries with Representative and Trade offices in Taiwan

The diplomatic missions in Taiwan include embassies; trade and cultural missions include representative offices. Due to the special political status and One-China policy, Taiwan is only recognized by twelve countries, all of whom have embassies in Taipei (some of the embassies of these countries also have jurisdiction over other countries). Except for the Holy See, the embassies of the other 11 countries are located in the Diplomatic Quarter. In addition, approximately 50 countries, which do not have diplomatic relations with the Republic of China, have established representative offices and other offices in Taiwan, which have a wide array of titles. These institutions have the same functions as embassies or consulates, that is, they provide diplomatic services such as visa processing and passport renewal. The personnel stationed there are usually diplomats or government-authorized personnel. During the Japanese colonial period, a number of countries including the Republic of China and the United States of America maintained consulates in Taipei.

== Embassies ==
in Taipei

1. Belize
2. Eswatini
3. Guatemala
4. Haiti
5. Holy See
6. Marshall Islands
7. Palau
8. Paraguay
9. Saint Kitts and Nevis
10. Saint Lucia
11. Saint Vincent and the Grenadines
12. Tuvalu

== Representative Offices ==
Except in European Union, Argentina, Japan, Somaliland, Philippines (officially known as 'Manila Economic and Cultural Office' and also known as 'Philippine Representative Office in Taiwan'), and the United States, all foreign missions use the capital city "Taipei" and refrain from using the name "Taiwan" or the "Republic of China".

in Taipei

1. Argentina (Argentina Trade and Cultural Office in Taiwan)
2. Australia (Australian Office, Taipei)
3. Austria (Austrian Office, Taipei)
4. Belgium (Belgian Office, Taipei)
5. Brazil (Commercial Office of Brazil to Taipei)
6. Brunei (Brunei Darussalam Trade and Tourism Office in Taipei)
7. Canada (Canadian Trade Office in Taipei)
8. Chile (Chilean Trade Office in Taipei)
9. Czech Republic (Czech Economic and Cultural Office in Taipei)
10. Denmark (Trade Council of Denmark, Taipei)
11. European Union (European Economic and Trade Office in Taiwan)
12. Finland (Finland Trade Center in Taiwan)
13. France (French Office in Taipei)
14. Germany (German Institute, Taipei)
15. Hungary (Hungarian Trade Office, Taipei)
16. India (India Taipei Association)
17. Indonesia (Indonesian Economic and Trade Office to Taipei)
18. Israel (Israel Economic and Cultural Office in Taipei)
19. Italy (Italian Economic, Trade and Cultural Promotion Office in Taipei)
20. Ivory Coast (Honorary Consulate of the Republic of Côte D'Ivoire in Taipei)
21. Japan (Japan–Taiwan Exchange Association)
22. Jordan (Jordanian Commercial Office in Taipei)
23. Lithuania (Lithuanian Trade Representative Office in Taipei)
24. Luxembourg (Luxembourg Trade and Investment Office, Taipei)
25. Malaysia (Malaysian Friendship and Trade Centre, Taipei)
26. Mexico (Mexican Trade Services Documentation and Cultural Office in Taipei)
27. Mongolia (Ulaanbaatar Trade and Economic Representative Office in Taipei)
28. Netherlands (Netherlands Office, Taipei)
29. New Zealand (New Zealand Commerce and Industry Office, Taipei)
30. Oman (Commercial Office of the Sultanate of Oman in Taipei)
31. Peru (Commercial Office of Peru in Taipei)
32. Philippines (Manila Economic and Cultural Office/Philippine Representative Office in Taiwan)
33. Poland (Polish Office in Taipei)
34. Russia (Representative Office in Taipei for the Moscow-Taipei Coordination Commission on Economic and Cultural Cooperation)
35. Saudi Arabia (Saudi Arabian Trade Office in Taipei)
36. Singapore (Singapore Trade Office in Taipei)
37. Slovakia (Slovak Economic and Cultural Office, Taipei)
38. Somaliland (Republic of Somaliland Representative Office in Taiwan)
39. South Africa (Liaison Office of South Africa in Taipei)
40. South Korea (Korean Mission in Taipei)
41. Spain (Spanish Chamber of Commerce in Taiwan)
42. Sweden (Swedish Trade and Invest Council, Taipei Office)
43. Switzerland (Trade Office of Swiss Industries in Taipei)
44. Thailand (Thailand Trade and Economic Office, Taipei)
45. Turkey (Turkish Trade Office in Taipei)
46. United Kingdom (British Office, Taipei)
47. United States (American Institute in Taiwan)
48. Vietnam (Vietnam Economic and Cultural Office in Taipei)

in New Taipei City

1. Nigeria (Nigeria Trade Office in Taipei)

in Kaohsiung

1. Japan (Japan-Taiwan Exchange Association, Kaohsiung Office)
2. Philippines (Manila Economic and Cultural Office, Kaohsiung Extension Office)
3. United States (American Institute in Taiwan, Kaohsiung Branch Office)

in Taichung

1. Philippines (Manila Economic and Cultural Office, Taichung Extension Office)

== Gallery ==
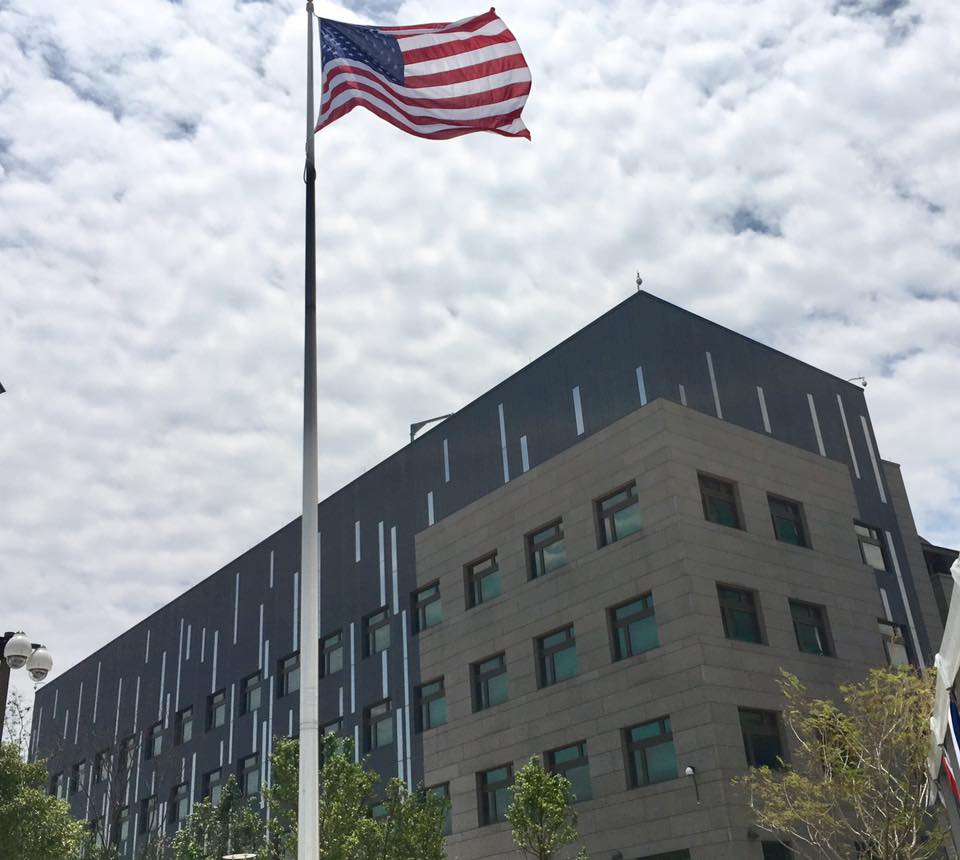
American Institute in Taiwan

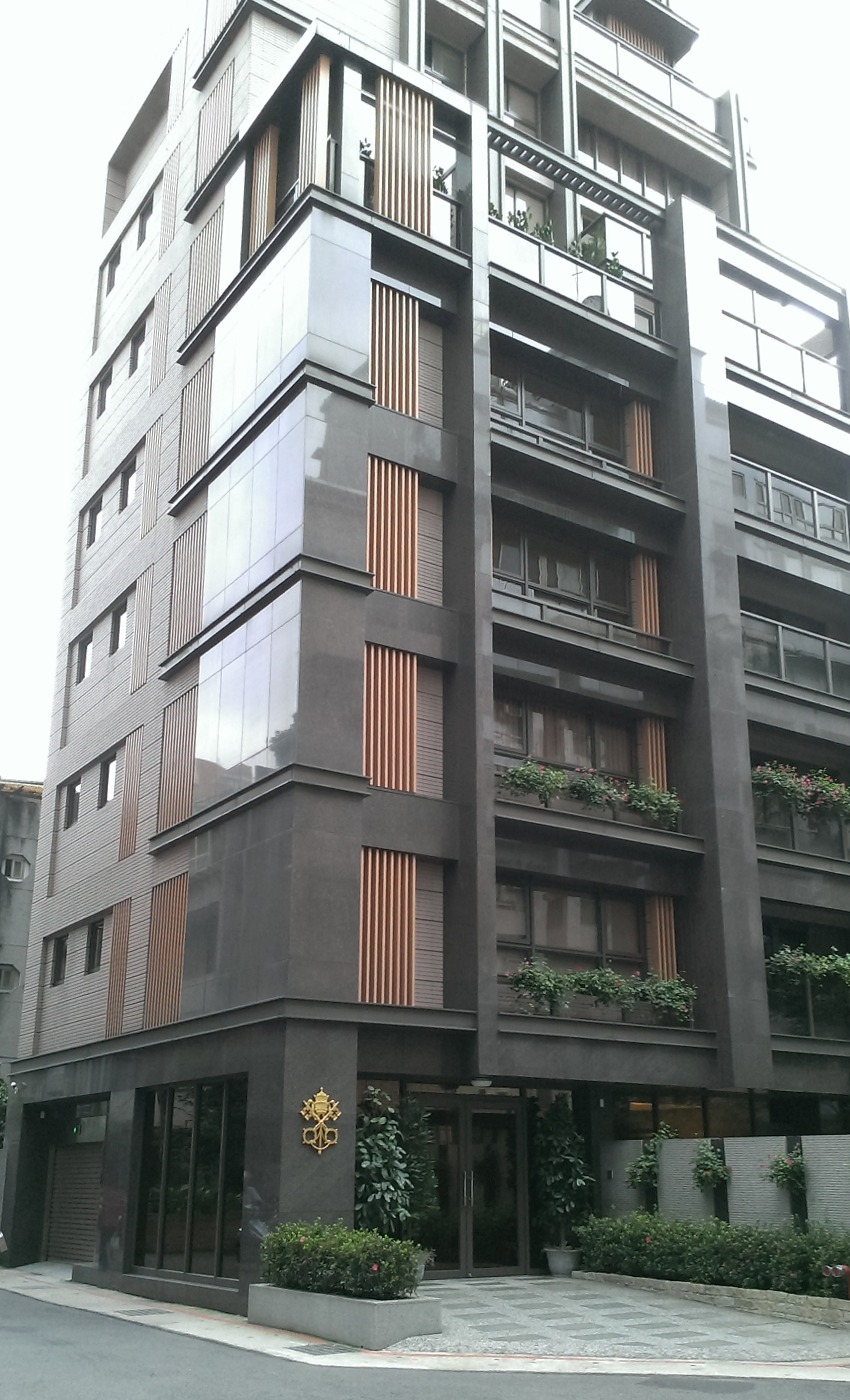
Apostolic Nunciature to the Republic of China (Taiwan) in Taipei

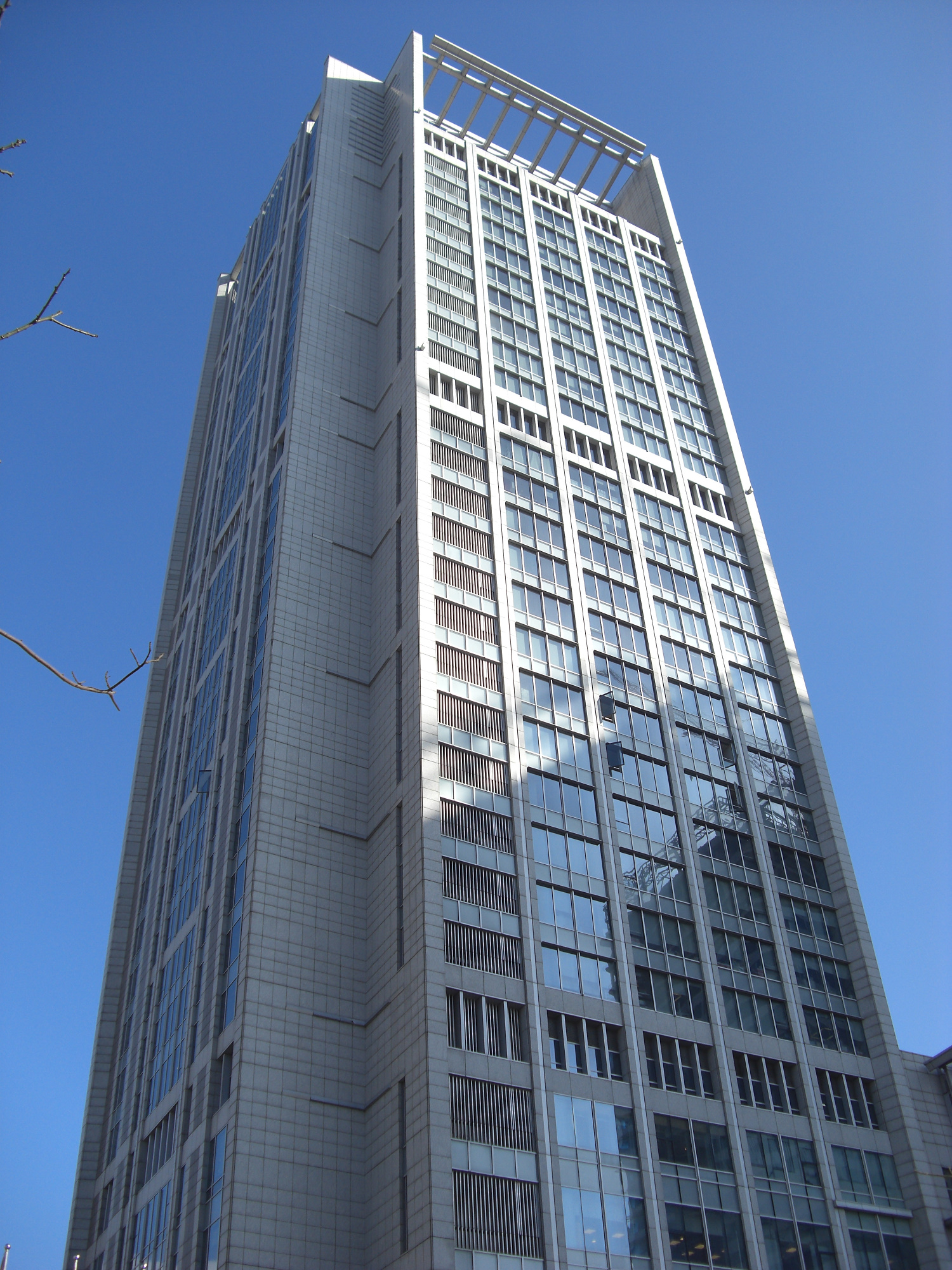
The Uni-President International Tower hosting the representative and trade offices of Australia, Hong Kong and the United Kingdom

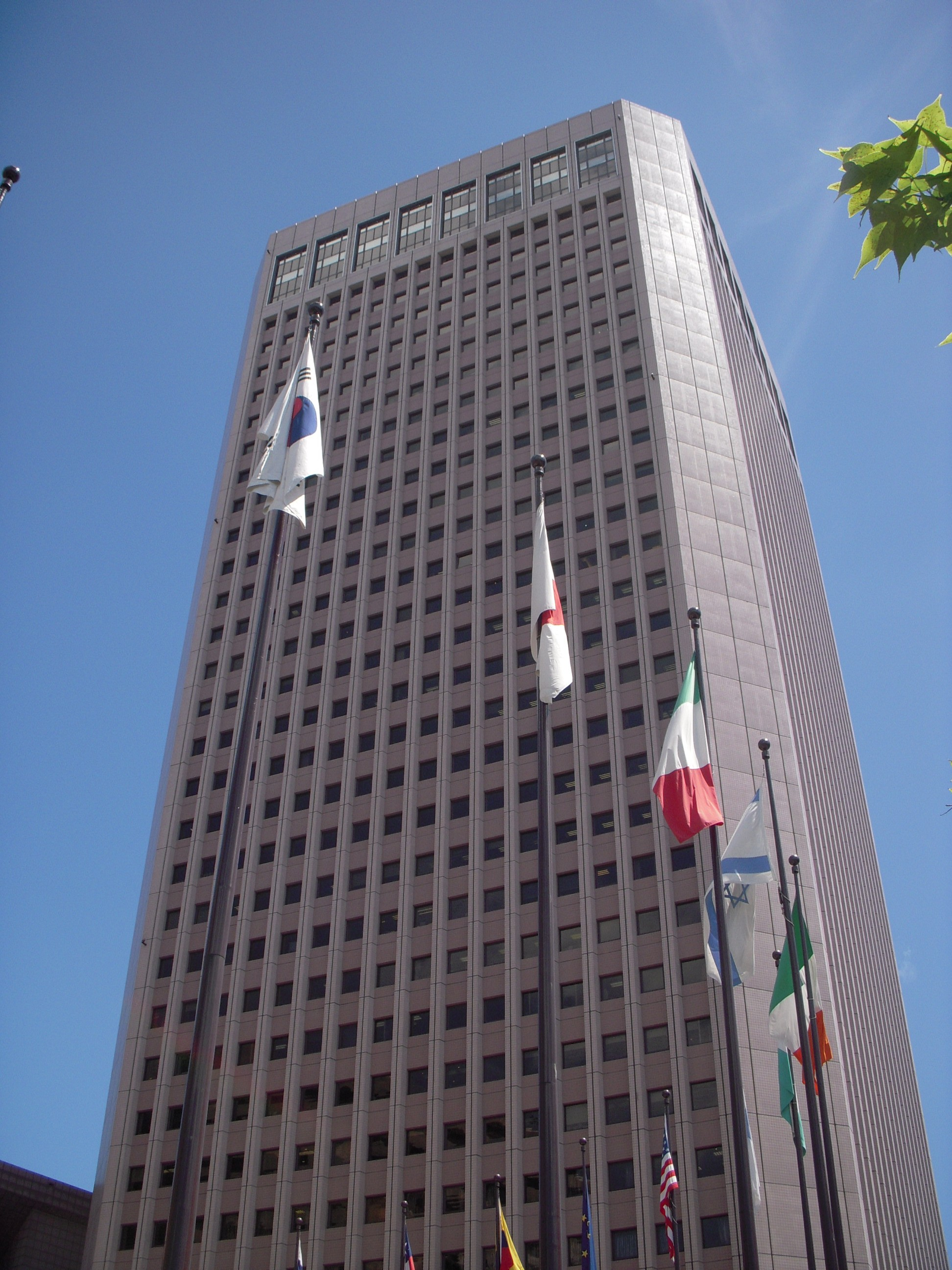
Taipei World Trade Center hosting the representative and trade offices of Argentina, Mexico, Mongolia, South Korea and Turkey

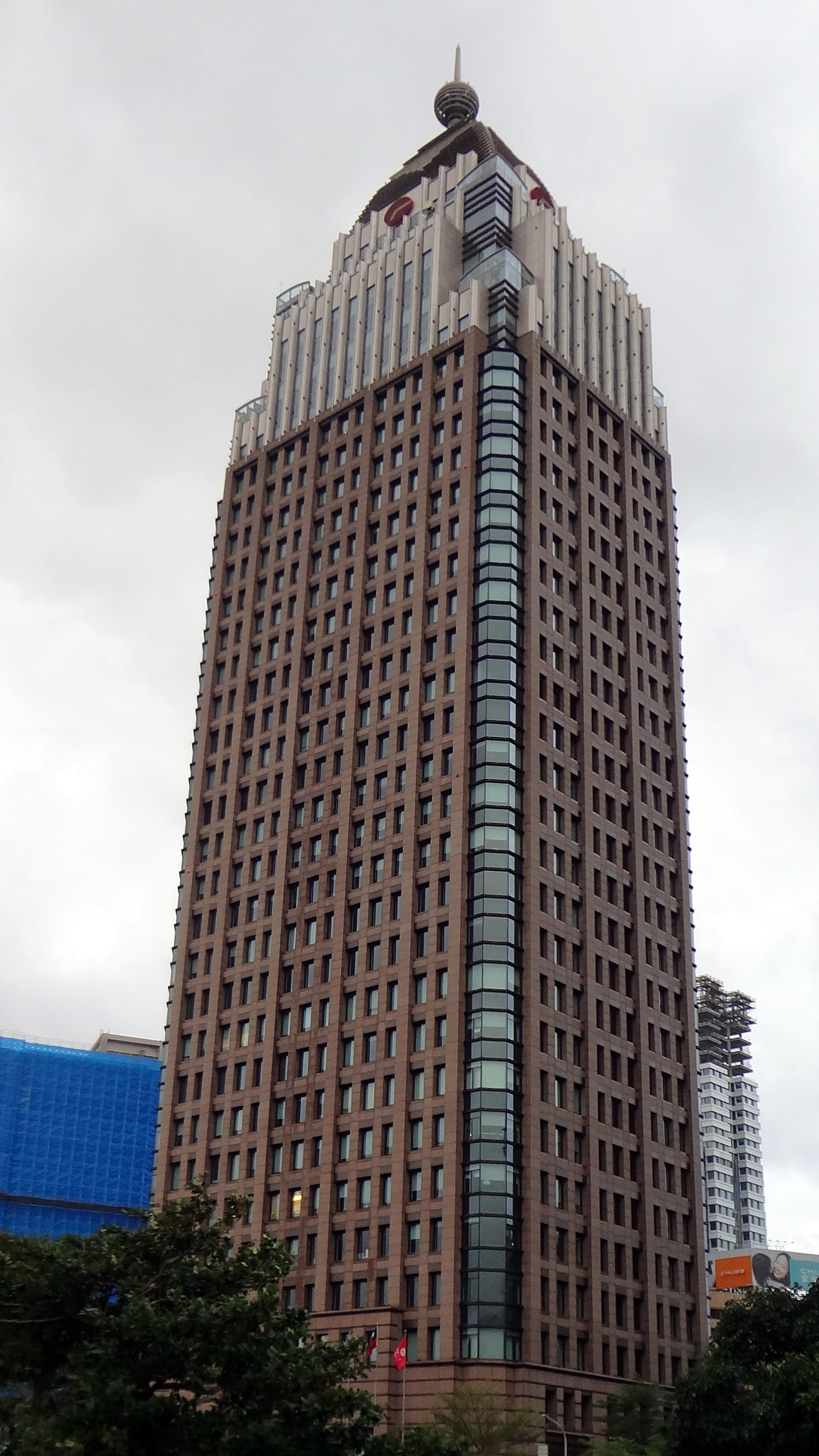
The Netherlands Office is located at the Farglory Financial Center

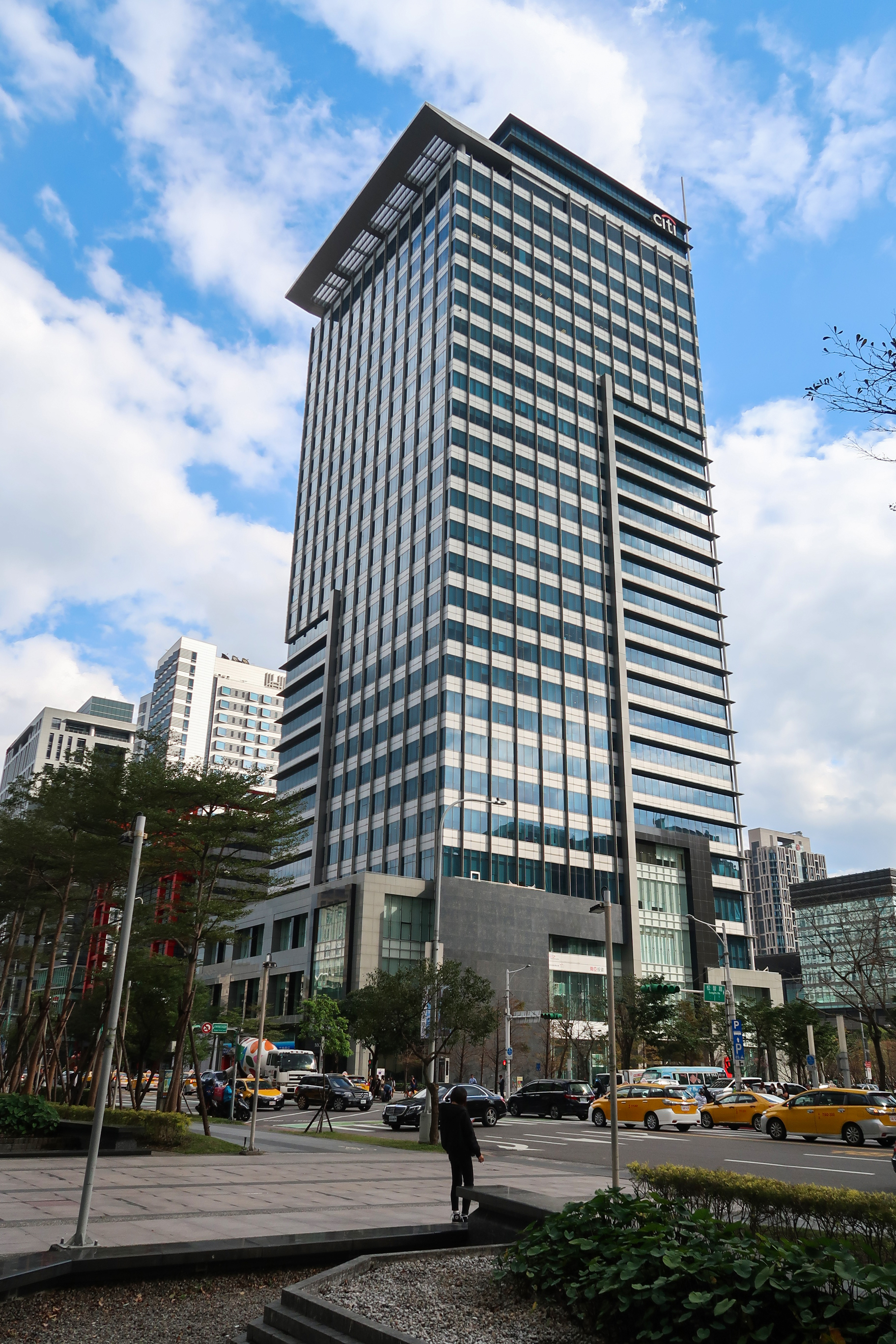
The Walsin Lihwa Building hosting the representative and trade offices of Canada and New Zealand

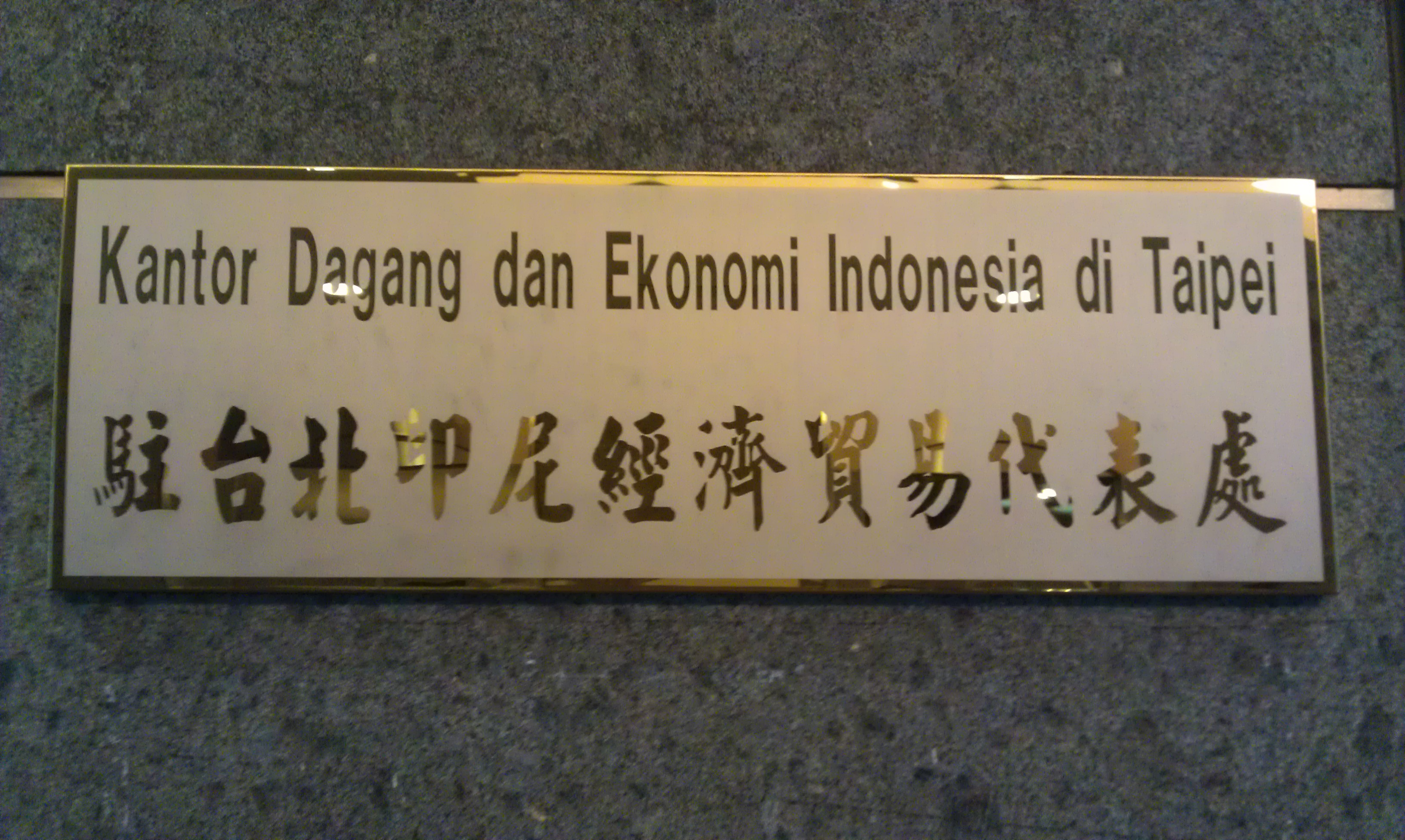
Indonesian Economic and Trade Office to Taipei

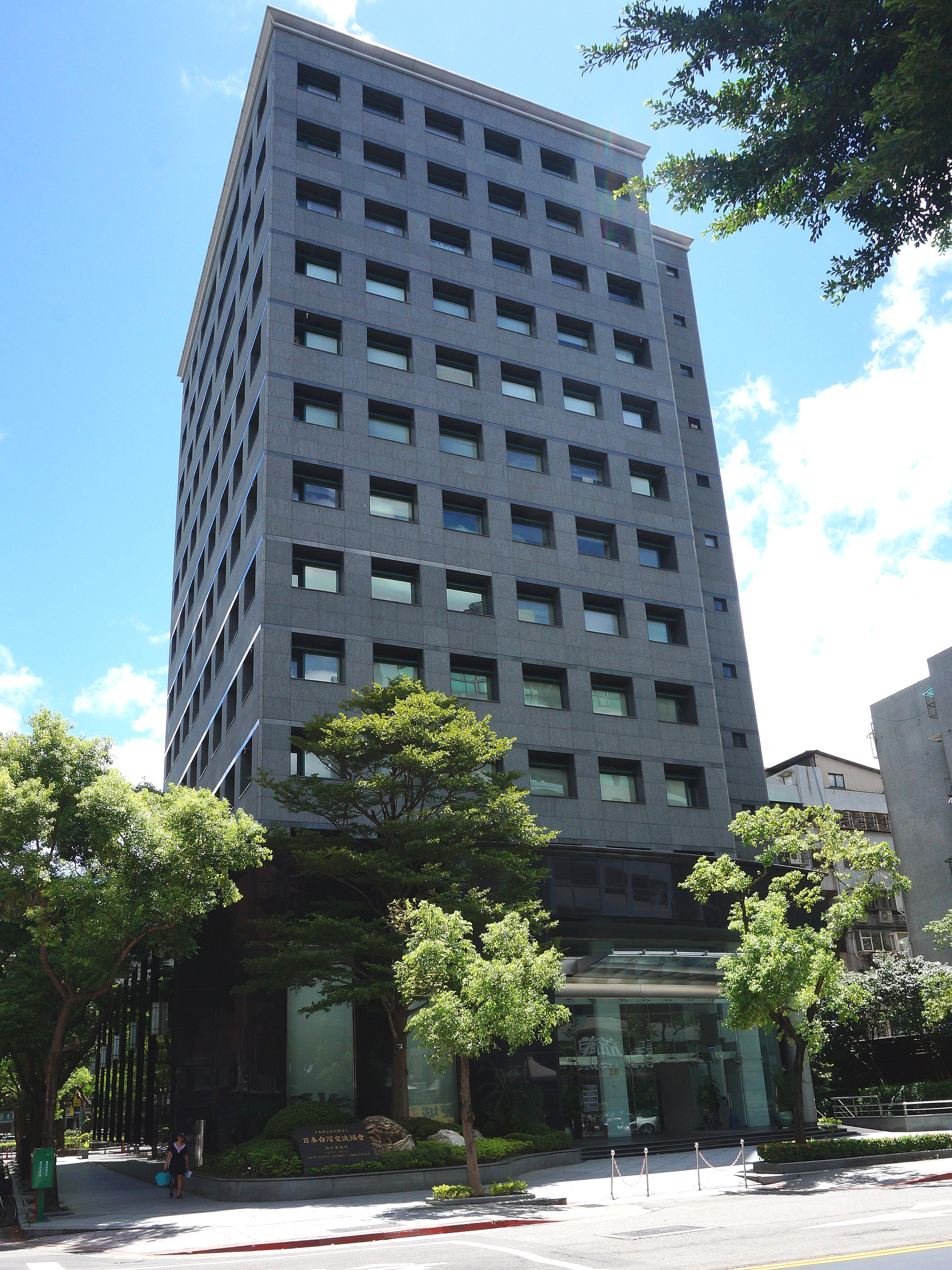
Japan–Taiwan Exchange Association

== See also ==
- Foreign relations of Taiwan
- List of diplomatic missions of Taiwan
- Ministry of Foreign Affairs (Republic of China)
