= Russians in Taiwan =

People from Russia living in Taiwan

Total population
- 593 (August 2021)

Regions with significant populations
- Taipei: 195
- New Taipei City: 131
- Taichung: 66

Languages
- Russian; Mandarin Chinese

Religion
- Russian Orthodox

Related ethnic groups
- Russian diaspora

Russians in Taiwan form a small community. As of August 2021, statistics of Taiwan's National Immigration Agency (NIA) showed 593 Russians holding valid Alien Resident Certificates. Informal estimates claim that their population may be as large as one thousand people. In history, the most well-known Russian in Taiwan was Chiang Fang-liang, wife of president Chiang Ching-kuo.

== History ==
Russians had visited Taiwan before the 20th century. The Chinese translation of a book written in 1875 was published in 2023, called Excursion to Formosa. Ethnographic journey of P. I. Ibis (Russian: Экскурсия на Формозу. Этнографическое путешествие П. И. Ибиса/Chinese: 1875．福爾摩沙之旅). It introduces the life story of Russian navy officer Pavel Ibis and his investigation notes on the indigenous people of Formosa. He participated in Askold's circumnavigation of the world, came to Taiwan alone for inspection in 1875, and published two journal articles, which were included in the Chinese translation. The Russian military officer Terentiev (В. А. Терентьев) came to Taiwan before Ibis came to Taiwan to collect information on the Mudan incident in 1874 and completed Formosa and the Japanese Conquest of Taiwan.

Some Russians from Shanghai and Harbin fled the establishment of the People's Republic of China and resettled in Taiwan in 1949. One cultural institution among the Russian community in Taiwan that survives from those days is the Astoria Confectionery and Cafe near Taipei Railway Station, the first Russian-style eatery on the whole island. Founded in 1949 by five Russian émigrés from Shanghai, it continues operating today with an early local business partner as the sole owner. In 2011, the Taipei City Government designated the Cafe Astoria as a historic building.

In recent years, the Representative Office for the Moscow-Taipei Coordination Commission on Economic and Cultural Cooperation has been active in promoting academic and professional exchanges between the two countries. According to NIA statistics, 174 Russian students studied at institutions in Taiwan, and 20 were employed as instructors; 21 were housewives, 28 were children under 15 years of age, and the remaining 120 engaged in other types of work. Unlike in other European communities, men are relatively scarce, with a sex ratio of 1.36 women for every man.

== See also ==
- Republic of China–Russia relations
