= Netherlands Office Taipei =

- 荷蘭在台辦事處
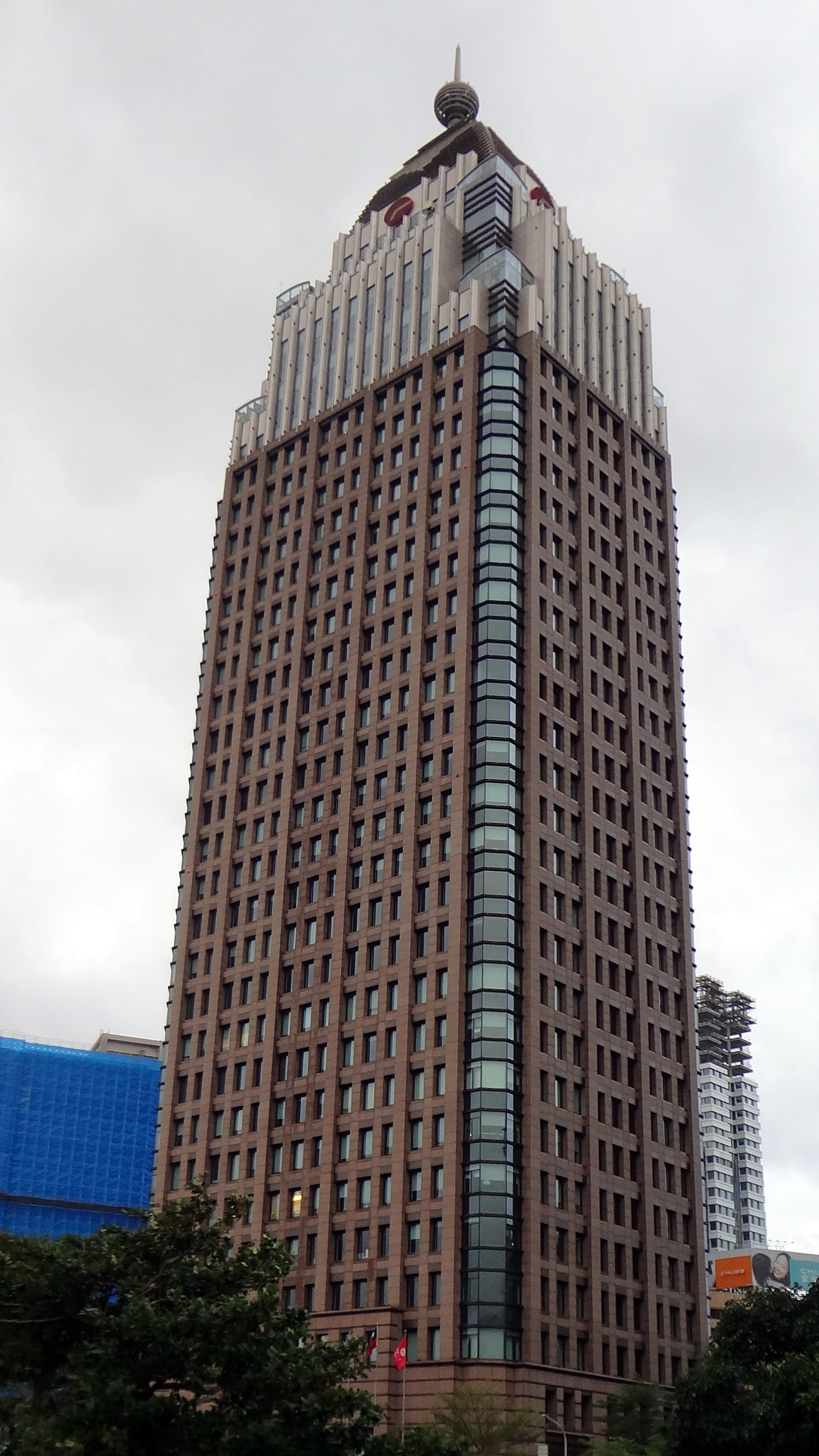
- The Netherlands Office Taipei is located at the Farglory Financial Center.

Agency overview
- Formed: 1981 (as Netherlands Council for Trade Promotion)
- Jurisdiction: Republic of China (Taiwan)
- Headquarters: Taipei, Taiwan
- Agency executive: Bastian Cornelis Maria Pulles, Representative
- Website: www.nlot.org.tw

The Netherlands Office Taipei represents interests of the Netherlands in Taiwan in the absence of formal diplomatic relations, functioning as a de facto embassy. Its counterpart in the Netherlands is the Taipei Representative Office in the Netherlands in The Hague.

== History ==
The representative office was established in 1981 as the Netherlands Council for Trade Promotion, later Netherlands Trade and Investment Office, a private foundation, but dependent on the Ministry of Economic Affairs for 70 per cent of its funding. In April 2020, it was renamed to Netherlands Office Taipei.

It also has a Visa and Consular Department, which handles all visa applications and consular matters for Taiwan.

The Office is headed by the Representative, Guido Tielman, who was appointed in August 2020.

== Transportation ==
The office is accessible within walking distance south of Taipei City Hall Station of Taipei Metro.

== See also ==
- List of diplomatic missions in Taiwan
- List of diplomatic missions of the Netherlands
