= Office of Austria, Taipei =

Austrian Office, Taipei
- 奧地利台北辦事處
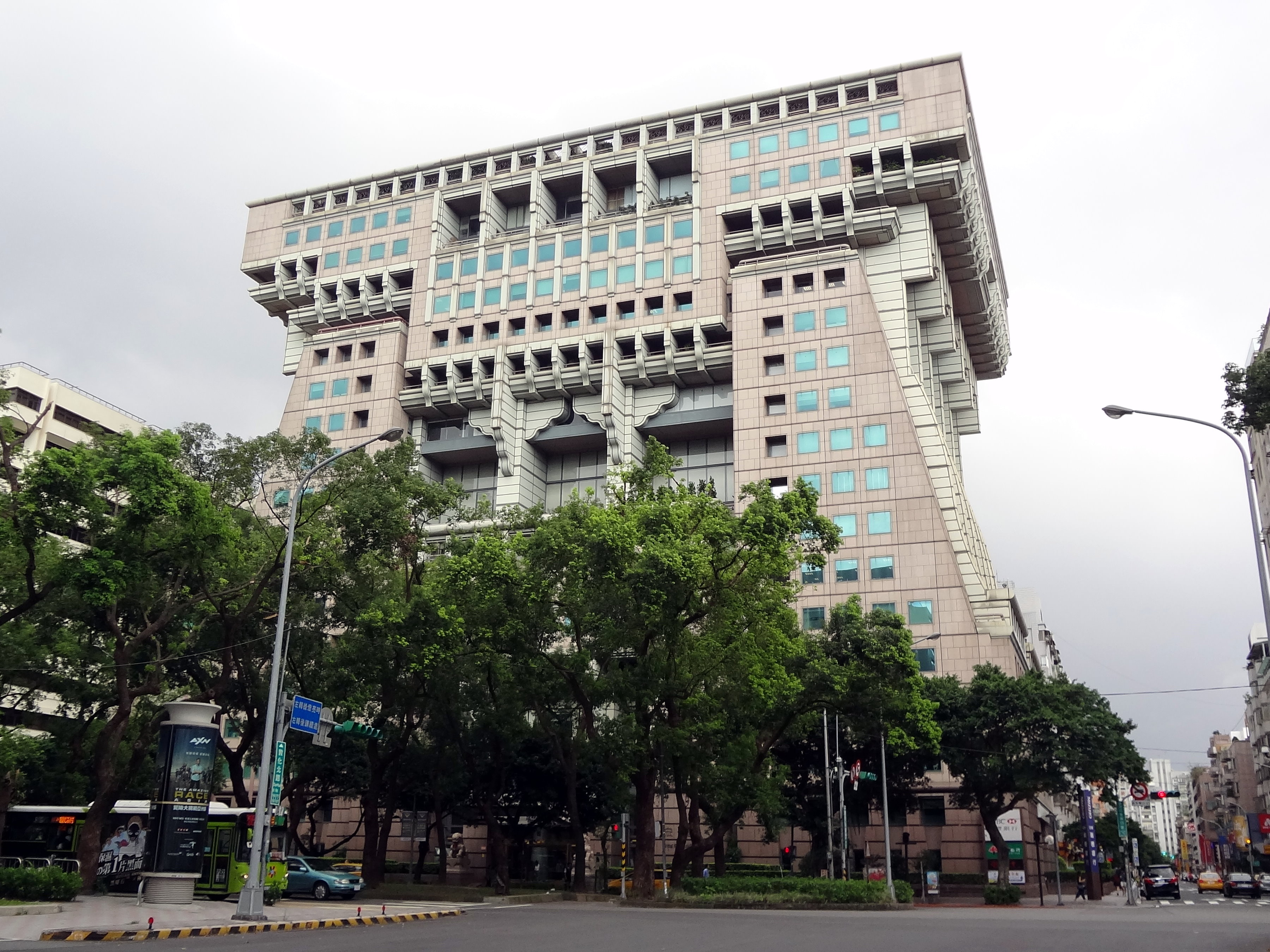
- Hung Kuo Building where the Austrian Office is located

Agency overview
- Formed: 1981
- Jurisdiction: Taiwan
- Headquarters: Taipei, Taiwan
- Agency executive: Christian Helbig, Director
- Website: Austrian Office Taipei

The Austrian Office, Taipei (Austrian German: Österreich Büros Taipei; Chinese: 奧地利台北辦事處; pinyin: Àodìlì Táiběi Bànshì Chù) represents the interests of Austria in Taiwan in the absence of formal diplomatic relations, functioning as a de facto embassy. Its counterpart in Austria is the Taipei Economic and Cultural Office in Vienna.

It was established in 1981 as the Austrian Trade Delegation.

== See also ==
- List of diplomatic missions in Taiwan
- List of diplomatic missions of Austria
