= Swedish Trade and Invest Council, Taipei Office =

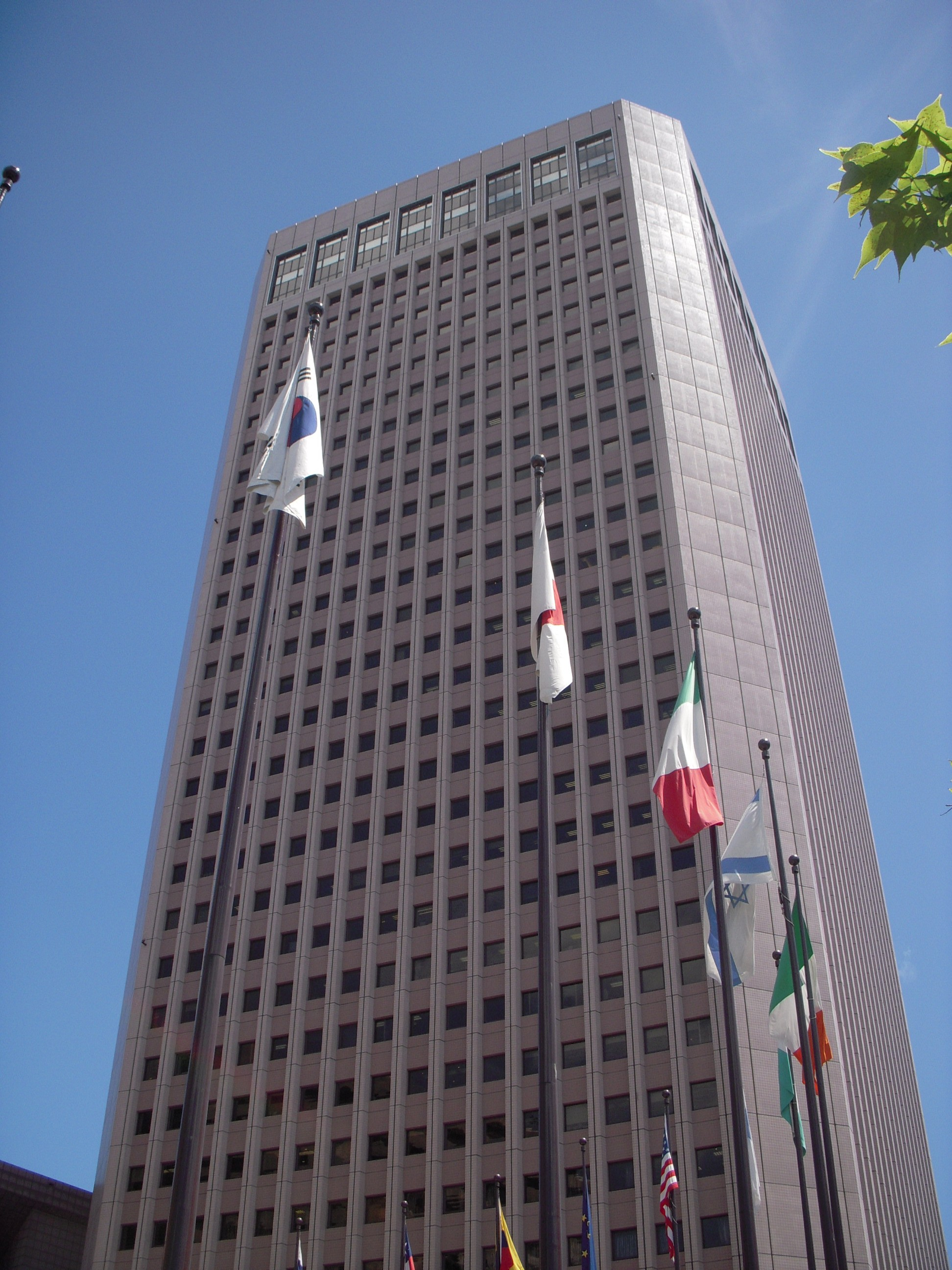
- The Swedish Office in Taipei at the International Trade Building.

Agency overview
- Formed: 1982
- Jurisdiction: Taiwan
- Headquarters: Taipei, Taiwan
- Agency executive: Margot Helena Elisabeth Reitberger, Representative
- Website: The Swedish Trade and Invest Council

The Swedish Trade and Invest Council, Taipei Office (Chinese: 瑞典貿易暨投資委員會台北辦事處), also known as the Swedish Representative Office in Taipei or Business Sweden in Taiwan. It represents interests of Sweden in Taiwan in the absence of formal diplomatic relations, functioning as a de facto embassy. Its counterpart in Sweden is the Taipei Mission in Sweden in Stockholm.

It was established in 1982 as the Swedish Industries' Trade Representative Office.

The office is headed by the Representative, Helena Reitberger.

== See also ==
- Business Sweden
- List of diplomatic missions in Taiwan
- List of diplomatic missions of Sweden
