= Tokutoshi Torii =

Architect

Tokutoshi Torii (鳥居 徳敏, Torii Tokutoshi; born 1947 in Toyokawa) is a Japanese architect and writer. He has lived for more than ten years in Zambia, researching Spanish architecture, especially the architecture of Gaudi, on which he has published several studies.

== Bibliography ==
- El munco enigmático de Gaudí, Madrid; Instituto de España, 1983, 2 vols. ISBN 84-85559-30-4
- Antonio Gaudí (The life of Gaudí), Tokyo; Kajimashuppankai, 1985 ISBN 4-306-05197-8
- The architecture of Gaudí ("Gaudí no kenchiku"), Tokyo; Kajimashuppankai, 1987 ISBN 4-306-04214-6
- The Philosophy of Gaudí ("Gaudí no Nanatsu no Shuchoo"), Tokyo; Kajimashuppankai, 1990 ISBN 4-306-06107-8
- The origins of Gaudí's architecture, Tokyo; Kajimashuppankai, 2001 ISBN 4-306-04418-1
- Gaudí, his architecture and his historical world, Tokyo; Chuokoronbijutsu-Shuppan, 2000 ISBN 4-8055-0368-8
- Gaudí, his complete writings and words, Tokyo; Chuokoronbijutsu-Shuppan, 2007 ISBN 978-4-8055-0554-0

== Works ==
- Jizo Tower of Hatagaya, Tokyo 1971–73
- Reconstruction of Gaudi's project of the Catholic Missions for Africa in Tangiers (1892–93) 1981–82
- Casa de España (project), Tokyo 1984
- Asahiya Hotel, Tsukuba, Ibaraki, 1986–87 (Mugito Architects)
- Sinkong Life Insurance Group Headquarters (project), Taipei 1986–87 (KMG *Architects & Engineers)
- Association of East Asian Relations, Tokyo, 1987–89 (KMG Architects & Engineers)
- Club House, Uchihara Country Club, Uchihara, Ibaraki 1989–90 (KMG Architects & Engineers)
- Takatsu Hotel, Tsukuba, Ibaraki, 1989–90 (Mugito Architects)
- Club House, Higashi-Chiba Country Club, Togane, Chiba, 1990–93 (KMG Architects & Engineers)
- Club House, Tong Hwa Country Club, Taipei 1990–93 (KMG Architects & Engineers)
- Club House, Kozaki Country Club, Kozaki, Chiba, 1992–93 (KMG Architects & Engineers)
- Taiwan Cement Building, Taipei 1991–97 (KMG Architects & Engineers)
- Cathay Financial Center, Taipei 1995–97 (KMG Architects & Engineers)
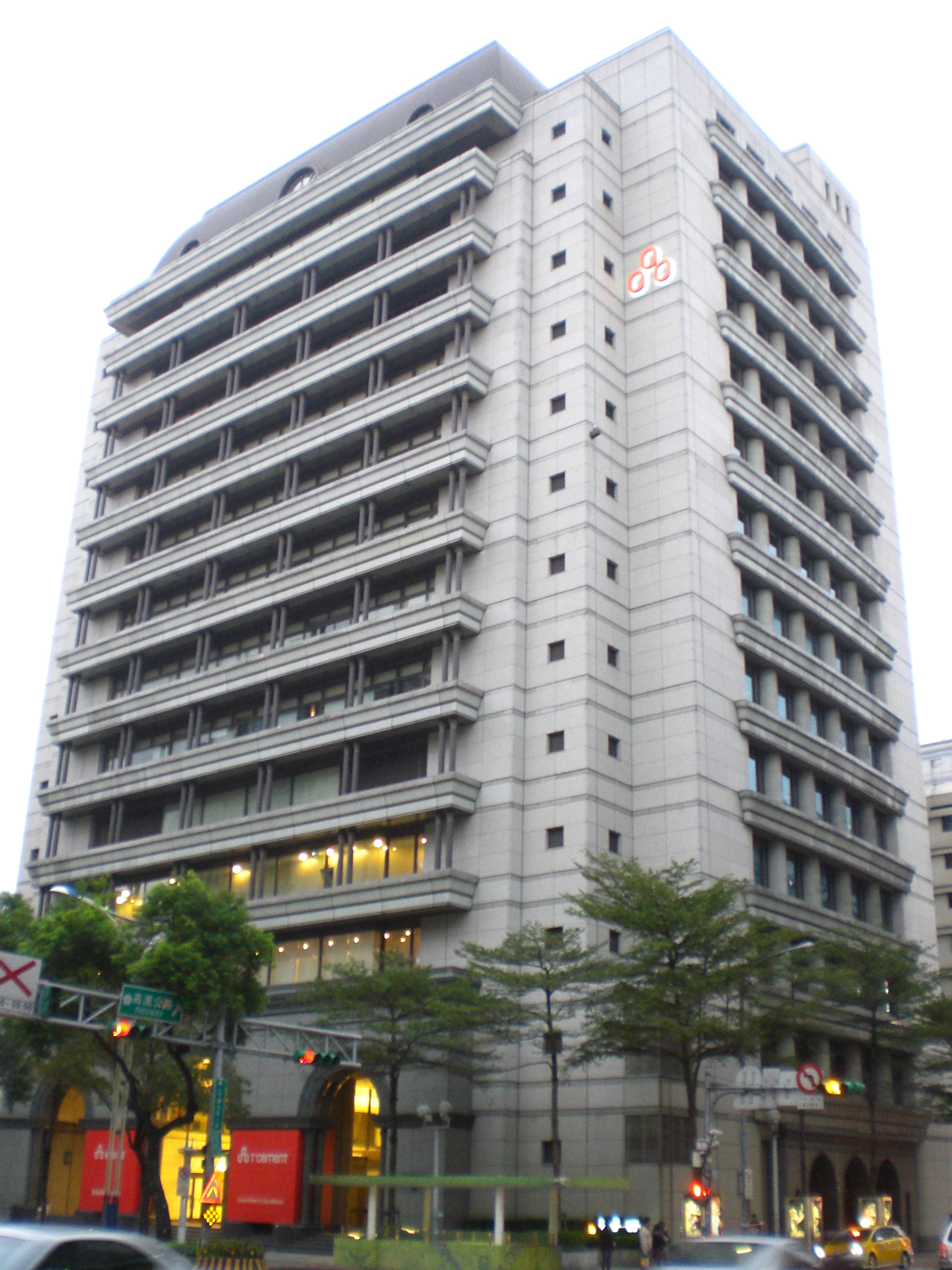
Taiwan Cement Building

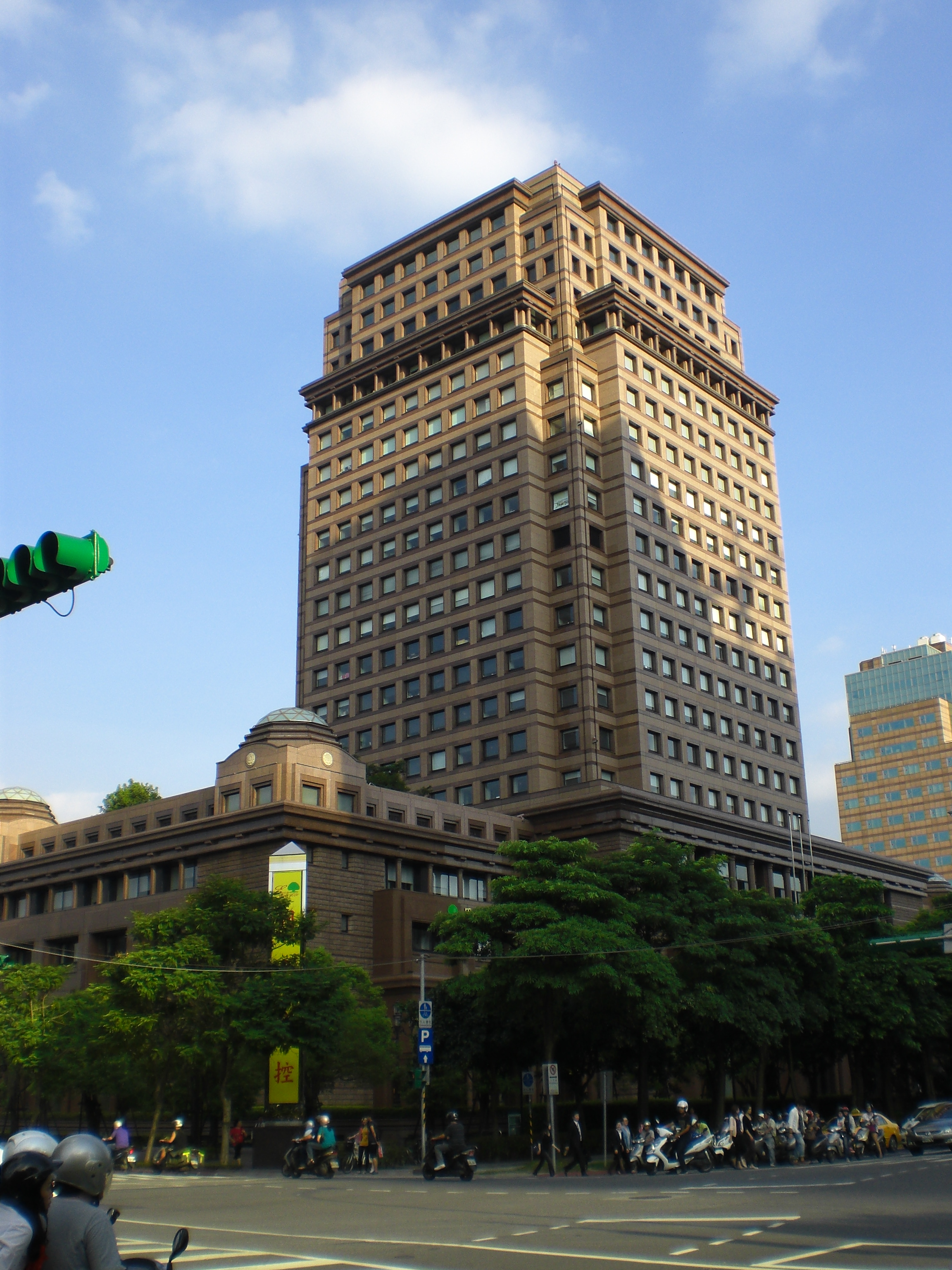
Cathay Financial Center
