= Representative Office in Taipei for the Moscow-Taipei Coordination Commission on Economic and Cultural Cooperation =

Unofficial mission of Russia in Taiwan

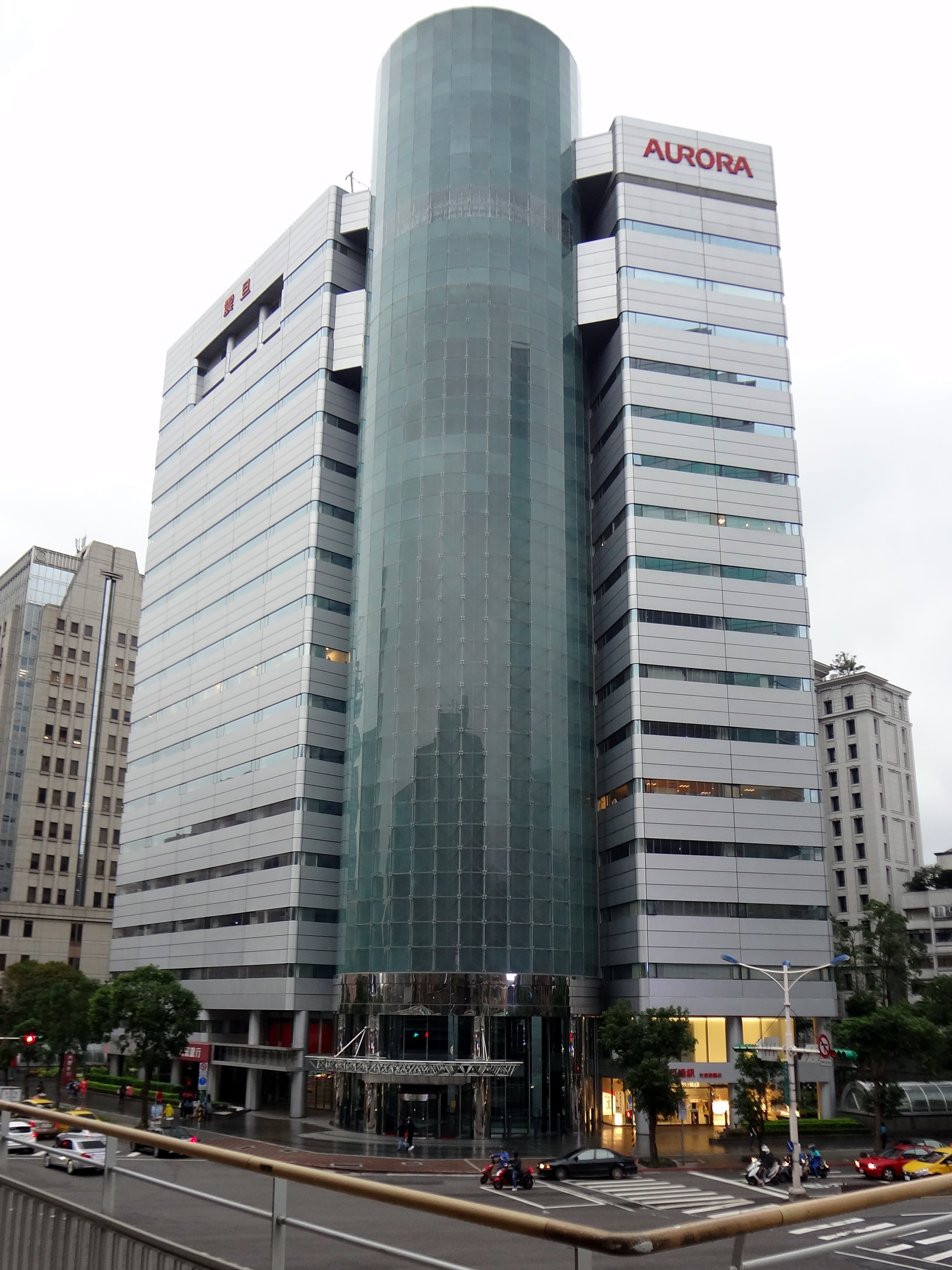
- The Representative Office at the Aurora International Building

Agency overview
- Formed: 15 December 1996
- Jurisdiction: Republic of China (Taiwan)
- Headquarters: Xinyi, Taipei, Taiwan
- Agency executive: Sergey Chudodeev, Acting Representative
- Website: www.mtc.org.tw

The Representative Office in Taipei for the Moscow-Taipei Coordination Commission on Economic and Cultural Cooperation (Russian: Московско-Тайбэйская Координационная Комиссия по Экономическому и Культурному Сотрудничеству; Chinese: 莫斯科台北經濟文化協調委員會駐台代表處) is the representative office of Russia in Taiwan, functioning as a de facto embassy in the absence of diplomatic relations. Its counterpart is the Representative Office in Moscow for the Taipei-Moscow Economic and Cultural Coordination Commission in Moscow.

Due to historical and political factors, Russia and Taiwan do not have formal diplomatic relations between each other. As the two countries cannot have direct political and diplomatic relations, on 15 September 1992, then President of Russia Boris Yeltsin signed the decree On Relations between the Russian Federation and Taiwan, which is currently the legal basis for the development of relations between Russia and Taiwan. As a result of the decree, the Moscow-Taipei Coordination Commission on Economic and Cultural Cooperation is considered as a formal foreign office.

The Russian Federation and Taiwan established representative offices in each other in 1996 and 1993 respectively. At present, the Moscow-Taipei Coordination Commission on Economic and Cultural Cooperation not only handles exchanges and cooperation in the fields of economy, technology and culture, but also has a consular office that handles visas and provides various assistance to Russian citizens in Taiwan.

On 16 October 2013, the Taiwan-Russia Air Services Agreement was signed by representatives of Russia and Taiwan in Taipei. A direct flight from Moscow to Taipei was started on 3 July 2014, which was operated by Transaero Airlines.

== Heads of Mission ==
The Representative Office in Taipei for the Moscow-Taipei Coordination Commission on Economic and Cultural Cooperation is headed by a Representative (Представитель), the following is a list of Representatives since the Mission's establishment in 1996.

List of Representatives
No.	Name	Tenure
1	Viktor Trifanov (Виктор Трифонов)	1996-2001
2	Vladislav Verchenko (Владислав Верченко)	2001–2005
3	Sergey Gubarev (Сергей НГубарев)	2005–2009
4	Vasily Dobrovolsky (Василий Добровольский)	2009-2015
5	Dmitry Polansky (Дмитрий Полянский)	2016-2018
6	Sergey Petrov (Сергей Петров)	2018-2021
7	Yury Metelev (Юрий Метелев)	2021–2026
8	TBA	

== See also ==
- Russians in Taiwan
- Russia–Taiwan relations
- List of diplomatic missions in Taiwan
- List of diplomatic missions of Russia
