= Cathay United Bank =

Large commercial bank in Taiwan

- Type: Public company
- Traded as: TWSE: 2882; S&P Asia 50 component
- Industry: Banking
- Founded: 4 January 1975
- Headquarters: Taipei, Taiwan
- Number of locations: 165 (branches)
- Products: Financial services
- Total equity: TW$67 billion (approximately US$2.23 billion)
- Parent: Cathay Financial Holdings
- Website: www.cathaybk.com.tw

Cathay United Bank (Chinese: 國泰世華銀行; pinyin: Guótài Shìhuá Yínháng) is one of the largest commercial banks in Taiwan, with a capital value of TW$67 billion (approximately US$2.23 billion) and more than 165 branches located throughout Taiwan. It is part of Cathay Financial Holdings.

== History ==
Cathay United Bank was formerly the United World Chinese Commercial Bank (UWCCB; Chinese: 世華聯合商業銀行), which was founded in 1975. In December 1982, NT$14 million was stolen from UWCCB in the largest Taiwanese bank robbery at the time.

In 2003, UWCCB merged with the Cathay Commercial Bank, a wholly owned subsidiary of Cathay Financial Holding Company; UWCCB was the surviving bank but the merged bank was renamed to Cathay United Bank.

In September 2012 Cathay United Bank with the National Bank of Cambodia's approval, acquired a 70% stake in Singapore Banking Corporation (SBC). SBC was founded in 1993 and has 6 branches and 10 exchange offices in Cambodia. A year later in September 2013, Cathay United Bank reached an agreement with the remaining shareholders of SBC to acquire the remaining 30% shares. In January 2014, the name was changed to Cathay United Bank Cambodia (CUBC).

To expand its banking operations in Asia, in December 2014, CUB through its sister company and life insurance arm of Cathay Financial Holding, Cathay Life Insurance, acquired a 22% share (approximately US$179 million) of Philippines' Rizal Commercial Banking Corporation (RCBC). RCBC is owned by the Yuchengco Group and is the country's eighth largest lender with a consolidated branch network of over 430 branches. RCBC is connected with the $81m Bangladesh Bank heist; and as a result, the bank's president resigned in May 2016.

In January 2015, Cathay Life Insurance announced a plan to acquire 40% of Indonesia's PT Bank Mayapada for approximately US$272 million. Bank Mayapada, founded in 1989, is a mid-sized commercial bank focused on corporate lending with 175 branches and offices and owned by Indonesian billionaire Dato Sri Tahir.

In May 2017, Cathay United Bank and its sister company Cathay Life agreed to purchase the Bank of Nova Scotia Berhad Malaysia from Scotiabank. The acquisition is subject to regulatory approval by Bank Negara Malaysia.

== Overseas Branches/Offices ==
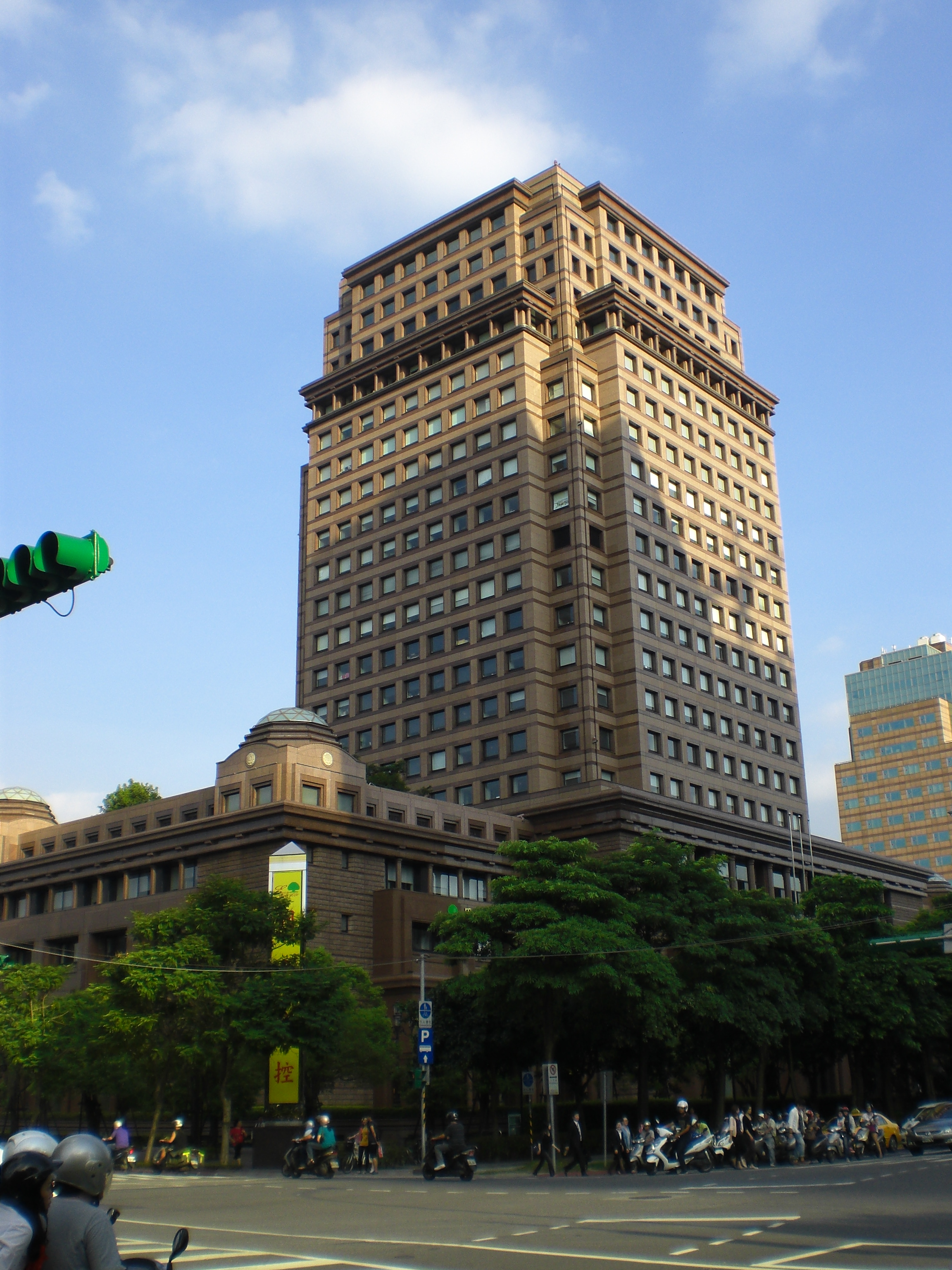
Cathay Financial Center

Currently Cathay United Bank has 9 overseas branches and sub-branches as well 6 marketing and representative offices, including one agency, located in countries such as China, Singapore, Malaysia, Vietnam and Cambodia. The Hong Kong and Shanghai branches focus mainly on Greater China, while the Singapore branch is very active in the ASEAN local foreign exchange and money markets and is a major investor in Southeast Asian investment grade credits.

=== Mainland China ===
A Subsidiary Bank was formally opened in September 2018

- Shanghai Branch
- Shanghai Minhang Sub-branch
- Shanghai Pilot Free Trade Zone Sub-Branch
- Shanghai Jiading Sub-Branch
- Qingdao Branch
- Shenzhen Branch

=== Cambodia ===
- PhnomPenh Branch (10 Different branches)
  1. Head Office (St. Somdach Pan)
  2. Nehru
  3. Mao Tse Tung
  4. Toul Tumpoung II
  5. Chbar Am Pov
  6. Heng Ly
  7. Chaom Chau
  8. Stat Chas
  9. Stueng Meanchey
  10. Saen Sokh
- SiemReap Branch
- Sihanoukville Branch
- Kampong Cham Branch
- Krong Bavet Branch
- Battambang Branch

=== Hong Kong ===
- Hong Kong Branch

=== Indonesia ===
- Jakarta Representative Office

=== Laos ===
- Vientiane Capital Branch

=== Malaysia ===
- Labuan Branch
- Kuala Lumpur Marketing Office

=== Myanmar ===
- Yangon Representative Office

=== Philippines ===
- Manila Branch

=== Singapore ===
- Singapore Branch

=== Thailand ===
- Bangkok Representative Office

=== Vietnam ===
- Chu Lai Representative Office
- Hanoi Representative Office
- Ho Chi Minh City Branch

== Joint Ventures and Subsidiary ==
Indovina Bank, Vietnam (Chinese: 世越銀行)

- Cathay United Bank was the first Taiwanese bank to establish a banking presence in Vietnam. In 1990, Cathay United Bank with its local joint venture partner, Vietnam Joint Stock Commercial Bank for Industry and Trade (Vietinbank) established Indovina Bank (IVB). Indovina Bank, headquartered in Ho Chi Minh City, is a commercial bank with 9 branches and 17 transaction offices.

== See also ==
- List of banks in Taiwan
- Economy of Taiwan
- List of companies of Taiwan
