= Office of the United Kingdom, Taipei =

Representative office in Taipei, Taiwan

British Office, Taipei 英國在台辦事處
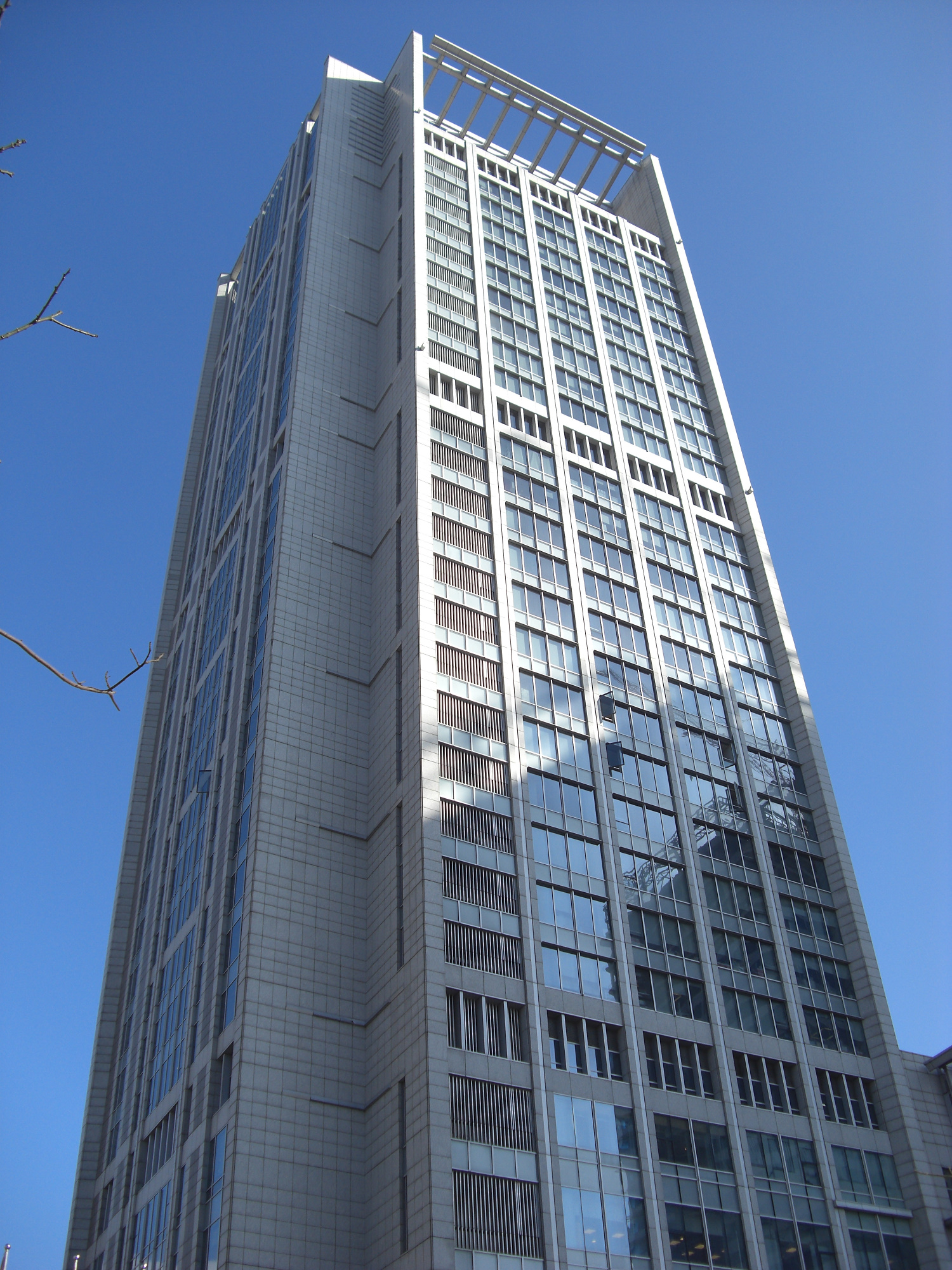
- The Office at the Uni-President International Tower
- Location: Taipei, Taiwan
- Address: 26F, President International Tower, No. 9-11, Song Gao Road, Xinyi District
- Coordinates: 25°02′23″N 121°33′56″E
- Permanent representative: Ruth Bradley-Jones
- Website: British Office Taipei

The British Office, Taipei (Chinese: 英國在台辦事處; pinyin: Yīngguó Zài Tái Bànshì Chù; Pe̍h-ōe-jī: Eng-kok chāi Tâi Pān-sū-chhù) is the representative office of the United Kingdom Government in Taiwan. It maintains and develops financial, educational, cultural, and technological relations and provides assistance to British nationals in Taiwan. It functions as a de facto embassy in the absence of diplomatic relations between Westminster and Taipei.

Its Taiwanese counterpart in the United Kingdom is the Taipei Representative Office in the United Kingdom.

== Background ==
There are hundreds of UK companies in Taiwan across sectors such as finance, telecommunications, infrastructure, environmental technology, creative industries and marine industries. The late 2010s presented particular opportunities in offshore wind, railways and nuclear decommissioning. Taiwan also serves as a springboard into China for UK companies.

== Principal officers ==
=== Heads of mission ===
| Name | Photo | Tenure | Note |
|---|---|---|---|
Director General, British Trade and Culture Office (1993–2015)
| Philip Morrice | | 1993 – 1995 | |
| Alan S. Collins | | 1995 – 1998 | |
| David Coates | | 1999 – 2002 | |
| Derek R. Marsh | | 2002 – 2005 | |
| Michael D. Reilly | | 2006 – 2009 | |
| David Campbell | | 2009 – 2013 | |
| Chris Wood | | 2013-2015 | |
Representative, British Office Taipei (2015–)
| Chris Wood | | 2015 –2016 | |
| Damion Potter | | 2016 | Acting |
| Catherine Nettleton | | 2016 – 2020 | |
| Andrew Thomas Pittam | | 2020 | Acting |
| John Dennis | | 2020 – 2025 | |
| Ruth Bradley-Jones | | 2025 – | |

=== Deputy heads of mission ===
| Name | Photo | Tenure | Note |
|---|---|---|---|
Deputy Director General, British Trade and Culture Office (1993–2015)
| Deborah Anne Clarke | | 1997- | |
| Jeremy Francis Larner | | 1999 – 2002 | |
| Roderick Bunten | | 2002 – 2005 | |
| Charles Edmund Garrett | | 2005-2009 | |
| Margaret Tongue | | 2009-2013 | |
| Damion Potter | | 2013-2015 | |
Deputy Representative, British Office Taipei (2015–)
| Damion Potter | | 2015-2017 | |
| Andrew Thomas Pittam | | 2017-2021 | |
| Thomas "Tom" Burn | | 2021- | |

== Location ==
The office has been located in President International Tower (統一國際大樓) in Xinyi District since 22 January 2008. It is accessible within walking distance south of Taipei City Hall Station of the Taipei Metro.

The office is co-located with the British Council and the British Chamber of Commerce in Taipei.

== History ==
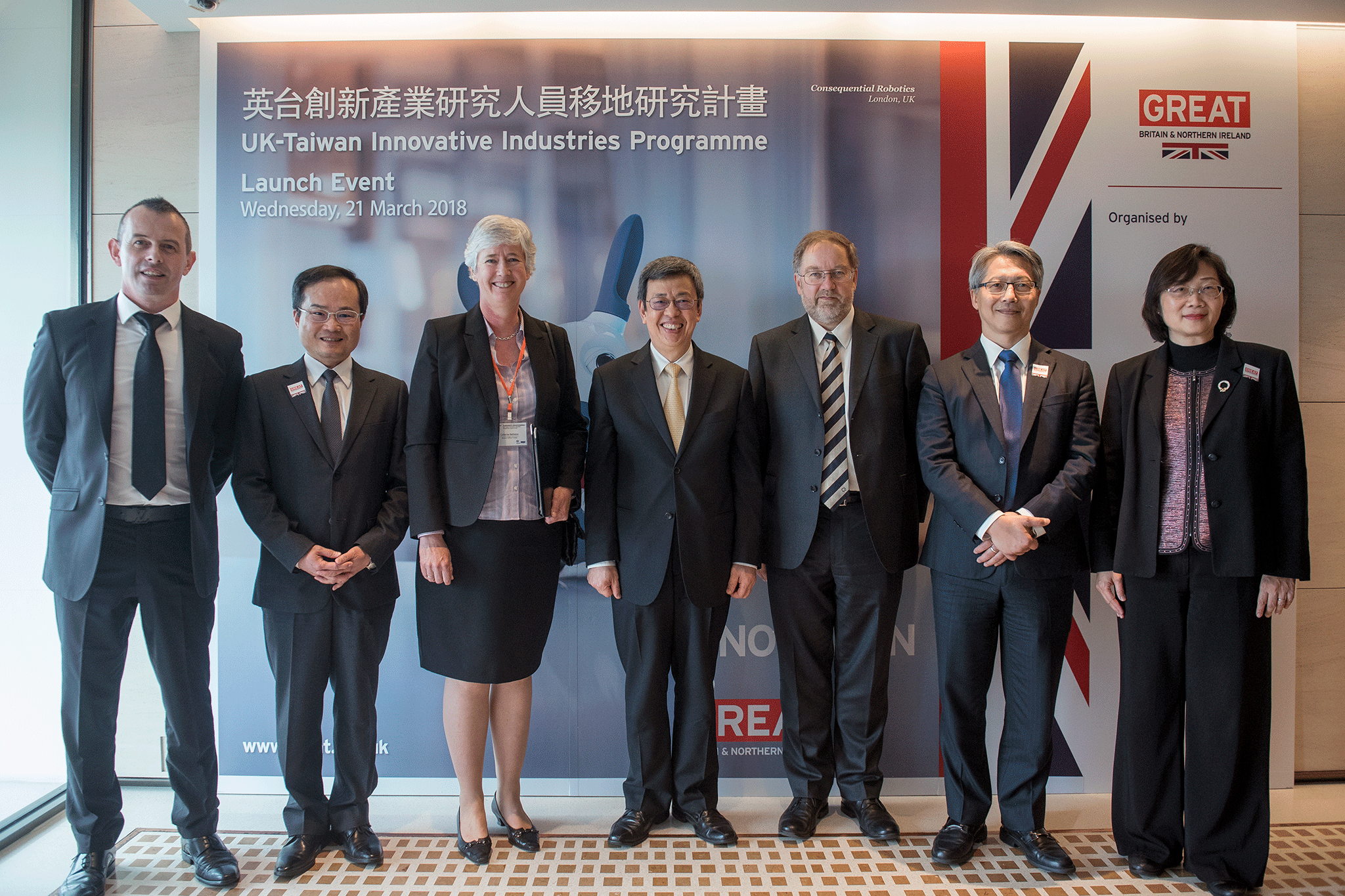
Interior of the British Office on 21 March 2018.

The office, then known as the British Trade and Cultural Office, was opened in October 1993. It succeeded the Anglo-Taiwan Trade Committee, a privately financed entity established in 1976, following the closure of the British Consulate in Tamsui, Taipei County in 1972. Unlike its predecessor, it could issue visas directly to people in Taiwan.

The British Council, which had taken over and expanded the functions of the private Anglo-Taiwan Education Centre, operated the Office's Cultural and Education Section.

On 26 May 2015, its name was changed to British Office Taipei to reflect the full scope of the office work, and the title of its head was changed from "Director General" to "Representative".

== See also ==
- List of diplomatic missions in Taiwan
- Taiwan–United Kingdom relations
- Foreign relations of the United Kingdom
- Foreign relations of Taiwan
