= Taipei Representative Office, The Hague =

Taipei Representative Office in the Netherlands 駐荷蘭台北代表處
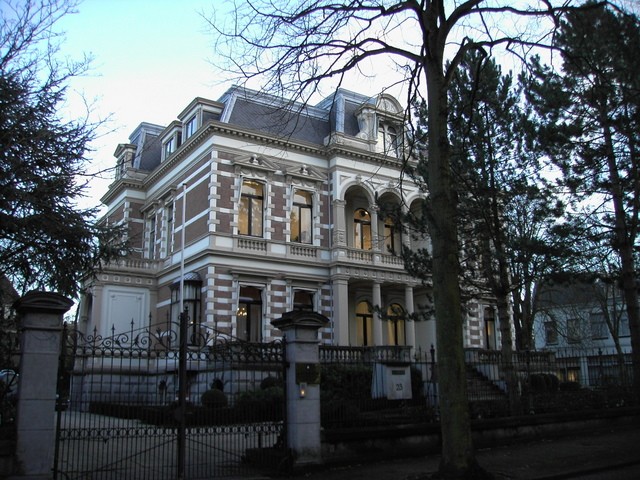
- Taipei Representative Office in the Netherlands

Agency overview
- Formed: 1979 (as Far East Trade Office)
- Jurisdiction: Netherlands (excluding Dutch Caribbean)
- Headquarters: The Hague, Netherlands
- Agency executive: James Chung-kwang Tien, Representative
- Website: Taipei Representative Office in the Netherlands

The Taipei Representative Office in the Netherlands (Chinese: 駐荷蘭台北代表處; pinyin: Zhù Hélán Táiběi Dàibiǎo Chù) represents the interests of Taiwan in the Netherlands in the absence of formal diplomatic relations, functioning as a de facto embassy. Its counterpart in Taiwan is the Netherlands Office Taipei in Taipei.

It was established as the Far East Trade Office in 1979. The Office is headed by a Representative, currently Hsing Hsing Chen.

== Dutch Caribbean ==
While the Taipei Representative Office in the Netherlands has responsibility for the European Netherlands, the Embassies of the Republic of China in Saint Kitts and Nevis and Saint Vincent and the Grenadines have responsibility for the countries and special municipalities of the Dutch Caribbean.

Mission	Area of responsibility
Embassy of the Republic of China (Taiwan) at St. Kitts and Nevis	Sint Eustatius, Sint Maarten and Saba
Embassy of the Republic of China (Taiwan) Kingstown, St. Vincent and the Grenadines	Aruba, Bonaire and Curaçao

== Representatives ==
- Nelson Ku (1997–2000)
- Katharine Chang (2003–2006)
- Larry Wang (2006–2008)
- Chen, Hsing Hsing (2019–2024)
- Tien, Chung-kwang (2025-)

== See also ==
- List of diplomatic missions of Taiwan
- List of diplomatic missions in the Netherlands
