= Farglory International Center =

Skyscraper office building in Xinyi District, Taipei, Taiwan

Farglory International Center 遠雄國際商務中心
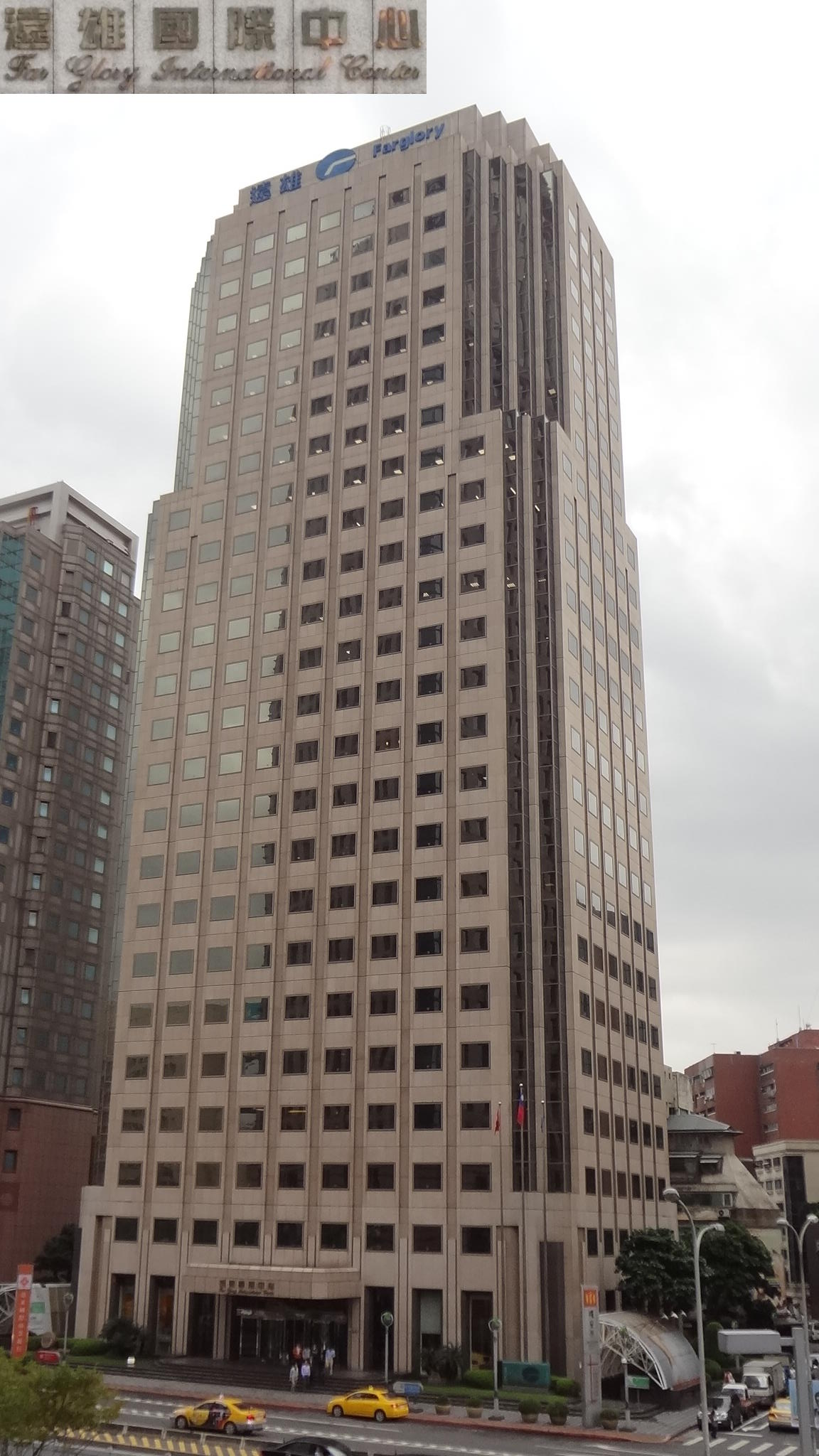
- Interactive map of the Farglory International Center 遠雄國際商務中心 area

General information
- Status: Completed
- Type: Office building
- Classification: Office
- Location: No. 200, Section 1, Keelung Road, Xinyi District, Taipei, Taiwan
- Coordinates: 25.040453675467607°N 121.56365328588211°E
- Completed: 1989

Height
- Roof: 105 m (344 ft)

Technical details
- Floor count: 26

The Farglory International Center (Chinese: 遠雄國際商務中心) is a 26-story, 105-metre (344 ft) skyscraper office building completed in 1989 in Xinyi District, Taipei, Taiwan. The building is similar in design to Salesforce West in San Francisco, California, United States and housed the corporate headquarters of Farglory Group before the completion of Farglory Financial Center in 2012.

== See also ==
- List of tallest buildings in Taiwan
- List of tallest buildings in Taipei
