= Russia–Taiwan relations =

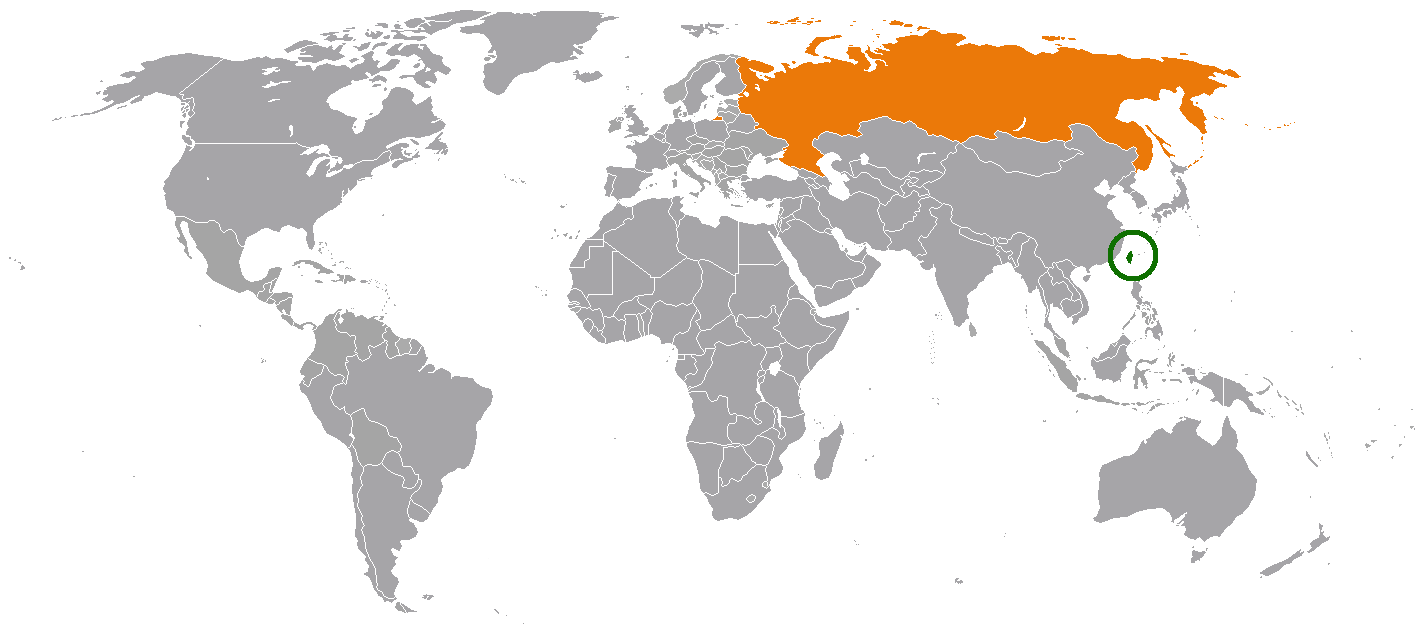
- Taiwan: Russia

Diplomatic mission
- Representative Office in Moscow for the Taipei-Moscow Economic and Cultural Coordination Commission: Representative Office in Taipei for the Moscow-Taipei Coordination Commission on Economic and Cultural Cooperation

Envoy
- Representative Lo Chin-Ru: Representative Yury Metelev

Russia and Taiwan do not currently have diplomatic relations, as Russia considers Taiwan to be an "inalienable" part of the People's Republic of China. However, unofficial relations have existed since the dissolution of the Soviet Union. Taiwan has maintained an office in Moscow since 1993 and Russia has operated an office in Taipei since 1996.

Relations deteriorated after the 2022 Russian invasion of Ukraine. Taiwan imposed sanctions against Russia, leading Russia to place Taiwan on its unfriendly countries and territories list.

== Historical relations ==
As a result of the Shimonoseki Treaty in 1895, which ended the Sino-Japanese War, Taiwan was transferred to Japan and was promptly made a Japanese colony. Foreign consulates resumed their activities on Formosa, 2 including Russian activities in 1896. The first Russian consul was the German native Paul Shabert. Both the Republic of China and the Soviet Union were the founding members of the United Nations and the Security Council in 1945.

After the end of the Korean War in 1954, the US signed a security treaty with the government of the Republic of China, which included a clause providing for American participation in military action in case of confrontation with mainland China. The Soviet Union minister of foreign affairs in a statement called the treaty a "rude violation of international agreements, sovereignty, and the territorial integrity of the PRC."

All contact between the Soviet Union and the Republic of China defined by the Sino-Soviet Treaty of Friendship and Alliance of 1945 was broken off. The announcement of the breakup was made on October 3, 1949, after the Soviet Union became the first country to recognize the PRC in October.

Although there have been some weak tendencies towards change in the status quo since the late 1950s, up to this day, the Russian Federation has had no official relations with Taiwan. It is worth mentioning that the Soviet Union had always adhered to the policy of "one China" but insisted on a political solution to deal with the crisis. Possibly, it was one of the reasons for the cooling of Sino Soviet relations at the end of the 1950s. When in September 1954 bombardment of the Taiwan-adjacent islands provoked the first of the three Matszu-Amoi crises, the Soviet Union in Nikita Khrushchev's statement officially announced its support of the PRC. At the same time, Foreign Minister Vyacheslav Molotov expressed concern that the regional conflict would turn into a major war, while accusing the United States of provoking the conflict. Not long before the crisis in 1954, ROC Navy captured a Soviet civilian oil tanker "Tuapse" in the high sea of Bashi Channel, which was on course from Odesa to Vladivostok. 49 crew were detained, whereas 29 were released in 1955, 9 moved to US and the others were imprisoned in various time frames till either died or finally released after 34 years in 1988. The Communist Party of the Soviet Union called for the Ten Nations Summit in New Delhi to discuss the issue on 27 September 1958 as one of the precursors of the later Sino-Soviet split.

With the Sino-Soviet split, Unofficial contact between the Soviet Union and Taiwan started at the 1960s such as the visits between Victor Louis, Chiang Ching-kuo and James Wei, after the tendency toward a US-PRC rapprochement had become obvious. While continuing to be committal to PRC's claim to be the sole representative of China, the Soviet Union stopped boycotting international organizations that excluded the PRC. Khrushchev additionally considered extending Soviet diplomatic recognition to Taiwan and refused to back Chinese efforts to take back Taiwan with military force.

The visits by Richard Nixon and Henry Kissinger resulted in the signing of the so-called Shanghai communiqué in 1972 when it was declared that the US "acknowledges that all Chinese on either side of the Taiwan Strait maintain there is but one China and that Taiwan is a part of China." Meanwhile, Taiwan hoped that a Soviet-Taiwanese rapprochement would prevent the rising number of China-American contacts. It is possible that the Soviet Union in its turn considered that restoration of relations with the ROC would help to slow down the aggravation in Soviet-PRC relations. Taiwan was eager to compromise since after the weakening of its relations with the US, it had little to lose. The Soviet Union, however, was very careful in its policy towards the ROC, trading with it via Hong Kong, Japan, West Germany, and its Eastern European allies.

== Current relations ==
Russia under President Boris Yeltsin moved to strengthen unofficial ties with Taiwan. In April 1992, former deputy prime minister Oleg Lobov met with Taiwanese Vice Foreign Minister Chiang Hsiao-yen. The two sides agreed to establish respective Economic and Cultural Coordination Commissions in Moscow and Taipei. Lobov lobbied Yeltsin to sign a degree with the effect in September 1992; this action was taken without consulting the rest of the Russian government or the Chinese embassy. The Chinese government called Russian Foreign Minister Andrei Kozyrev to demand the new commissions be considered "unofficial". On 15 September 1992, after concerns from the Foreign and Defense Ministries, the Foreign Intelligence Service and the State Duma, Yeltsin issued a decree emphasizing Russia's commitment to the "one China" policy and affirming the commissions were unofficial. In 1996, the Russian government opened an official in Taipei.

By 2002, the borders of Outer Mongolia were eliminated from the ROC boundary definition in which the Tuva Republic was incorporated in.

Over the past years, Russia has welcomed more than 300 Taiwanese students to work in the country, while Taiwan has allowed 200 Russian students. It is also said that around 1,000 Taiwanese visit Russia each year.

In 2022, Russia added Taiwan to the unfriendly countries and territories list. The Wall Street Journal reported in October 2024 that Elon Musk had been in regular contact with Russian President Vladimir Putin and other high-ranking Russian government officials since late 2022, discussing personal topics, business and geopolitical matters. The Journal reported that Putin had asked Musk to avoid activating the Starlink satellite system over Taiwan, to appease Chinese Communist Party general secretary Xi Jinping.

As of 2025, Taiwan is the largest importer of Russian naphtha. In mid-2025 it was reported that Taiwanese companies had purchased more than a billion dollars' worth of naphtha since 2024, becoming Russia's top export destination for that product. In January 2026, Sergei Shoigu stated that Russia supports China's position on Taiwan. In September 2026, Taiwanese officials stated that they believe Russia is assisting China's efforts to portray Japan as militaristic.

== Diplomatic missions ==
The ROC representative office in Russia, the Representative Office in Moscow for the Taipei-Moscow Economic and Cultural Coordination Commission, was opened on 12 July 1993 by the Ministry of Foreign Affairs of the ROC. The Russian representative office in Taiwan, Representative Office in Taipei for the Moscow-Taipei Coordination Commission on Economic and Cultural Cooperation, was opened on 15 December 1996 by the Ministry of Foreign Affairs of Russia.

== See also ==
- Economy of Taiwan
- Foreign relations of Taiwan
- Cold War
- Capture of Tanker Tuapse
