= Farglory Financial Center =

Office building in Taipei, Taiwan

Farglory Financial Center 遠雄金融中心
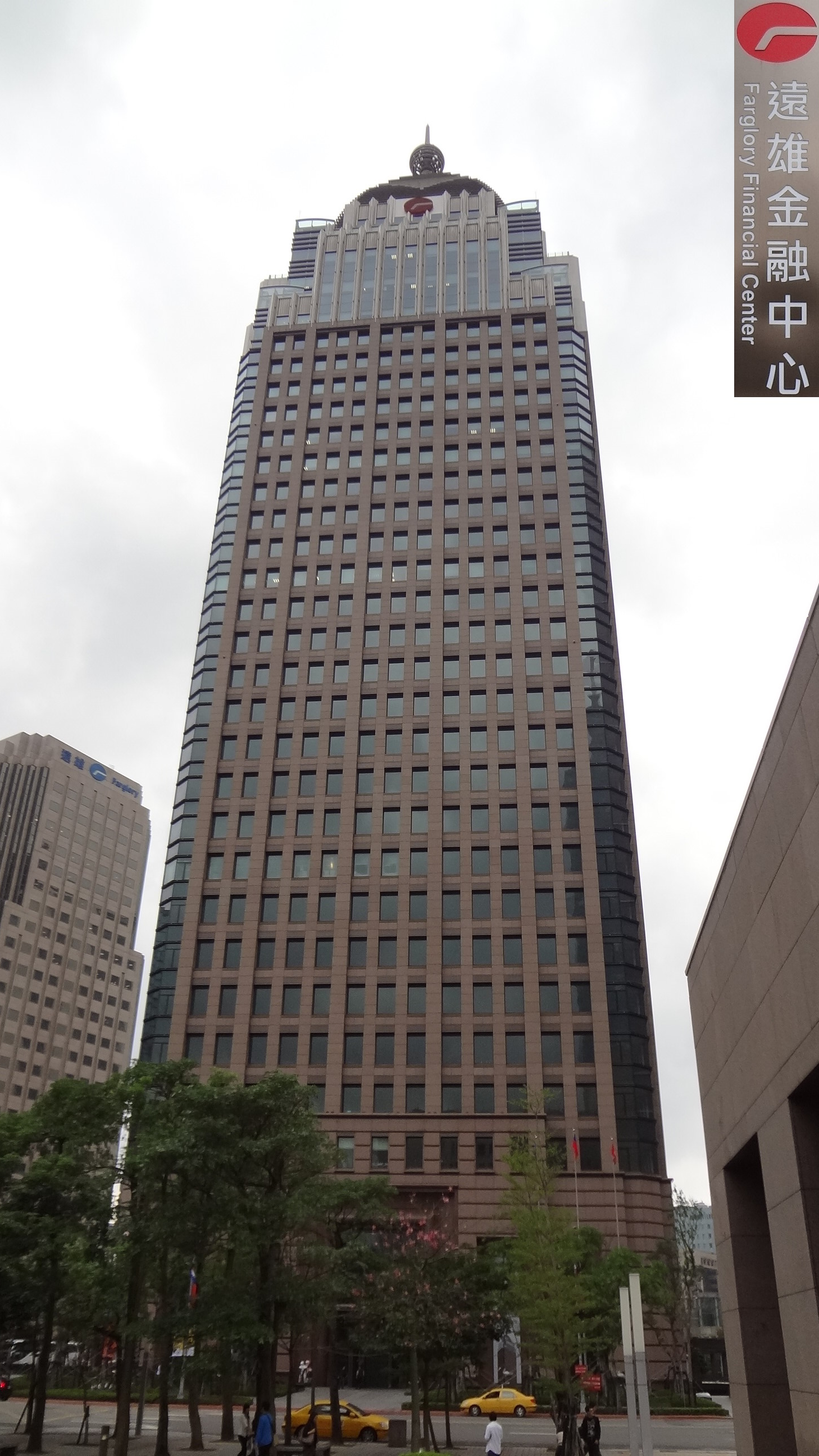
- Interactive map of the Farglory Financial Center 遠雄金融中心 area

General information
- Status: Completed
- Type: Office building
- Location: Xinyi, Taipei, Taiwan
- Coordinates: 25°2′23″N 121°33′51.3″E
- Construction started: Jun 30, 2010
- Completed: Sep 25, 2012

Height
- Tip: 208 Metre
- Roof: 164.5 Metre

Technical details
- Floor count: 32
- Floor area: 61,147.58m^{2}

Design and construction
- Architect: Chu-Yuan Lee

The Farglory Financial Center (Chinese: 遠雄金融中心) is a skyscraper located in Xinyi District, Taipei, Taiwan. It is the eighth tallest building in Taiwan and the fourth tallest in Xinyi Special District (after Taipei 101, Taipei Nan Shan Plaza and Cathay Landmark). The height of the building is 208 m (682 ft), the floor area is 61,147.58 m^{2} (658,187.1 sq ft), and it comprises 32 floors above ground, as well as 4 basement levels.

== See also ==
- List of tallest buildings in Taiwan
- Xinyi Special District
- Farglory International Center
