= Philippines–Taiwan relations =

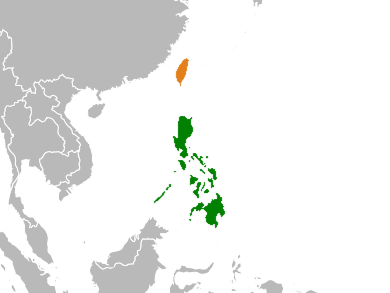

- Philippines: Taiwan

Diplomatic mission
- Taipei Economic and Cultural Office in the Philippines: Manila Economic and Cultural Office

The bilateral foreign relations between the Republic of the Philippines and Republic of China (Taiwan) are a subject of China–Philippines relations. Among other issues between the two are the South China Sea dispute and the political status of Taiwan.

Since 1975, the Philippines recognized the People's Republic of China as the sole legitimate authority of "China", but maintains unofficial relations with Taiwan through the Manila Economic and Cultural Office in Taipei and Taipei Economic and Cultural Office in Manila.

== History ==
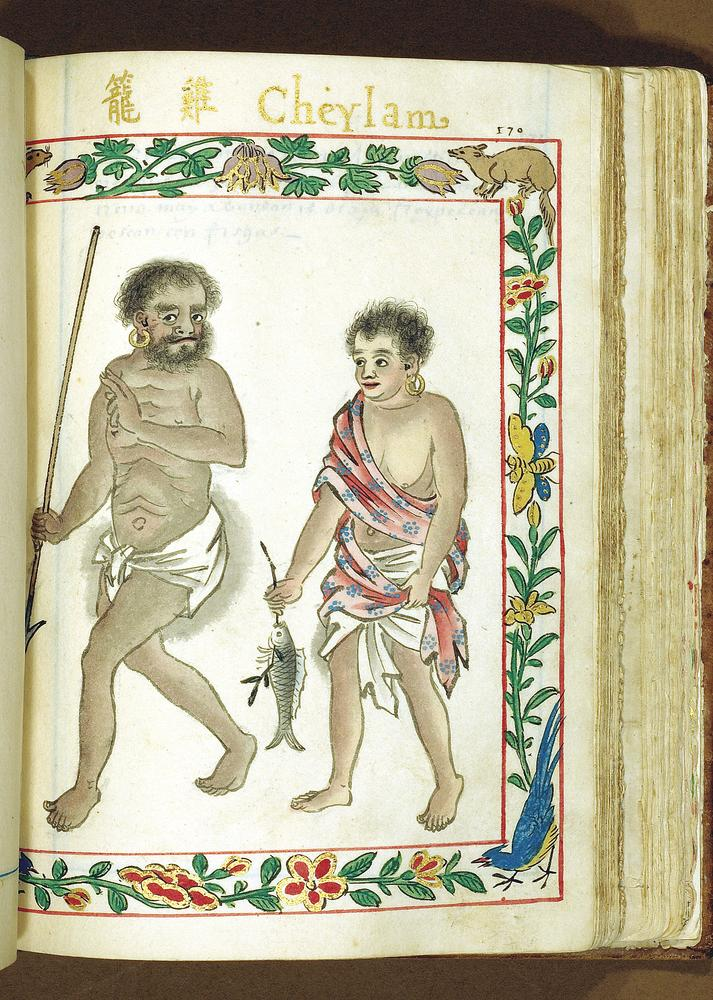
Taiwanese Aboriginals from Keelung in the Philippines, c. 1590 in Boxer Codex

The Changbin culture (長濱文化) in Taiwan, dated to be around 10,000 years old, is believed to have originated from either the Philippines or southeast China, according to recent analysis. The archaeological discovery yielded a grave site and 40,000 tools and tool fragments made of stone, shell and bone. It is believed that the people responsible for the site are of Negrito ancestry, whose ethnic groups are still scattered in the Philippines and other areas in Southeast Asia.

Later, Austronesian peoples who came to Taiwan migrated southward to the Philippines. In some case, a back-migration to Taiwan also occurred, further diversifying the genetic relationship and flow of peoples between Taiwan and the Philippines. Aboriginal peoples in Taiwan and many ethnic groups in the Philippines made intensive trade networks, of which a prime focus is the jade maritime road, which played a major role in trade relations for at least 2,500 years between 4,000 years ago until the Iron Age began roughly 500 years into the Common Era. Raw jade was mined in Taiwan and was processed extensively in the Philippines, then traded throughout east and southeast Asia. This jade trade route, which began between Taiwan and the Philippines, also branched towards Borneo, Vietnam, Cambodia, and peninsular Thailand, becoming "one of the most extensive sea-based trade networks of a single geological material in the prehistoric world." The Philippines also produced and exported wrought iron into Taiwan in 400AD.

By the 10th century, a new trade route was established between the Philippines, southern Taiwan, the Penghu islands, and Quanzhou in China. The 12th century saw the rise of the Pisheye (Visaya), who raided the southern coasts of China, and were believed to have rested at the Straight in Taiwan's shores. When Spain colonized Manila in the 16th century, Spanish Philippines managed to control northern Taiwan for a time, called Spanish Formosa, until the Dutch arrived.

In 1662, Ming dynasty loyalist Koxinga who defeated the Dutch, controlled sections of Taiwan and later attempted to colonize the Philippines, but died before he could prepare an invasion. He also planned to conquer China, in favor of the Ming dynasty, but before the invasion, the Ming was defeated by the newly installed Qing dynasty.

During the rise of the Republic of China and against the Qing Dynasty, the first President of the Republic of China, Sun Yat-sen, had a deep friendship with the Filipino reformer and revolutionary, Mariano Ponce.

The Philippines officially recognized the Republic of China as the sole representative of China in the past. Formal diplomatic relations were ended with the establishment of formal relations between the Philippines and the People's Republic of China on June 9, 1975. During the time that the two countries had formal relations, the Philippines allowed the Republic of China to direct and manage all the Chinese schools in the country. When formal diplomatic relationship ended, the Philippines decided to take over in managing the Chinese schools. As of now, the People's Republic of China has no intervention of local Chinese schools, except for bilaterial partnerships.

However, the two countries established representative offices as de facto embassies, with Taiwan informally represented by the Pacific Economic and Cultural Center in Manila and the Philippines by the Asian Exchange Center in Taipei. On December 17, 1987, Philippine president Corazon Aquino issued Executive Order No. 313 prohibiting Filipino government officials to visit Taiwan and restricting the welcoming of a Taiwanese delegation in official functions.

In December 1989, the Pacific Economic and Cultural Center was renamed the Taipei Economic and Cultural Office in the Philippines and the Asian Exchange Center was renamed the Manila Economic and Cultural Office.

In August 2016, Taiwan's new government, headed by Tsai Ing-wen since May 2016, announced its New Southbound Policy shall focus on relations with the Philippines. Among the focal points for the Taiwan-Philippines cooperations are trade and investment, agriculture, fisheries, aquaculture, SMEs, ICT, climate change, education, and culture. The new policy was welcomed by the newly elected government in 2016, amidst the new government's policy to pivot towards mainland China.

In 2017, the Philippines and Taiwan inked an updated investment deal in Makati, the Philippines' financial hub. The deal expanded to include the financial sector, infrastructure, and intellectual property of the two countries, far from a similar agreement in 1992 that only included the manufacturing sector. The two sides also signed six other deals as part of ministerial trade and economic consultations, including memoranda of understanding on "green" energy, insurance industry supervision, and professional training. The PRC government filed protests against the Philippines to stop the agreements, nonetheless, the agreements were signed on schedule. A poll in 2017 noted a huge increase in Filipino support towards Taiwanese independence from mainland China. The Philippines also supports the membership of Taiwan in UNESCO, in recognition of Taiwan's holistic conservation of heritage sites.

In January 2018, Taiwan provided aid to the Philippines to rehabilitate war-torn Marawi in Mindanao. Taiwan also sent its legislative speaker and numerous parliamentarians to the Philippines to further promote parliamentary exchanges and relations between the two nations. A recent survey found that a majority of the population of the Philippines supports Taiwanese independence.

In recent years, the Philippines has shifted from a passive role into an active role in the Indo-Pacific alliance to prevent or minimize a PRC-ROC conflict in the region. Both Taiwan and the Philippines have exchanged military intel in regards to escalatory movements by the PRC.

In April 2025, President Bongbong Marcos's eased the 1987 executive order by the first Aquino administration easing the restrictions of Filipino officials visiting Taiwan.

== Bilateral relation ==
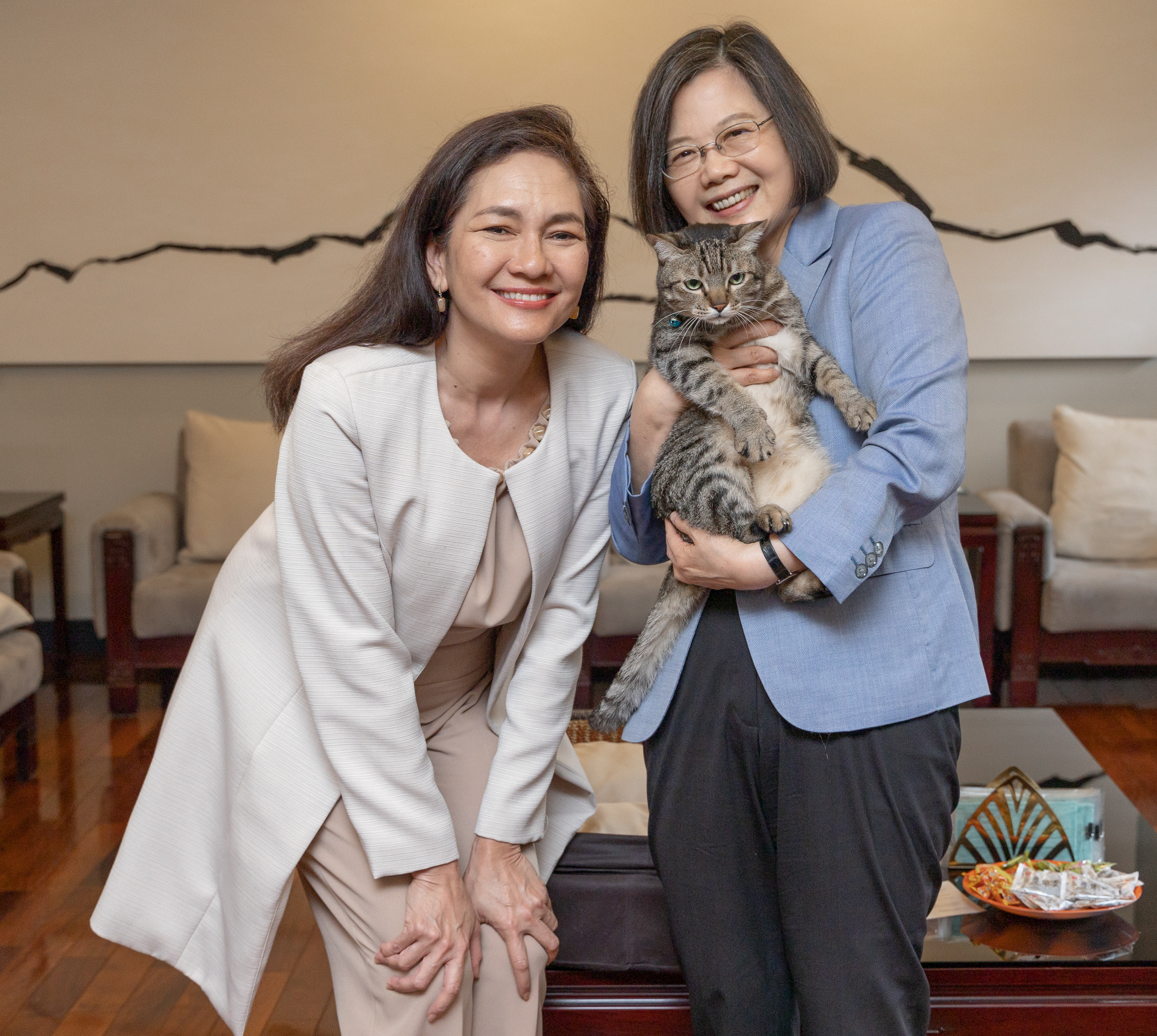
Philippine Senator Risa Hontiveros with Former Taiwanese President Tsai Ing-wen and Tsai's pet cat Think Think during the senator's visit to Taipei in May 2023

The Philippines and Taiwan, traditionally, were not separate entities, but instead were linked through the jade trade route between the two areas. The current separation is of the two areas is widely viewed by scholars as an artifact of modern colonialism, Han settlement, and historical contingency.

The strong Taiwanese economy, particularly in the manufacturing industries, attracts cheap manual labor from the Philippines. Most Filipinos working in Taiwan work as factory workers, domestic workers, construction workers, fishermen and professionals, and they send a large part of their earnings to their families in the Philippines. Many Taiwanese men have also chosen Filipino women as brides through arranged marriages. An estimated 7,000 Filipino women now live there with their Taiwanese husbands. Filipino laborers in Taiwan are usually vulnerable to exploitation by their employers, a situation common to unskilled migrant workers all over the world. The Taiwanese government has been receptive to the cases involving mistreatment of Filipino workers in Taiwan. Filipino migrant caretakers in Taiwan have to go through a broker system that collects most of their monthly earnings, demands long work hours without overtime pay, and offers no days off. Some caretakers have to work for 24 hours a day. Home caretakers typically receive monthly salaries much lower than the standard set by the government because they are not covered by Taiwan's Labor Standards Act. Labor Rights for the Filipino workers have been recently improved in a very substantial manners by the Taiwanese government by pressuring their employers to offer increased wages. Nowadays, a high portion of Filipinos residing in Taiwan receive higher amount of wages in comparison with the local Taiwanese residents and the Taiwanese government has been providing excellent quality education to all Filipino children residing in the country.

Taiwan-Philippines bilateral trade volume reached US$12 billion in 2013. In 2013, Taiwan's export to the Philippines totaled US$9.78 billion while Taiwan's import from the Philippines reached a total of US$2.2 billion. In 2014, the Philippines was the 8th largest export and the 25th largest import partner to Taiwan, whereas Taiwan was the 9th largest export and 3rd largest import partner for the Philippines. Meanwhile, Taiwan was also the 7th largest foreign investor in the Philippines for Taiwan in 2014. According to Taipei Economic and Cultural Office in the Philippines (TECO) in 2023, Taiwan targets to "attract at least 300,000 Filipino tourists" while seeking to encourage 200,000 Taiwanese tourists to travel to the Philippines. In 2014, there were more than 100,000 Filipino workers and migrants in Taiwan. The annual remittance from Filipino workers in Taiwan amounted to more than US$100 million. The air-links between Taipei/Kaohsiung and Manila are daily operated by China Airlines, Eva Air, Philippine Airlines, and Cebu Pacific Air. The mutual interactions and exchanges in other areas like culture, education, agriculture and aquaculture are vibrant.

Filipinos enjoy a visa-waiver from entering Taiwan for tourism and business purposes up to 14 days. This took effect 1 November 2017 and due to expire 31 July 2018 but was extended until 31 July 2019. Prior to this, Filipinos need to secure a Travel Authorization Certificate or E-visa before traveling to Taiwan. Taiwanese visitors on the other hand need to secure an E-visa before traveling to the Philippines through MECO.

In 2023, opposition Senator Risa Hontiveros of the Philippines visited Taiwan and met with the Taiwanese president to affirm the bilateral ties of both countries. In 2024, the Philippine president congratulated the election victory of Taiwan's new president, sparking backlash from Beijing. Hontiveros has warned Beijing of its undiplomatic statements, and echoed the need for the Philippines to review the "One-China policy", noting that Beijing has done more harm to the Philippines compared to a Filipino leader's congratulatory remark to Taiwan. China's foreign ministry spokesperson Guo Jiakun warned the Philippines of their "wrongful and provocative" actions on the Taiwan issue. In September 2025, the Philippines built a military base near Taiwan. In August 2026, Bongbong Marcos said the Philippines would not allow its territory to be used to launch attacks on Taiwan and wanted to stay out of any regional conflict.

== Economic relations ==
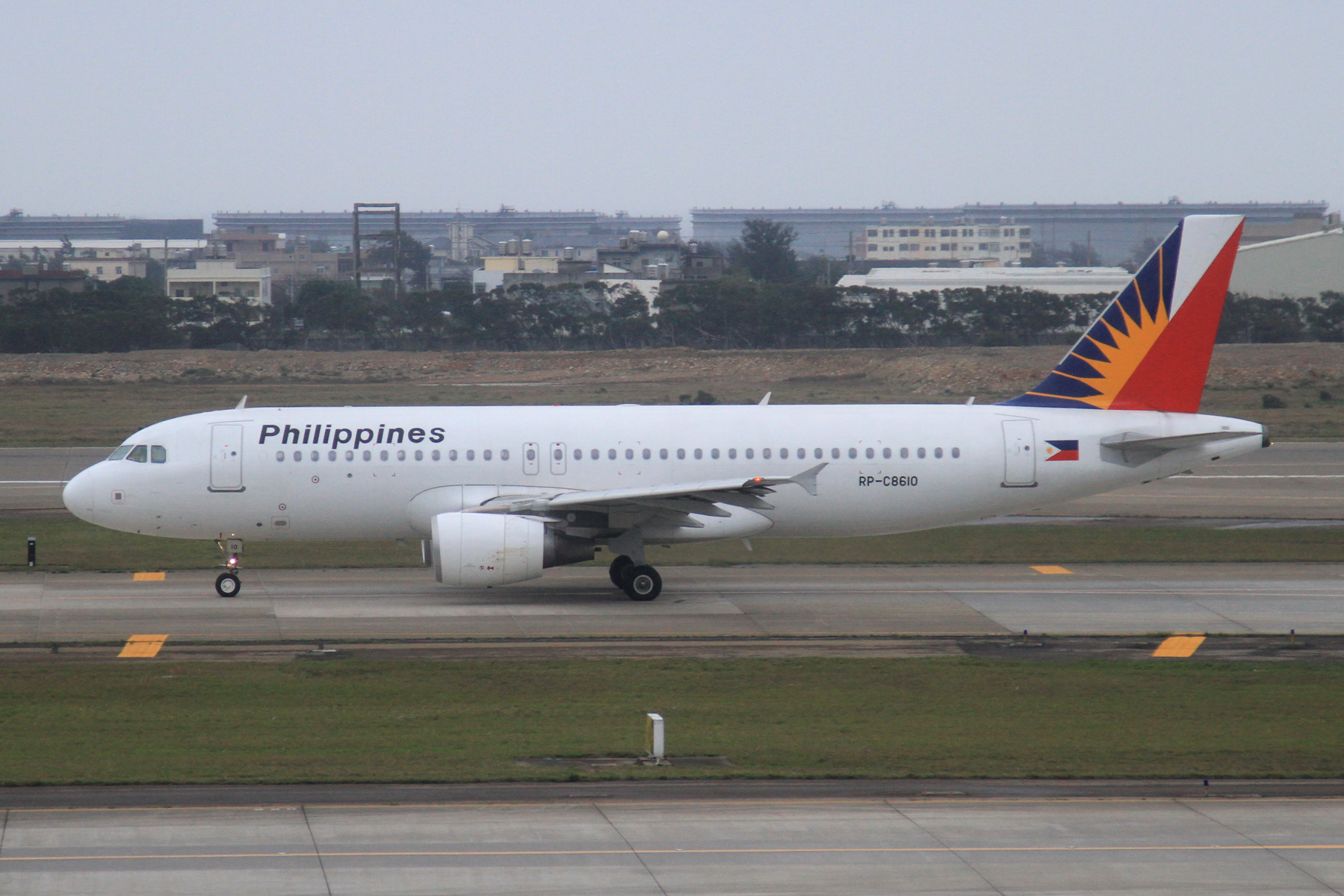
Philippine Airlines aircraft in Taiwan

The total investment amount between the Philippines and Taiwan in 2023 reached up to US$73.34 billion. Taiwan was the 8th largest foreign investor in the Philippines at the time.

The number of Filipino tourists visiting Taiwan peaked at 350,490 in 2023, growing from 172,000 in 2016 and making the Philippines Taiwans 9th largest tourist market at the time.

In 2021, approximately 1,200 memorandums of understanding were signed between Taiwanese and Filipino universities.

The amount of Filipino workers in Taiwan reached 150,000 in 2023, growing from 78,000 in 2016.

- Philippine exports to Taiwan: US$2.06 billion
- Philippine imports from Taiwan: US$5.06 billion

== Others ==
As of December 2016, there were 136,400 overseas Filipino contract workers in the entire island as per official count of Taiwan's Workforce Development Agency (WDA) of the Ministry of Labor (MOL). Philippine holidays such as Independence day and José Rizal's birthday are also celebrated by the Filipino community in Taiwan. Taiwanese tourists in the Philippines for the period of January to December 2016 reached 231,801.

== Disputes ==
=== Batanes and EEZ between the Philippines and Taiwan ===
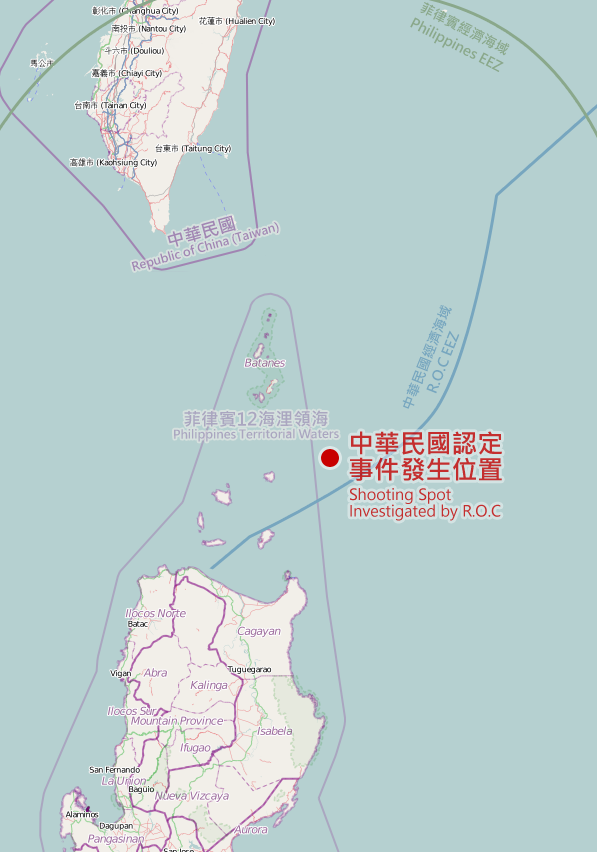
The red spot is the location of the incident, where mainland Taiwanese fishers were found poaching within Philippine EEZ. The islands at the west of the red dot are land territories of the Philippines, while the nearest Taiwanese land territory is 5 times farther than the nearest Philippine land.

Various local oral histories from Orchid Island (Taiwan) and Batanes (Philippines) note that the people from Orchid Island originated from Batanes, and many of their villages were founded by the Ivatan people of Batanes in northern Philippines. Later, the indigenous people of Orchid Island developed into the Tao people. Various commodities such as yam, as well as cultural traditions such as goldsmithing were imported by the Ivatan people towards the Tao people. Sea voyages and trade ended 300 years ago due to isolated cases of conflict, where the most notably incident was when a Tao killed 6 Ivatans in Batanes. The end of trade later became permanent upon the colonization of the islands by different colonial governments, namely the Chinese on one side and the Spanish on the other side. Trade contacts were only reinvigorated by the last years of the 20th century, after the governor of Batanes and the island chief of Orchid Island signed a friendly non-binding declaration in 1998 affirming the kinship between the two indigenous sides and pledging to maintain future exchanges, including the “reestablishment of historical sea routes”.

On 23 December 2007, conflict began between the Philippines and Taiwan after Taiwan Times published an article written by Chen Hurng-yu, stating that Taiwan has claims on Batanes. The article claimed that the Philippines has allegedly "weak claim" over the country's northernmost province, while stating that the Philippines has control over it. The article also encouraged the Taiwanese government to take over the Philippine-controlled islands, which was first claimed by Spanish Philippines in 1783 and later incorporated and administered by the Philippines without any contesting nation in the 18th century.

On 9 May 2013, a Taiwanese boat from mainland Taiwan refused to leave waters closer to the Philippines despite multiple Filipino diplomatic calls towards the Taiwanese side to leave. The stand-off later made the Philippine Coast Guard to open fire on the Taiwanese fishing boat, killing one fisherman. The Philippine government following the incident claimed that the shooting took place in their territorial waters. Following the incident, Taiwan imposed sanctions on the Philippines, including the freeze of Filipino hires. The Taiwanese Coast Guard later conducted rhythmic patrolling in the waters, triggering the Philippine Coast Guard to send patrols as well. On August 7, Filipino authorities recommended homicide charges against the coast guard personnel involved. On August 8, to normalize ties between the two sides, a Filipino envoy apologized to the victim's family, resulting to Taiwan's lifting of sanctions.

In 2015, another Taiwanese fishing vessel from mainland Taiwan entered Filipino waters, triggering the Philippine coast guard vessel to pursue it. The incident ended when the Taiwanese fishing vessel was successfully chased away by the Philippine coast guard away from Filipino waters. A Taiwanese coast guard vessel arrived as well. Before the 2015 incident, the two sides were trying to formalize a fishing pact to resolve fishing disputes, including a commitment not to use force, and procedures on the detention and release of any fishing vessels or fishermen. In May 2019, the Philippines constructed Filipino fishermen shelters on Mavulis Island, the northernmost island of the Philippines, to aid Filipino fishermen stranded during storms and to safeguard the area from poachers and illegal fishermen coming from foreign lands. Majority of poachers in the area come from Taiwan and China. In September 2019, the officers involved in the 2013 incident between the two sides were convicted by court, ending the 7-year row. Relations between the two sides fully normalized and improved after the election of the Democratic Progressive Party to the Taiwanese presidency.

In 2026, the Tao people of Orchid Island formally made their first ocean voyage in more than 300 years from their island to meet the Ivatan people of Batanes through traditional boat travel. The move was welcomed by the Ivatans of Batanes, and a similar voyage was also planned towards Orchid Island.

=== Other parts of the South China Sea ===
An estimated US$3.37 trillion worth of global trade passes through the South China Sea annually, which accounts for a third of the global maritime trade, 80 percent of China's energy imports and 40 percent of its trade. Claimant states are interested in retaining or acquiring the rights to fishing stocks, the exploration and potential exploitation of crude oil and natural gas in the seabed, and the maritime security of important shipping lanes.

Claims to the region were not seriously made until the 19th or the early 20th century. Taiwan occupies the largest feature, Taiping Island, in the Spratly chain, parts of which are also claimed by the Philippines. By the 1970s, both claimants had militarily occupied one or more of the islands. In 2015, the Philippines held eight outposts while Taiwan retained one. The Philippines and Vietnam were the most active in building artificial islands in the area before China's construction activity outpaced them.

On 12 July 2016, the historical and internationally-binding South China Sea Arbitration, organized under the United Nations Convention on the Law of the Sea (UNCLOS), rejected certain forms of Chinese claims, notably the maritime claims of China, within the so-called nine-dash line, which the court effectively invalidated. It did not rule on matters of territorial sovereignty since that is not part of the court's scope. (Note: "PCA Case Nº 2013-19 in the Matter of the South China Sea Arbitration". 12 July 2016. pp. 1–479. – Section V(F)(d)(264, 266, 267), p. 113.) (Note: "PCA Case Nº 2013-19 in the Matter of the South China Sea Arbitration". 12 July 2016. pp. 1–479. – Section V(F)(d)(278), p. 117.) As of November 2023, 27 governments had called for the ruling to be respected, including the Philippines, the United States, Japan, South Korea, Vietnam, Indonesia, Malaysia, the United Kingdom, and France. It was rejected by eight governments, including China (PRC), Taiwan (ROC), and North Korea.

== Diplomats ==
=== ROC Representatives to the Philippines ===
- Gary Lin (2014–present)
- Wu Hsin-hsing (2003–2008)

=== ROC Ambassadors to the Philippines ===
- Han Lih-wu (1964–1968)
