= Taipei Economic and Cultural Office, Manila =

Taipei Economic and Cultural Office in the Philippines 駐菲律賓臺北經濟文化辦事處 Opisinang Pang-Ekonomiya at Pangkultura ng Taipei sa Pilipinas

Agency overview
- Formed: 1975 (as Pacific Economic and Cultural Center); 1989 (as Taipei Economic and Cultural Office)
- Jurisdiction: Philippines (Diplomatic mission of Taiwan)
- Headquarters: Makati, Metro Manila
- Deputy Ministers responsible: Dustin Yang; Michael Li
- Agency executive: Wallace Chow, Representative
- Website: Taipei Economic and Cultural Office in the Philippines

The Taipei Economic and Cultural Office in the Philippines (Chinese: 駐菲律賓臺北經濟文化辦事處) represents the interests of Taiwan in the Philippines, functioning as a de facto embassy in the absence of diplomatic relations. Its Philippine counterpart is the Manila Economic and Cultural Office in Taipei.

It was first established in 1975 as the Pacific Economic and Cultural Center Manila Office (Chinese: 太平洋經濟文化中心駐馬尼拉辦事處), replacing the former Republic of China Embassy. In 1984, its staff acquired diplomatic privileges and immunity, as did those of its Philippine counterpart, then known as the Asian Exchange Center. It adopted its present name in March 1990.

== Representatives ==
- Gary Lin (23 September 2014-)
- Wu Hsin-hsing (2003–2008)

== See also ==
- Taipei Economic and Cultural Representative Office
- Manila Economic and Cultural Office
- Philippines–Taiwan relations
