= Manila Economic and Cultural Office =

Representative office of the Philippines in Taiwan

Manila Economic and Cultural Office Philippine Representative Office in Taiwan
- 馬尼拉經濟文化辦事處
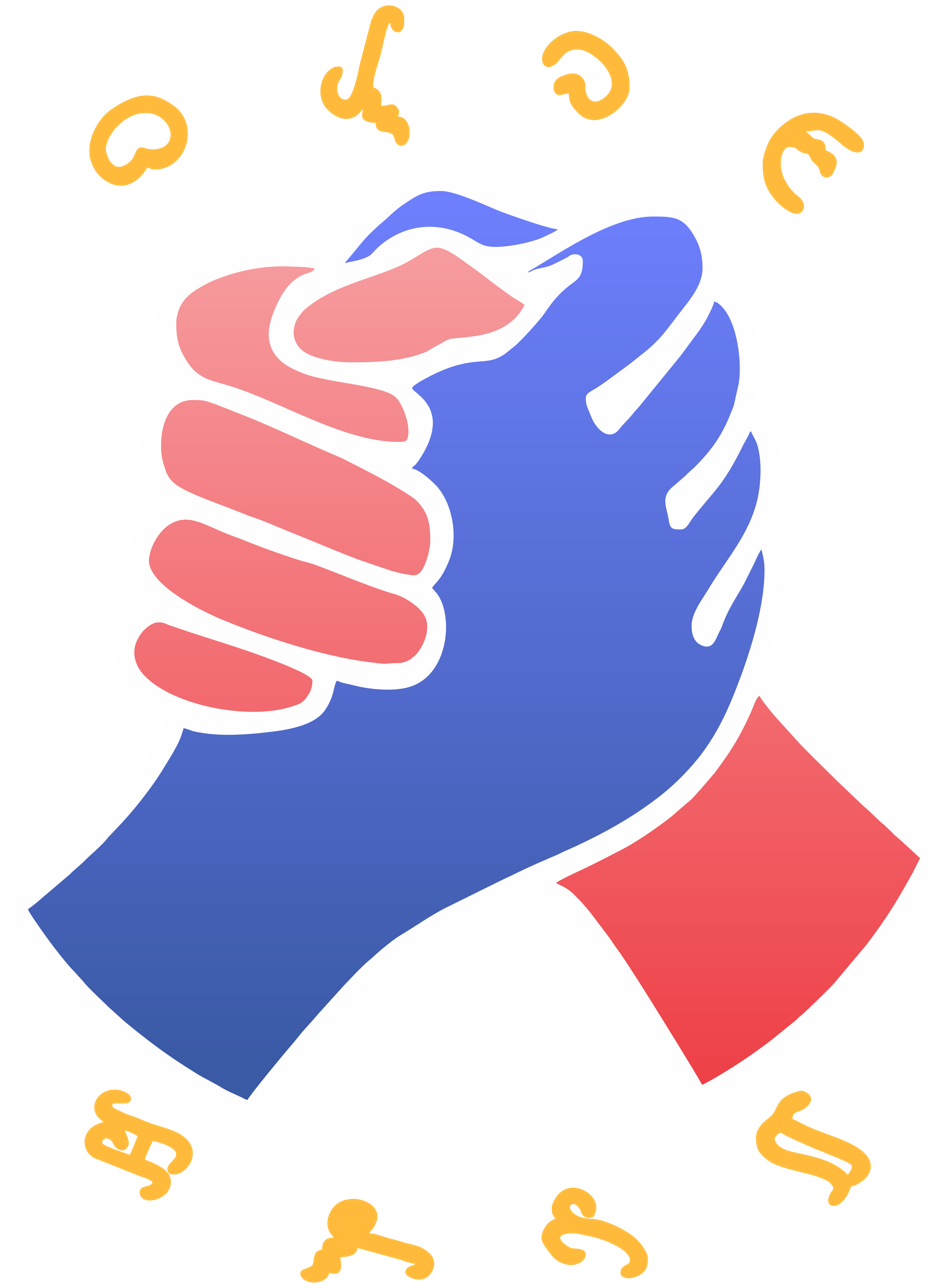

Agency overview
- Formed: 1975 (as Asian Exchange Center); 1989 (as Manila Economic and Cultural Office)
- Jurisdiction: Republic of China (Taiwan)
- Headquarters: 2F, Chang Hong New Era Building 55 & 57 Zhouzi Street Neihu District Taipei, Taiwan
- Agency executive: Corazon Padiernos, Chairperson and Resident Representative
- Website: Manila Economic and Cultural Office

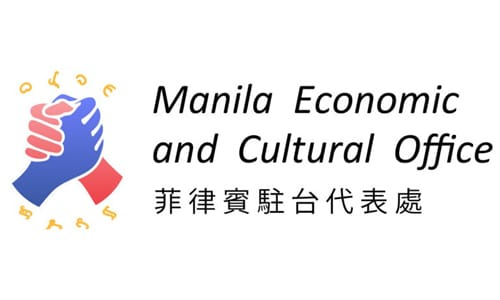
The Logotype of the office

The Manila Economic and Cultural Office (MECO) (Note: In Chinese: 馬尼拉經濟文化辦事處; pinyin: Mǎnílā Jīngjì Wénhuà Bànshì Chù. In Tagalog: Tanggapang Pang-ekonomiya at Pangkultura ng Maynila. Also known as the Philippine Representative Office in Taiwan Chinese: 菲律賓駐臺代表處; pinyin: Fēilǜbīn Zhù Tái Dàibiǎo Chù; Tagalog: Tanggapan ng Kinatawan ng Pilipinas sa Taiwan.), also known as the Philippine Representative Office in Taiwan, is the representative office of the Philippines in Taiwan, functioning as a de facto embassy in the absence of diplomatic relations. It is a non-stock, non-profit corporation organized under Philippine law.

It was first established in 1975 as the Asian Exchange Center, replacing the former Philippine Embassy. In 1984, its staff acquired diplomatic privileges and immunity, as did those of its Taiwanese counterpart in Manila, then known as the Pacific Economic and Cultural Center. It adopted its present name in March 1990.

In addition to its Taipei Office, it also maintains Extension Offices in Kaohsiung and Taichung.

Its counterpart body in the Philippines is the Taipei Economic and Cultural Office in Manila.

In September 2025, Corazon Padiernos was designated as Officer in Charge and Resident Representative of the office, after Cheloy Garafil was elected as Secretary General of the House of Representatives of the Philippines.

== List of chair and resident representative ==
List of Chair and Resident Representative (1989–present):

- Rafael Alunan III (1989–1992)
- Carlos C. Salinas (1992–1995)
- Alfredo Yao (1995–2000)
- Eddie M. Garcia (2000–2005)
- Amadeo R. Perez Jr. (2005–2010)
- Antonio Basilio (2010–2016)
- Lito Banayo (2016–2022)
- Silvestre Bello III (2022–2024)
- Cheloy Garafil (2024–2025)
- Corazon Padiernos (2025–present)

== See also ==
- Philippines–Taiwan relations
- List of diplomatic missions in Taiwan
- List of diplomatic missions of the Philippines
