= Falkland Islands Government Office, London =

Falkland Islands representative office in London

Coordinates: 51°29′57.0″N 0°7′59.7″W

Falkland Islands Government Office
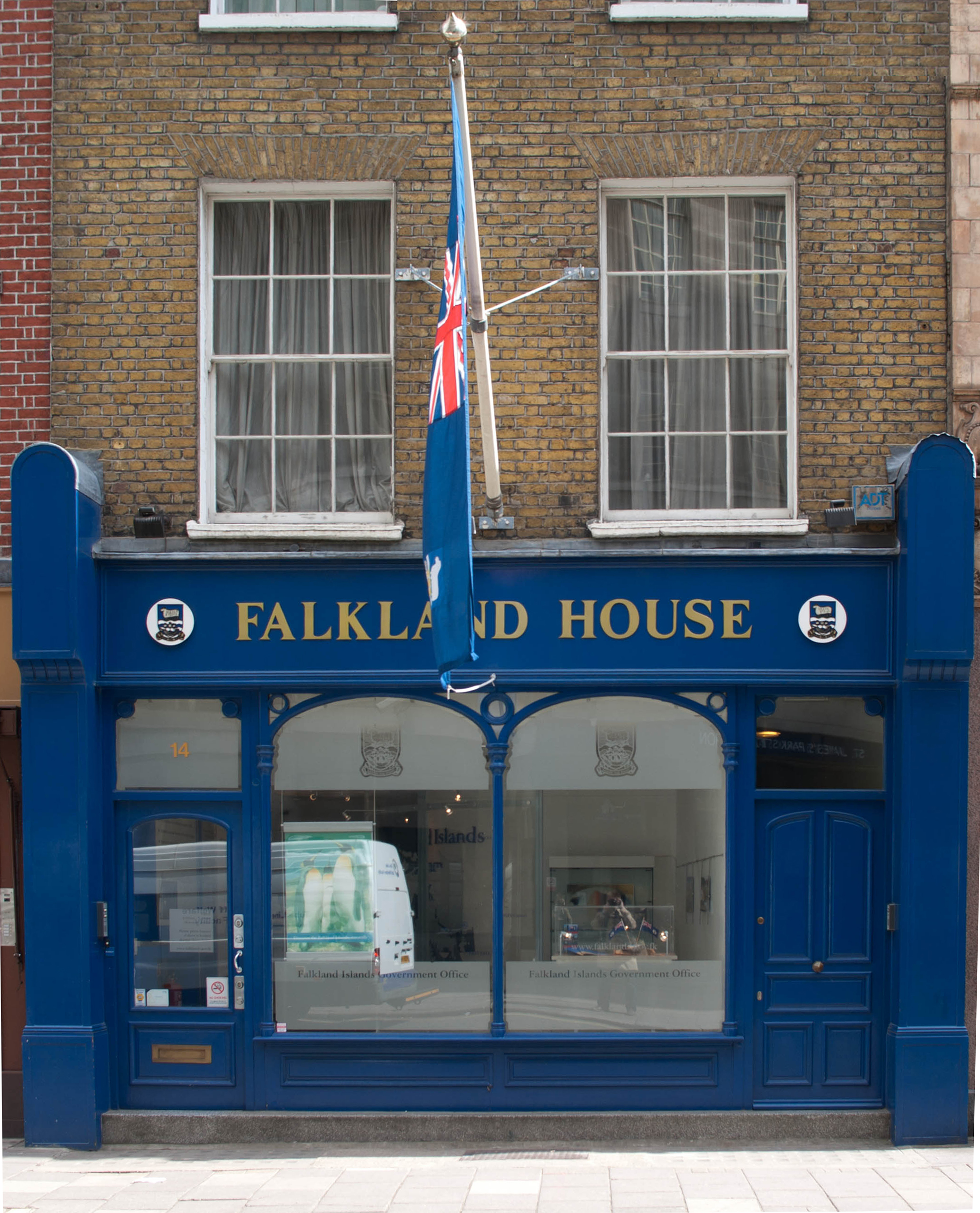

Agency overview
- Jurisdiction: United Kingdom
- Headquarters: 14 Broadway, London, SW1H 0BH
- Agency executive: Richard Hyslop, Representative
- Parent agency: Falkland Islands Government
- Website: London Office Falkland Islands Government

The Falkland Islands Government Office in London is the representative office of the British Overseas Territory of the Falkland Islands in the United Kingdom, also referred to as Falkland House. It was opened in 1983, one year after the Falklands War. As well as representing the Falkland Islands government in the UK, they provide assistance to their residents travelling to the UK for medical reasons.

== History ==
Following the British victory in the Falklands War over Argentina, a year after the Falkland Islands Government opened an official office in London. The office relocated a number of times before arriving at its permanent location on Broadway in the City of Westminster in 1989. It acts as a de facto embassy for the Falkland Islands to the United Kingdom. The office is the location where civilians wishing to visit the Falkland Islands can book flights there. The office was one of the founder members of the United Kingdom Overseas Territories Association in 1994, which later grew to include representation from all of the British Overseas Territories except for Bermuda and the Pitcairn Islands. The Falkland Islands Government Office also conventionally hosts visits from Governor-Designates of the Falkland Islands as well as nominated British Ambassadors to Argentina before they take up their postings. Members of the Legislative Assembly of the Falkland Islands also attend the Falkland Islands Government Office to assist with promoting the Falkland Islands.
