= De facto embassy =

Organisation that serves as an unofficial embassy

A de facto embassy is an office or organisation that serves de facto as an embassy in the absence of normal or official diplomatic relations among countries, usually to represent nations which lack full diplomatic recognition, regions or dependencies of countries, or territories over which sovereignty is disputed. In some cases, diplomatic immunity and extraterritoriality may be granted.

Alternatively, states which have broken off direct bilateral ties will be represented by an "interests section" of another embassy, belonging to a third country that has agreed to serve as a protecting power and is recognised by both states. When relations are exceptionally tense, such as during a war, the interests section is staffed by diplomats from the protecting power. For example, when Iraq and the U.S. broke diplomatic relations due to the Gulf War, Poland became the protecting power for the United States. The United States Interests Section of the Polish Embassy in Iraq was headed by a Polish diplomat. However, if the host country agrees, an interests section may be staffed by diplomats from the sending country. From 1977 to 2015, the United States Interests Section in Havana was staffed by Americans, even though it was formally a section of the Swiss Embassy to Cuba.

Governments of states not recognized by the receiving state and of territories that make no claim to be sovereign states may set up offices abroad that do not have official diplomatic status as defined by the Vienna Convention. Examples include the Taipei Economic and Cultural Representative Offices; Somaliland's Representative Offices in London, Addis Ababa, Rome, and Washington, D.C.; the Hong Kong Economic and Trade Offices that represent the government of that territory; and Bermuda House, Falkland House and Gibraltar House in London, representing the three dependent territories in their "motherland". Such offices assume some of the non-diplomatic functions of diplomatic posts, such as promoting trade interests and providing assistance to its citizens and residents. They are nevertheless not diplomatic missions, their personnel are not diplomats and do not have diplomatic visas, although there may be legislation providing for personal immunities and tax privileges, as in the case of the Hong Kong offices in London and Toronto, for example.

== Taiwan ==
Diplomatic relations between world states and the Republic of China today Republic of China (ROC, Taiwan) People's Republic of China (PRC, Mainland China) Countries recognizing PRC only, having no relation with ROC Countries recognizing PRC only, but keeping an informal relation, or set the de facto embassy mutually with MFA of ROC or legislated significant series of laws Countries recognizing Government of ROC only

=== Foreign missions in Taiwan ===
Many countries maintain formal diplomatic relations with the People's Republic of China but operate unofficial "trade missions" or "representative offices" in Taipei to deal with Taiwan-related commercial and consular issues. Often, these delegations may forward visa applications to their nearest embassy or consulate rather than processing them locally.

When the United States recognized the People's Republic of China as the sole legitimate entity of "China" in 1979, it established a non-governmental body known as the American Institute in Taiwan to serve its interests on the island. By contrast, other countries were represented by privately operated bodies; the United Kingdom was informally represented by the "Anglo-Taiwan Trade Committee", while France was similarly represented by a "Trade Office".

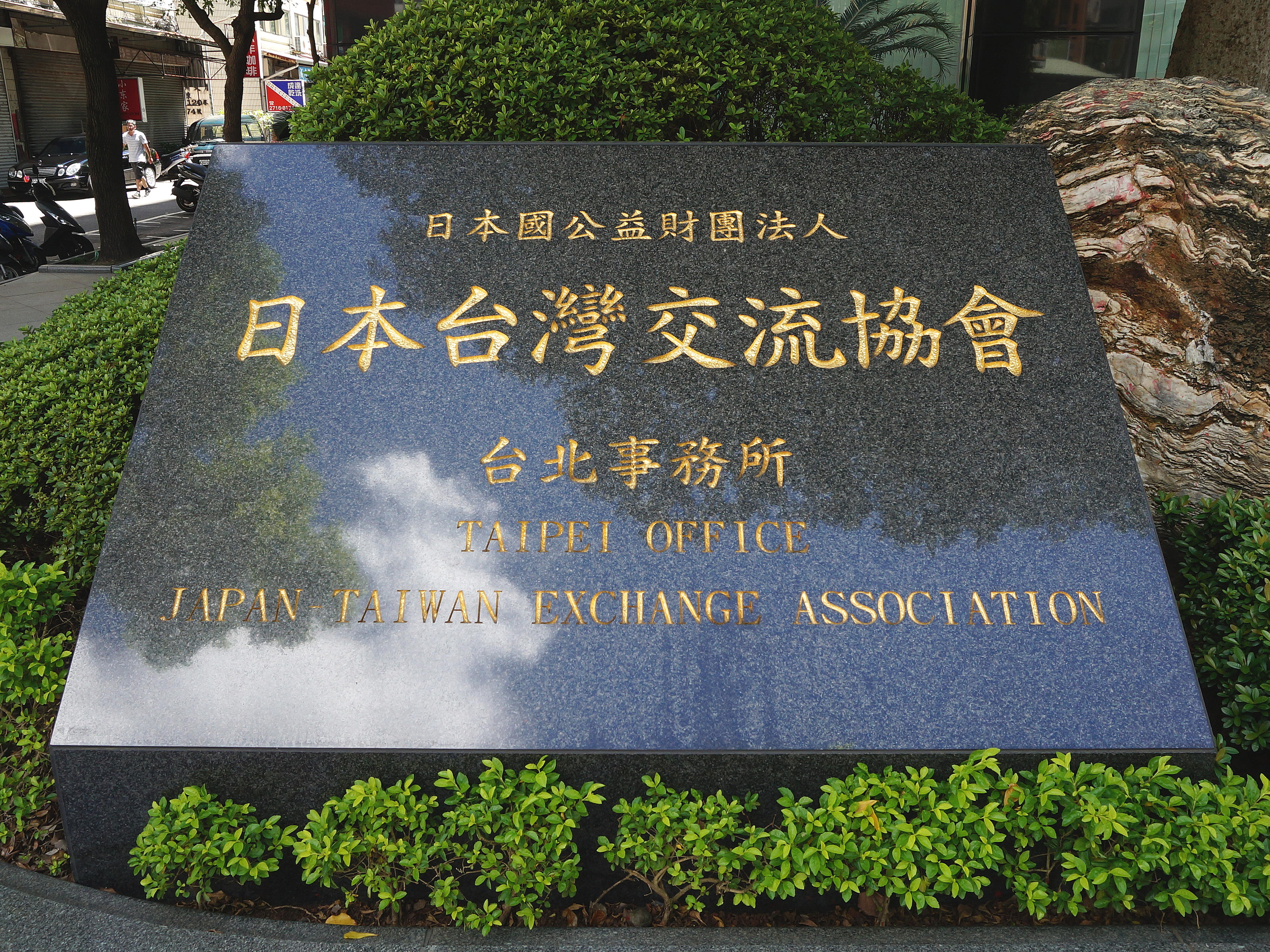
Japan–Taiwan Exchange Association in Taipei.

These were later renamed the "British Trade and Cultural Office" and "French Institute" respectively, and, were headed by career diplomats on secondment, rather than being operated by chambers of commerce or trade departments.

France now maintains a "French Office in Taipei", with cultural, consular and economic sections, while the "British Office" and German Institute Taipei perform similar functions on behalf of the United Kingdom and Germany.

Other countries which have broken off diplomatic relations with Taiwan also established de facto missions. In 1972, Japan established the "Interchange Association, Japan" (renamed the "Japan-Taiwan Exchange Association" in 2017), headed by personnel "on leave" from the Ministry of Foreign Affairs. This became known as the "Japanese formula", and would be adopted by other countries like the Philippines in 1975, which established the "Asian Exchange Center", replacing its former embassy. This was renamed the "Manila Economic and Cultural Office" in 1989.

Australia ended formal diplomatic relations in 1972, but did not establish an "Australian Commerce and Industry Office" until 1981. This was under control of the Australian Chamber of Commerce. It was renamed the "Australian Office in Taipei" in 2012. By contrast, New Zealand, which also ended formal diplomatic relations in 1972, did not establish the "New Zealand Commerce and Industry Office in Taipei" until 1989.

South Korea, which broke off diplomatic relations with Taiwan in 1992, has been represented by the "Korean Mission in Taipei" since 1993. South Africa, which ended diplomatic ties in 1998, is represented by the "Liaison Office of the Republic of South Africa".

India, which has always had diplomatic relations with the People's Republic of China, established an "India Taipei Association" in 1995, which is also authorised to provide consular and passport services.

Singapore, despite close ties with Taiwan, did not establish formal diplomatic relations, although it was the last ASEAN country to establish diplomatic relations with the People's Republic of China, in 1990. Consequently, it only established a "Trade Representative Office" in Taipei in 1979, renamed the "Singapore Trade Office in Taipei" in 1990.

=== Taiwan missions in other countries ===
Similarly, Taiwan maintains "representative offices" in other countries, which handle visa applications as well as relations with local authorities. These establishments use the term "Taipei" instead of "Taiwan" or "Republic of China" since the term "Taipei" avoids implying that Taiwan is a separate country from China or that there are "Two Chinas", both of which would cause difficulties for their host countries.

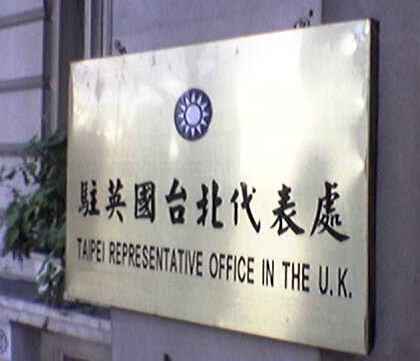
Taipei Representative Office in London, United Kingdom, displaying the national emblem of the Republic of China

In 2007, for example, the Irish Minister for Foreign Affairs, Dermot Ahern, confirmed that Ireland recognised the Government of the People's Republic of China as the sole legitimate government of "China", and that while the Taipei Representative Office in Dublin had a representative function in relation to economic and cultural promotion, it had no diplomatic or political status.

Before the 1990s, the names of these offices would vary considerably from country to country. For example, in the United States, Taipei's mission was known as the "Coordination Council for North American Affairs" (CCNAA), in Japan as the "Association of East Asian Relations" (AEAR), in the Philippines as the "Pacific Economic and Cultural Center" and in the United Kingdom as the "Free Chinese Centre".

However, in May 1992, the AEAR offices in Japan became Taipei Economic and Cultural Representative Office, as did the "Free Chinese Centre" in London. In September 1994, the Clinton Administration announced that the CCNAA office in Washington could similarly be called the Taipei Economic and Cultural Representative Office.

Earlier in 1989, the "Pacific Economic and Cultural Center" in Manila became the "Taipei Economic and Cultural Office in the Philippines". In 1991, the "Taiwan Marketing Service" office in Canberra, Australia, established in 1988, also became a "Taipei Economic and Cultural Office", along with the "Far East Trading Company" offices in Sydney and Melbourne.

Other names are still used elsewhere; for example, Taiwan's mission in Moscow is formally known as the "Representative Office in Moscow for the Taipei–Moscow Economic and Cultural Coordination Commission", the mission in New Delhi is known as the "Taipei Economic and Cultural Center", while the mission in Pretoria is known as the "Taipei Liaison Office".

In Papua New Guinea and Fiji, the Taiwanese missions are known as the "Trade Mission of the Republic of China (Taiwan) in Papua New Guinea" and "Trade Mission of the Republic of China (Taiwan) to the Republic of Fiji" respectively, despite both countries having diplomatic relations with the People's Republic of China. The Taipei Representative Office in Singapore was similarly known as the "Trade Mission of the Republic of China" until 1990.

In addition, Taiwan maintains "Taipei Economic and Cultural Offices" in Hong Kong and Macau, both Special Administrative Regions of the People's Republic of China. Previously, Taiwan was represented in Hong Kong by the "Chung Hwa Travel Service", established in 1966. In Macau, it was represented by the "Taipei Trade and Tourism Office", established in 1989 and renamed the "Taipei Trade and Cultural Office" in 1999. In May 2011, the "Chung Hwa Travel Service" was renamed the Taipei Economic and Cultural Office in Hong Kong, and in May 2012, the "Taipei Trade and Cultural Office" became the Taipei Economic and Cultural Office in Macau.

Relations between Taiwan and China are conducted through two quasi-official organisations, the Straits Exchange Foundation (SEF) in Taipei, and the Association for Relations Across the Taiwan Straits (ARATS) in Beijing. In 2012, the two organisations' chairmen, Lin Join-sane and Chen Yunlin announced talks on opening reciprocal representative offices, but did not commit to a timetable or reach an agreement. In 2013, President Ma Ying-jeou outlined plans to establish three SEF representative offices in China, with the ARATS establishing representative offices in Taiwan. The opposition Democratic Progressive Party expressed fears that China could use the offices as a channel for intelligence gathering in Taiwan, while China expressed concerns that they could be used as possible gathering areas for student demonstrators.

== Special administrative regions of the People's Republic of China ==
=== Hong Kong ===
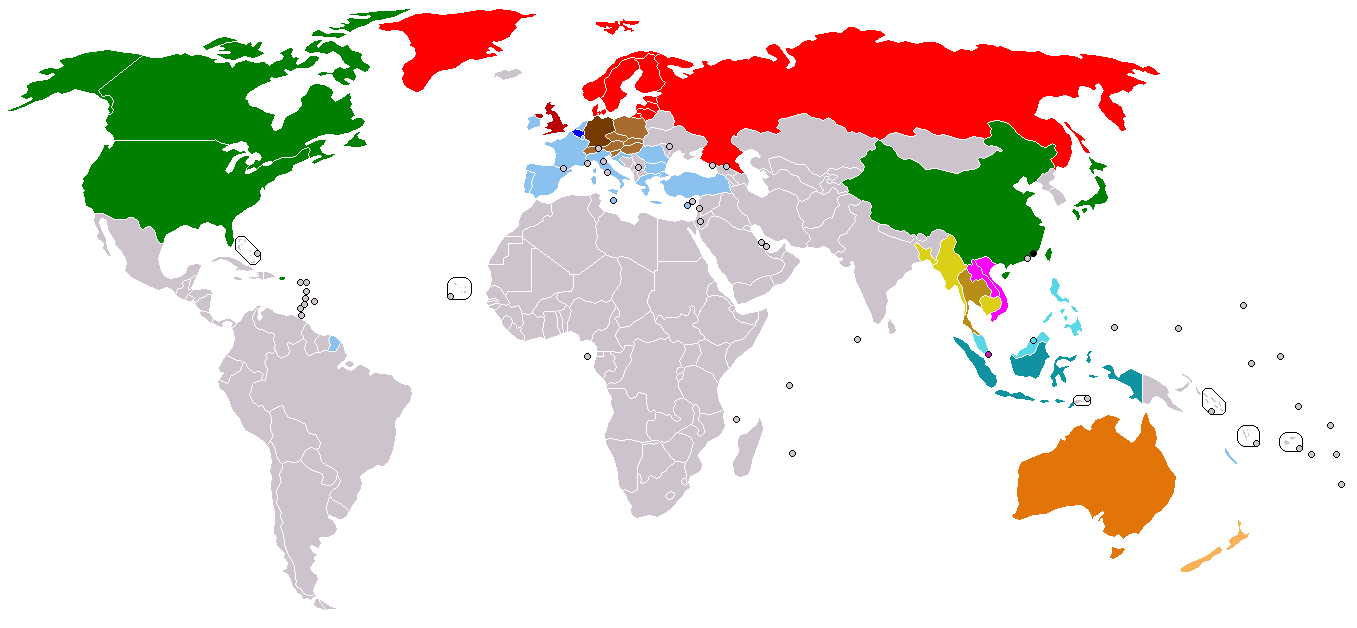
Hong Kong Economic and Trade Offices certified by the local government Countries hosting one or more offices ██ Bangkok office and covered countries ██ Berlin office and covered countries ██ Brussels office and covered countries ██ Jakarta office and covered countries ██ London office and covered countries ██ Singapore office and covered countries ██ Sydney office and covered countries

Due to Hong Kong's status as a Special Administrative Region, Hong Kong Economic and Trade Offices enjoy some privileges and immunities equivalent to those of a diplomatic mission under legislation passed by host countries such as the United Kingdom, Canada and Australia. Under British administration, they were known as Hong Kong Government Offices, and were headed by a Commissioner.

Similarly, foreign diplomatic missions there function independently of their embassies in Beijing, reporting directly to their foreign ministries. For example, the United States Consulate General reports to the Department of State with the Consul General as the "Chief of Mission".

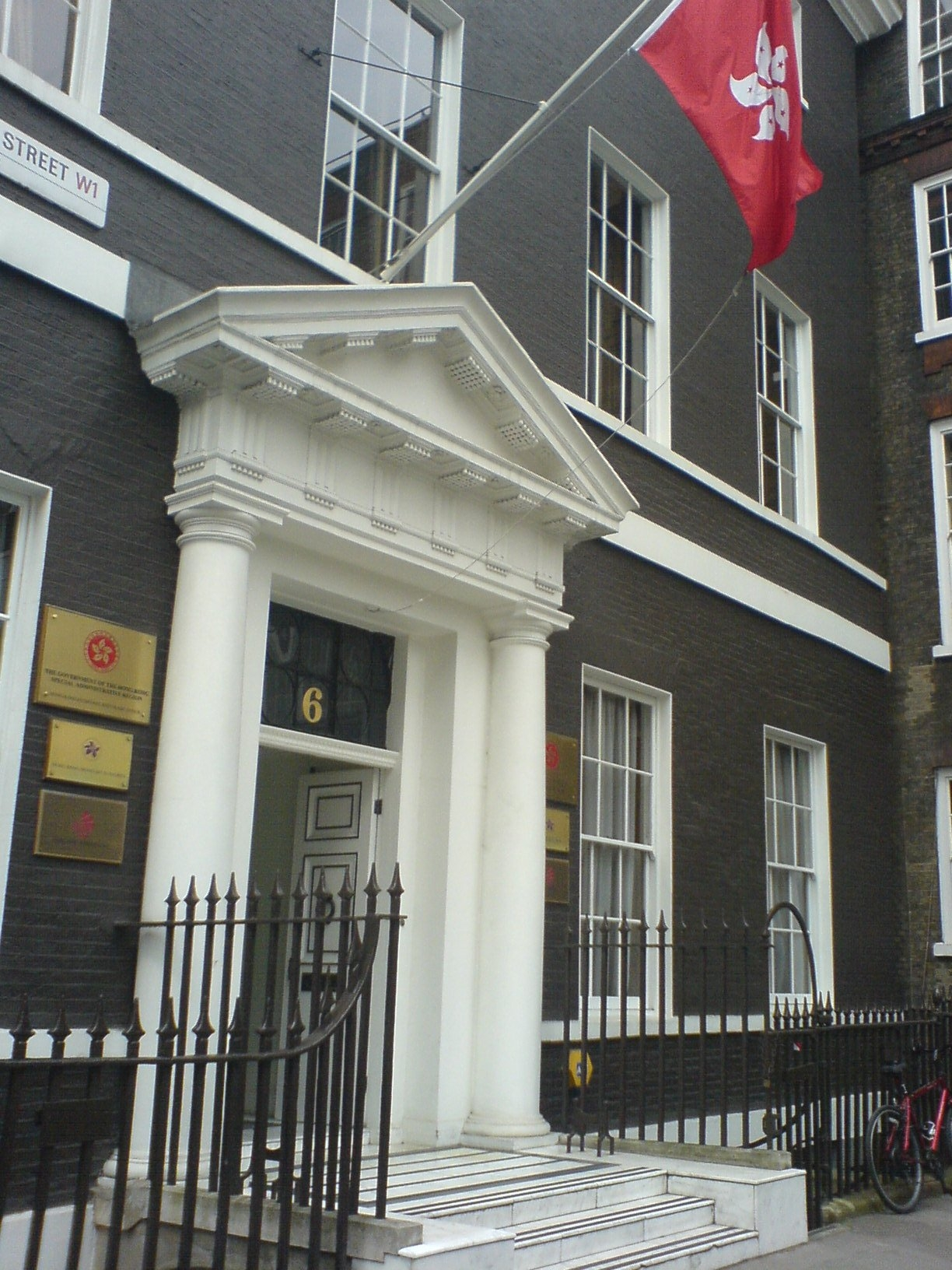
Hong Kong Economic and Trade Office in London

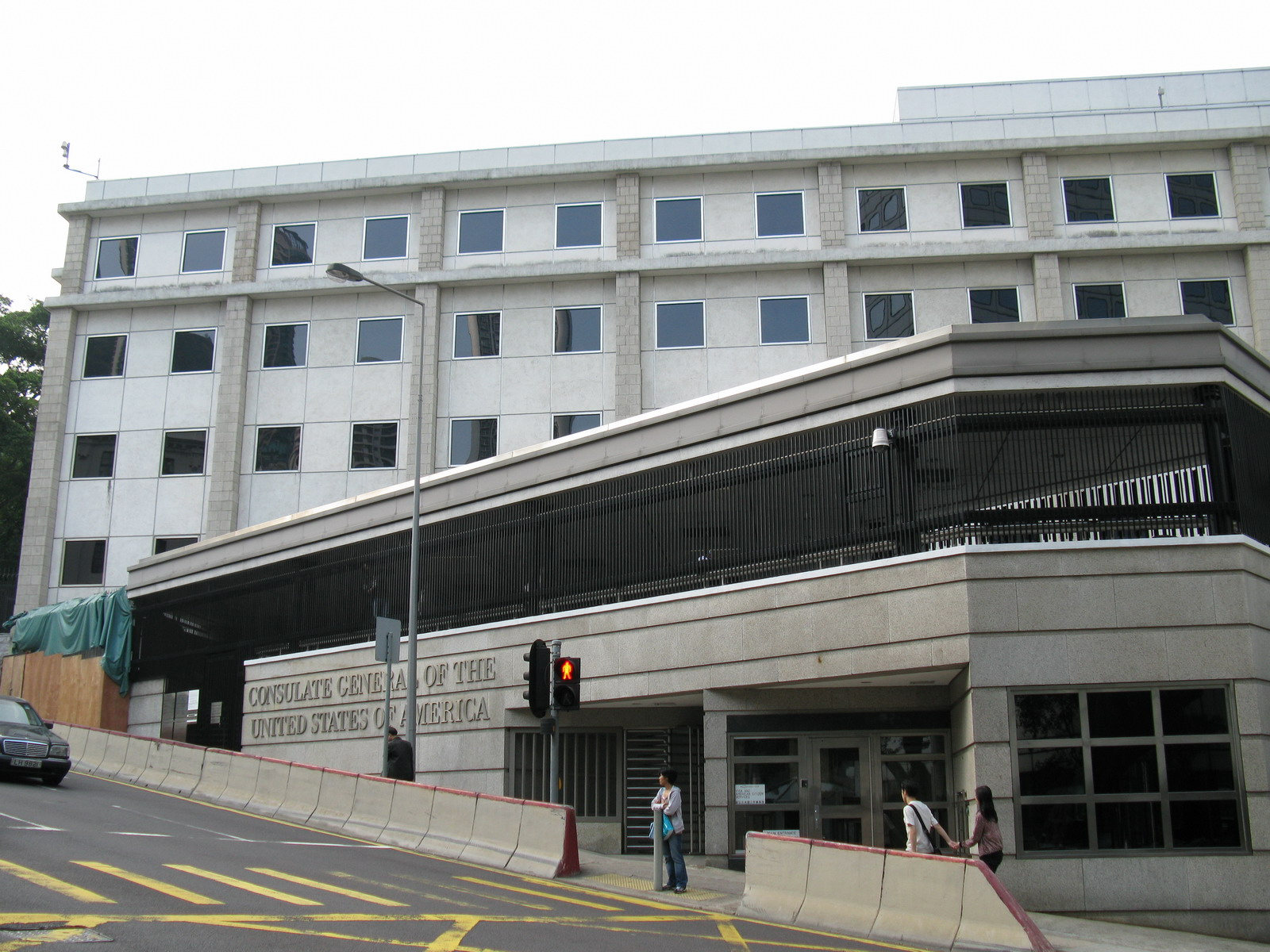
Consulate-General of the United States in Hong Kong

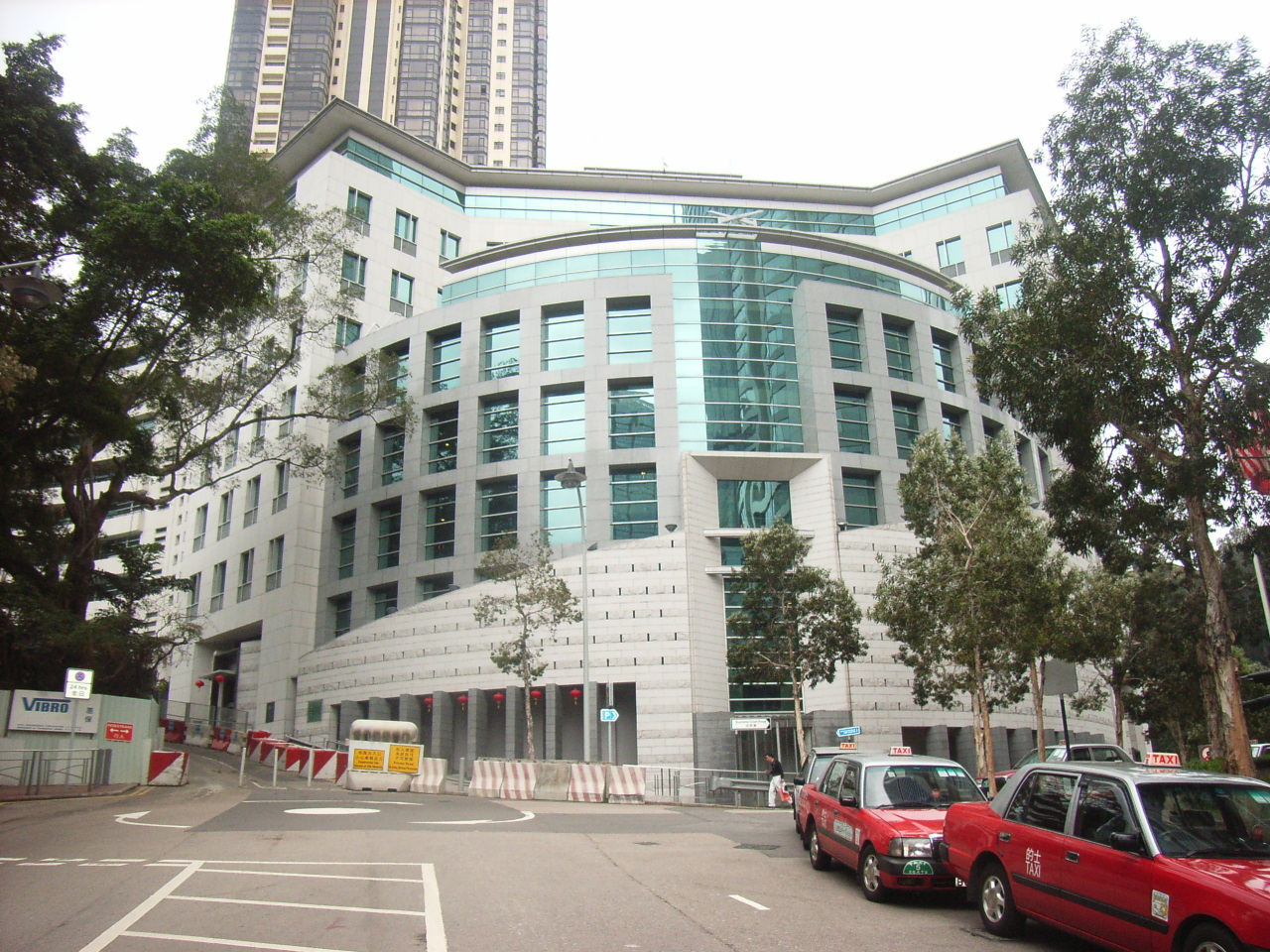
British Consulate General in Hong Kong

When Hong Kong was under British administration, diplomatic missions of Commonwealth countries, such as Australia, Bangladesh Canada, India, Malaysia, New Zealand Nigeria and Singapore maintained Commissions. However, the Australian Commission was renamed the consulate-general in 1986. Following the transfer of sovereignty to China in 1997, the remaining Commissions were renamed Consulates-General. with the last commissioner becoming consul-general.

=== Macau ===
Macau, also a Special Administrative Region, similarly has the right to set up Macao Economic and Trade Offices around the world, which enjoy some privileges and immunities equivalent to those of a diplomatic mission under legislation passed by host countries such as Portugal, Belgium and others.

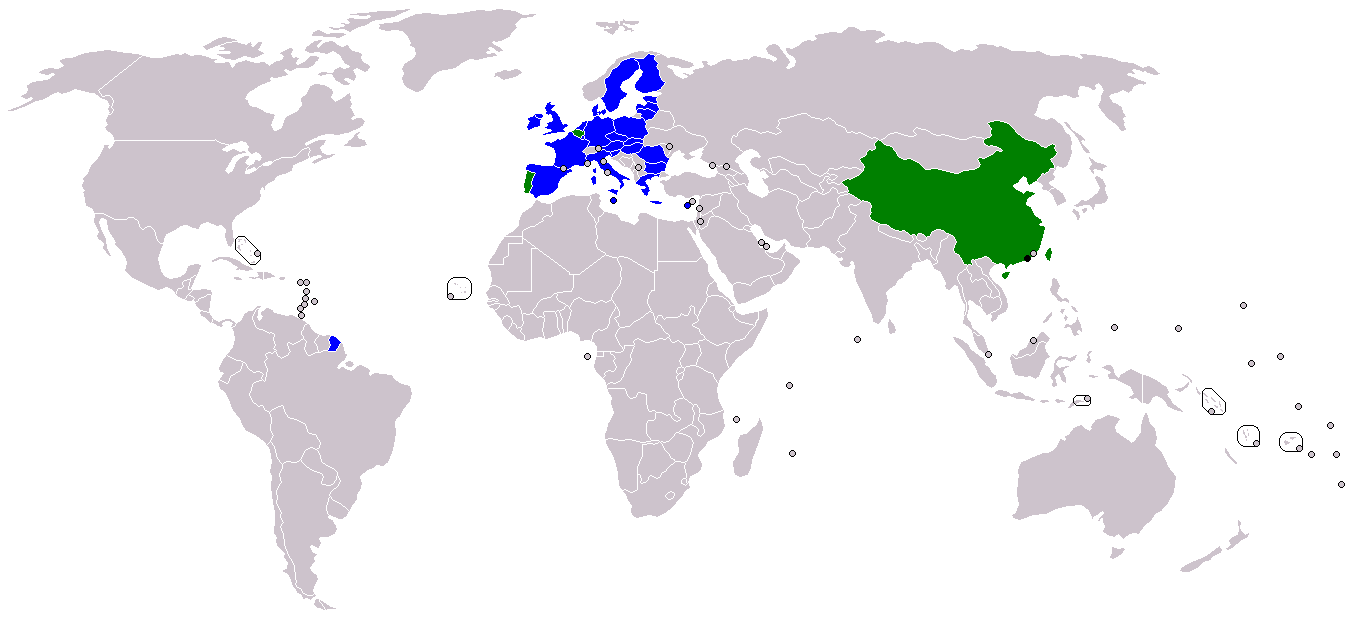
Office certified by the local government Countries hosting an office European Union, members not hosting an individual office

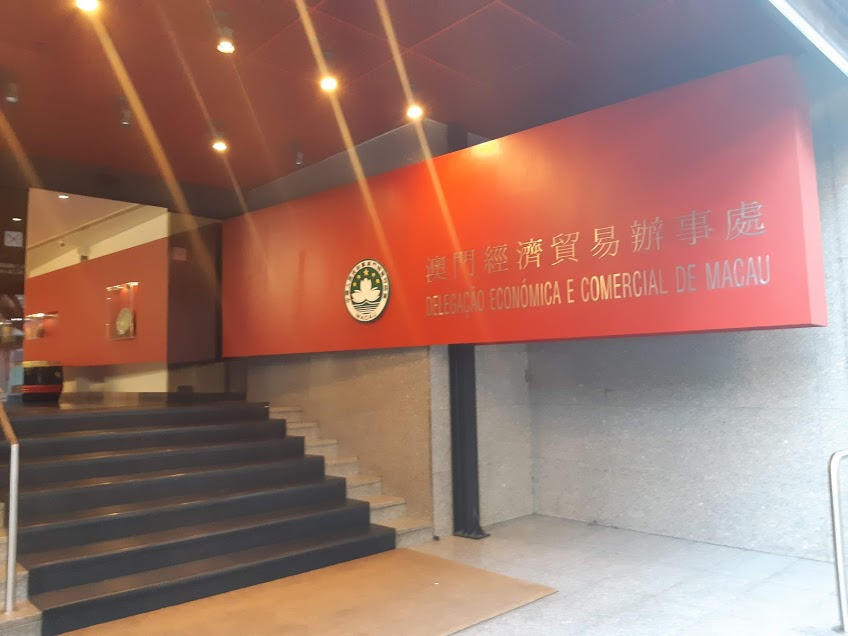
Macao Economic and Trade Office in Lisbon

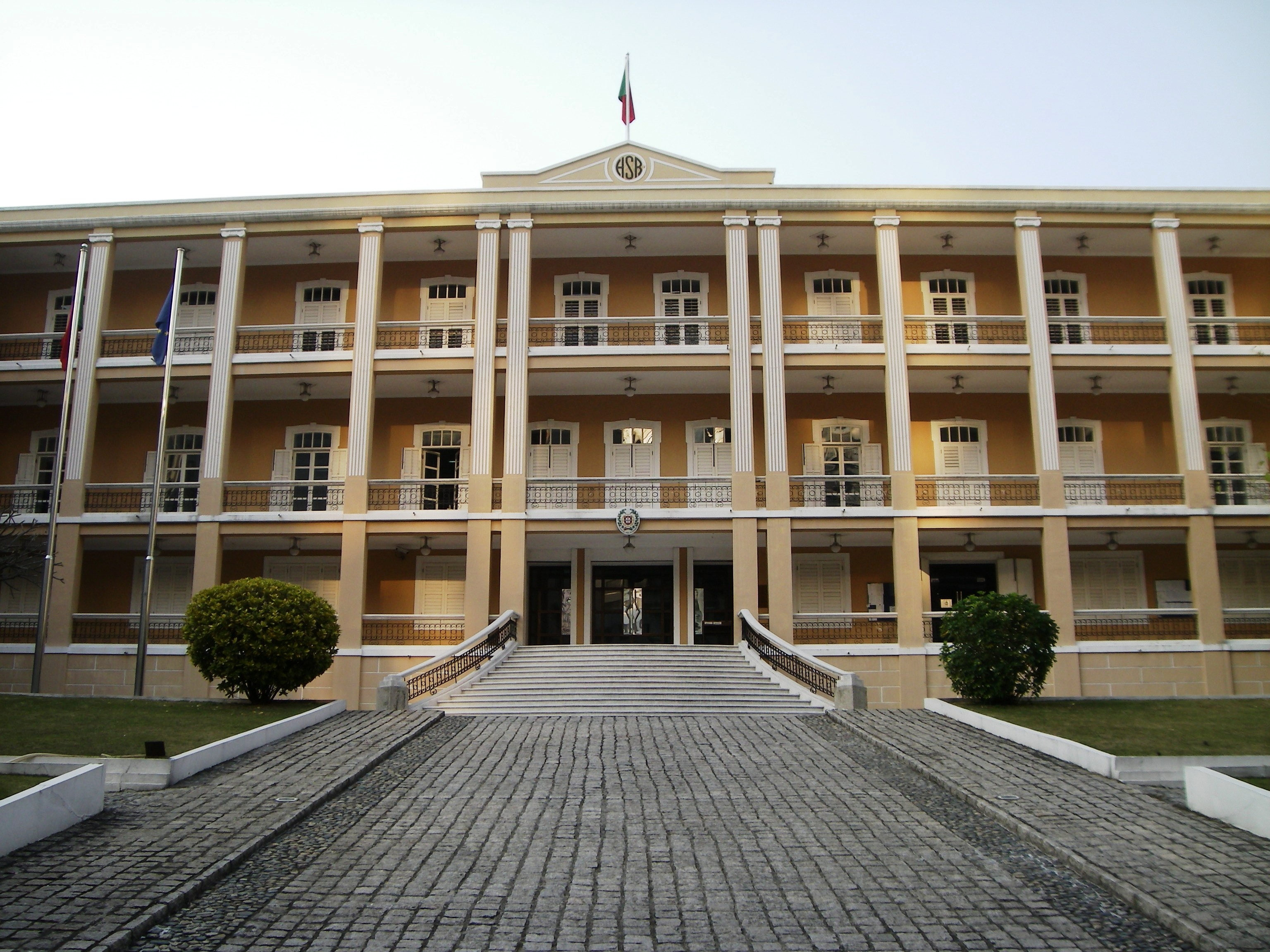
Consulate General of Portugal in Macau

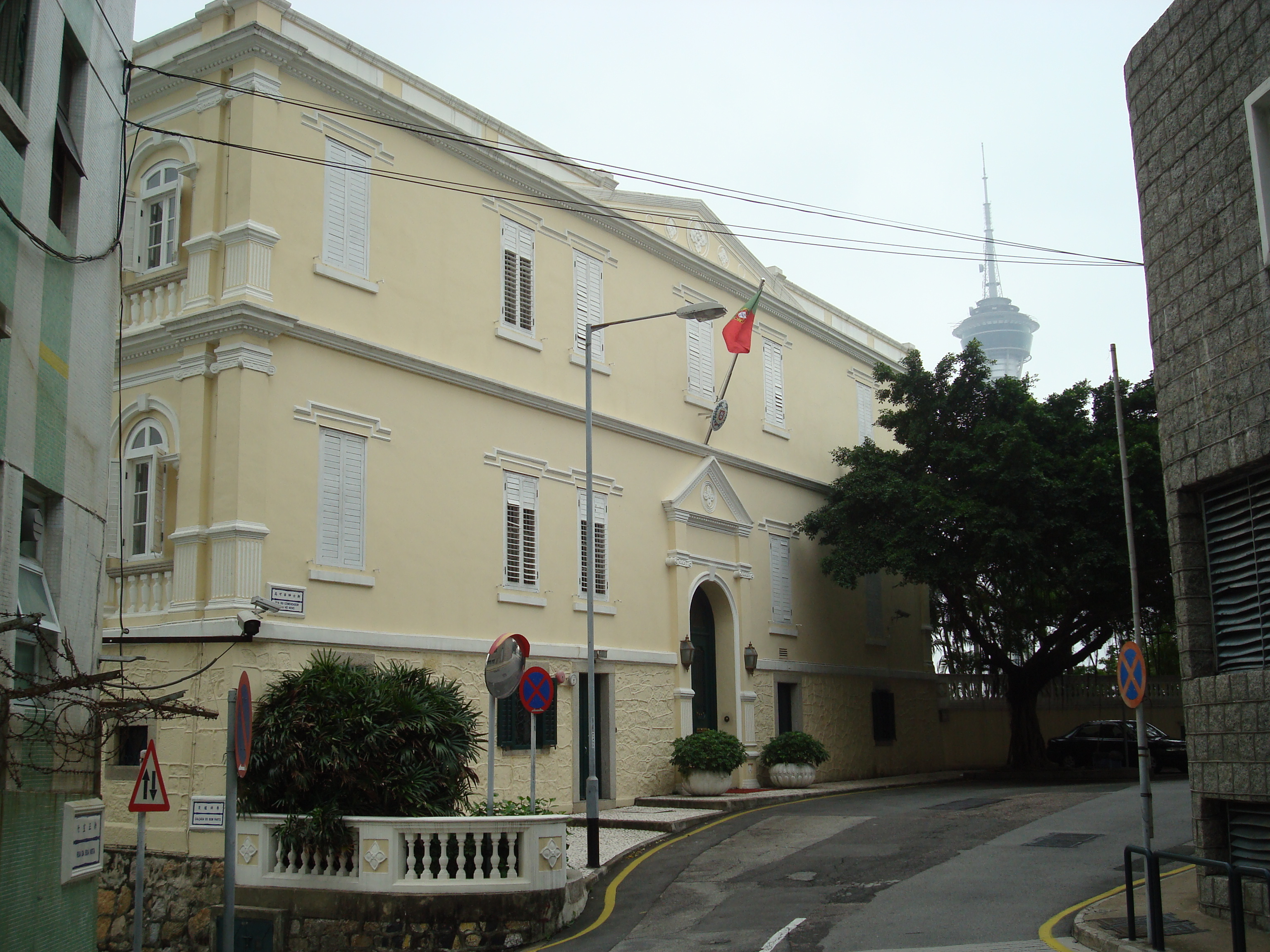
Portuguese Consul General residence

== Disputed territories ==
=== West Germany and East Germany ===
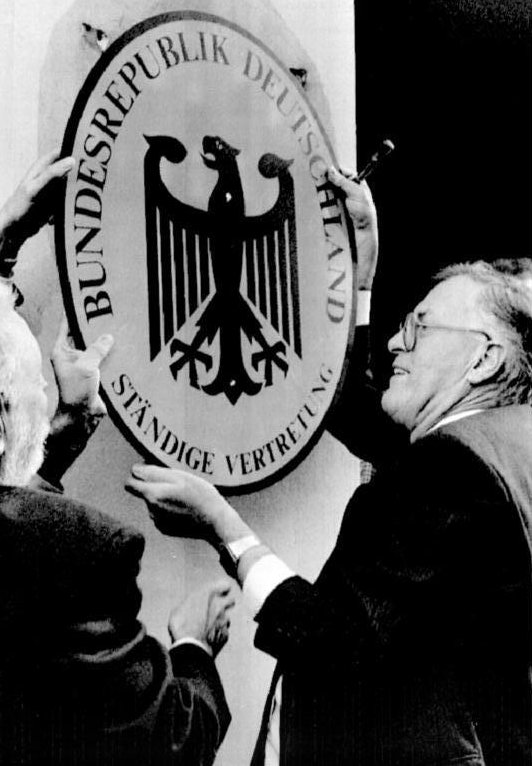
On 2 October 1990, the last head of the West German Permanent Mission in East Germany, Franz Bertele, removes the shield from the office building following German reunification.

Prior to the reunification of Germany, West and East Germany were each represented by a "permanent mission" (Ständige Vertretung), in East Berlin and Bonn respectively. These were headed by a "permanent representative", who served as a de facto ambassador. The permanent missions were established under Article 8 of the Basic Treaty in 1972. Previously, West Germany had always claimed to represent the whole of Germany, reflected in the Hallstein Doctrine, which prescribed that the Federal Republic would not establish or maintain diplomatic relations with any state that recognised the GDR. Its opposition even extended to any country (such as India) allowing East Germany to open trade missions on their territory, which Bonn viewed as de facto recognition of the government in East Berlin.

However, the GDR operated unofficial missions in Western countries, such as Britain, where "KfA Ltd", an agency of the Kammer für Außenhandel, or Department of Foreign Trade of the Ministry of Foreign Affairs, was established in 1959. By the early 1970s, this had begun to function as a de facto East German embassy in London, including diplomats on its staff.

After 1973, West Germany no longer asserted an exclusive mandate over the whole of Germany, but still did not consider East Germany to be a "foreign" country. Instead of being conducted through the Foreign Office, relations were conducted through a separate Federal Ministry for Intra-German Relations, known until 1969 as the Federal Ministry of All-German Affairs.

In contrast, East Germany did consider West Germany a completely separate country, meaning that while the East German mission in Bonn was accredited to the West German Chancellery, its West German counterpart in East Berlin was accredited to East Germany's Ministry of Foreign Affairs.

=== Rhodesia after UDI ===
Following its Unilateral Declaration of Independence (UDI) in 1965, Rhodesia maintained overseas missions in Lisbon and Lourenço Marques (now Maputo) until 1975 and an "Accredited Diplomatic Representative" in Pretoria. The Rhodesian Information Office in Washington remained open, but its director, Ken Towsey, and his staff were deprived of their diplomatic status. (Following the country's independence as Zimbabwe, Towsey became chargé d'affaires at the new embassy.)

The flag of Rhodesia, adopted in 1968, was denounced as an illegal symbol when raised over Rhodesia House in London in 1969.

The High Commission in London, known as Rhodesia House, continued to function until it was closed in 1969, following the decision by white Rhodesians in a referendum to make the country a republic. The British Residual Mission in Salisbury was closed at the same time. Prior to its closure, the mission flew the newly adopted Flag of Rhodesia in a provocative gesture, as the Commonwealth Prime Ministers arrived in London for their Conference. This was considered illegal by the Foreign Office, and prompted calls by Labour MP Willie Hamilton, who condemned it as "the flag of an illegal Government in rebellion against the Crown", for its removal.

In Australia, the federal government sought to close the Rhodesia Information Centre in Sydney. In 1973, the Labor government of Gough Whitlam cut post and telephone links to the centre, but this was ruled illegal by the High Court. An office was also established in Paris, but was closed down by the French government in 1977.

Similarly, the United States recalled its consul-general from Salisbury, and reduced consular staff, but did not move to close its consulate until the declaration of a republic in 1970. South Africa, however, retained its "Accredited Diplomatic Representative" after the UDI, which allowed it to continue to recognise British sovereignty as well as to deal with the de facto authority of the government of Ian Smith.

The self-styled "South African Diplomatic Mission" in Salisbury became the only such mission remaining in the country after 1975, when Portugal downgraded its mission to consul level, having recalled its consul-general from Salisbury in May 1970.

=== Bophuthatswana ===
Bophuthatswana, one of four nominally independent "homelands" created by South Africa under apartheid, was not recognised as an independent state by any other country. Consequently, it only had diplomatic relations with Pretoria, which maintained an embassy in Mmabatho, its capital. However, it established representative offices internationally, including in London and Tel Aviv.

"Bophuthatswana House" in Tel Aviv was the only place outside South Africa to fly the homeland's flag.

The opening of "Bophuthatswana House" in Holland Park in London in 1982, attended by the homeland's president, Lucas Mangope, prompted demonstrations by the Anti-Apartheid Movement, and while the British government gave Mangope a special travel document to enter the United Kingdom, it refused to accord the mission diplomatic status.

In 1985, a "Bophuthatswana House" was opened in Tel Aviv, in a building on HaYarkon Street next to the British Embassy. Despite the objections of the Israeli Ministry of Foreign Affairs, the homeland's flag was flown from the building.

Following the end of apartheid and the reincorporation of the homeland into South Africa, the Bophuthatswana government properties were acquired by the new South African government and sold.

=== China in Hong Kong and Macau ===
When Hong Kong was under British administration, China did not establish a consulate in what it considered to be part of its national territory. However, the Communist government of the People's Republic of China in Beijing, and its predecessor, the Kuomintang government of the Republic of China in Nanking established de facto representation in the colony.

While the Nationalist government had negotiated with the British regarding the appointment of a Consul-General in Hong Kong in 1945, it decided against such an appointment, with its representative in the colony, T W Kwok (Kuo Teh-hua) instead being styled "Special Commissioner for Hong Kong". This was in addition to his role as Nanking's Special Commissioner for Kwangtung and Kwangsi. Disagreements also arose with the British authorities, with the Governor, Alexander Grantham, opposing an office building for the "Commissioner for Foreign Affairs of the Provinces of Kwangtung and Kuangsi" being erected on the site of the Walled City in Kowloon. In 1950, following British recognition of the People's Republic of China, the office of the Special Commissioner was closed and Kwok withdrawn.

In 1956, the Chinese Premier Zhou Enlai requested the opening of a representative office in Hong Kong, but this also was opposed by Grantham, who advised the Secretary of State for the Colonies, Alan Lennox-Boyd in 1957 that it would a) give "an aura of respectability" to pro-Communist elements, b) have "a deplorable effect" on the morale of Chinese in Hong Kong, c) give the impression to friendly countries that Britain was retreating from the colony, d) that there would be no end to the claims of the Chinese representative as to what constituted his functions, and e) become a target for Kuomintang and other anti-communist activities.

Consequently, the People's Republic of China was only represented unofficially in Hong Kong by the Xinhua News Agency Hong Kong Branch, which had been operating in the colony since 1945. In addition to being a bona fide news agency, Xinhua also served as cover for the "underground" local branch of the Chinese Communist Party known as the Hong Kong and Macau Work Committee (HKMWC). It also opened additional district branches on Hong Kong Island, Kowloon and the New Territories in 1985 to expand its influence.

Despite its unofficial status, the directors of the Xinhua Hong Kong Branch included high-ranking former diplomats such as Zhou Nan, former Ambassador to the United Nations and Vice-Minister of Foreign Affairs, who later negotiated the Sino-British Joint Declaration on the future of Hong Kong. His predecessor, Xu Jiatun, was also vice-chairman of the Hong Kong Basic Law Drafting Committee, before fleeing to the United States in response to the military crackdown on the Tiananmen Square protests, where he went into exile.

On 18 January 2000, after the transfer of sovereignty over Hong Kong, the branch office of Xinhua became the Liaison Office of the Central People's Government in the Hong Kong Special Administrative Region.

When Macau was under Portuguese administration, the People's Republic of China was unofficially represented by the Nanguang trading company. This later became known as China Central Enterprise Nam Kwong (Group). Established in 1949, officially to promote trade ties between Macau and mainland China, it operated as the unofficial representative and "shadow government" of the People's Republic in relation to the Portuguese administration.

It also served to challenge the rival "Special Commissariat of the Ministry of Foreign Affairs of the Republic of China" in the territory, which represented the Kuomintang government on Taiwan. This was closed after the pro-Communist 12-3 incident in 1966, after which the Portuguese authorities agreed to ban all Kuomintang activities in Macau. Following the Carnation Revolution, Portugal redefined Macau as a "Chinese territory under Portuguese administration" in 1976. However, Lisbon did not establish diplomatic relations with Beijing until 1979.

In 1984, Nam Kwong was split into political and trading arms. On 21 September 1987, a Macau branch of Xinhua News Agency was established which, as in Hong Kong, became Beijing's unofficial representative, replacing Nam Kwong. On 18 January 2000, a month after the transfer of sovereignty over Macau, the Macau branch became the Liaison Office of the Central People's Government in the Macau Special Administrative Region.

=== Northern Cyprus ===
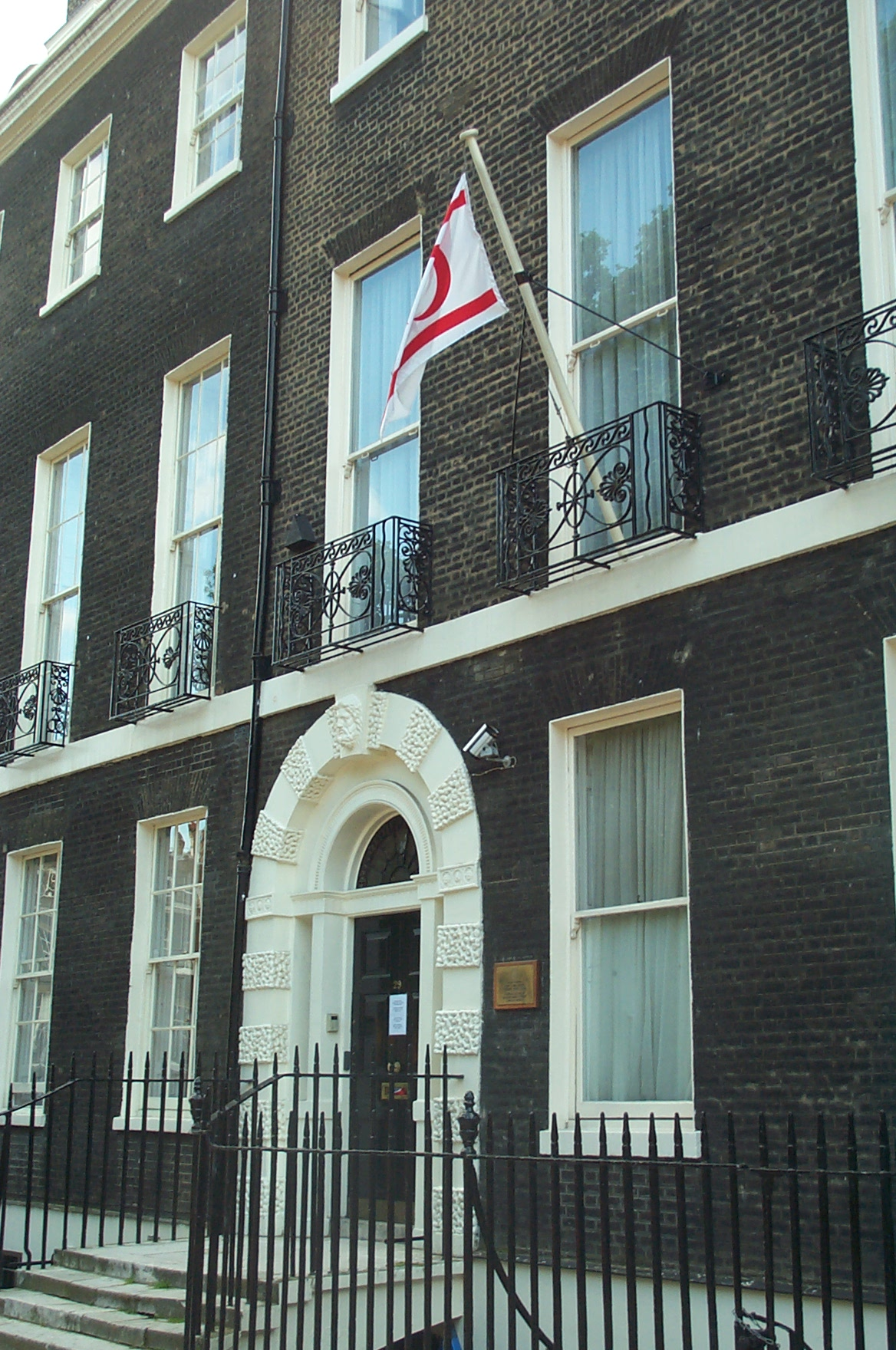
Representative Office of the Turkish Republic of Northern Cyprus in London, United Kingdom

As the Turkish Republic of Northern Cyprus, declared in 1983, is only recognised as an independent state by Turkey, it is represented in other countries by "Representative Offices", most notably in London, Washington, New York, Brussels, Islamabad, Abu Dhabi and Baku.

== Scotland, Wales and Northern Ireland ==
Scotland, Northern Ireland and Wales each maintain their own network of representative offices for trade and cultural purposes within their status as countries of the United Kingdom. The Scottish Government maintains 36 representative offices around the world, managed by the External Affairs Directorate. The Welsh Government maintains 21 representative offices in twelve countries. The Northern Ireland Executive maintains representative offices in Brussels, Beijing and Washington, D.C.

== Regions ==
=== Quebec ===
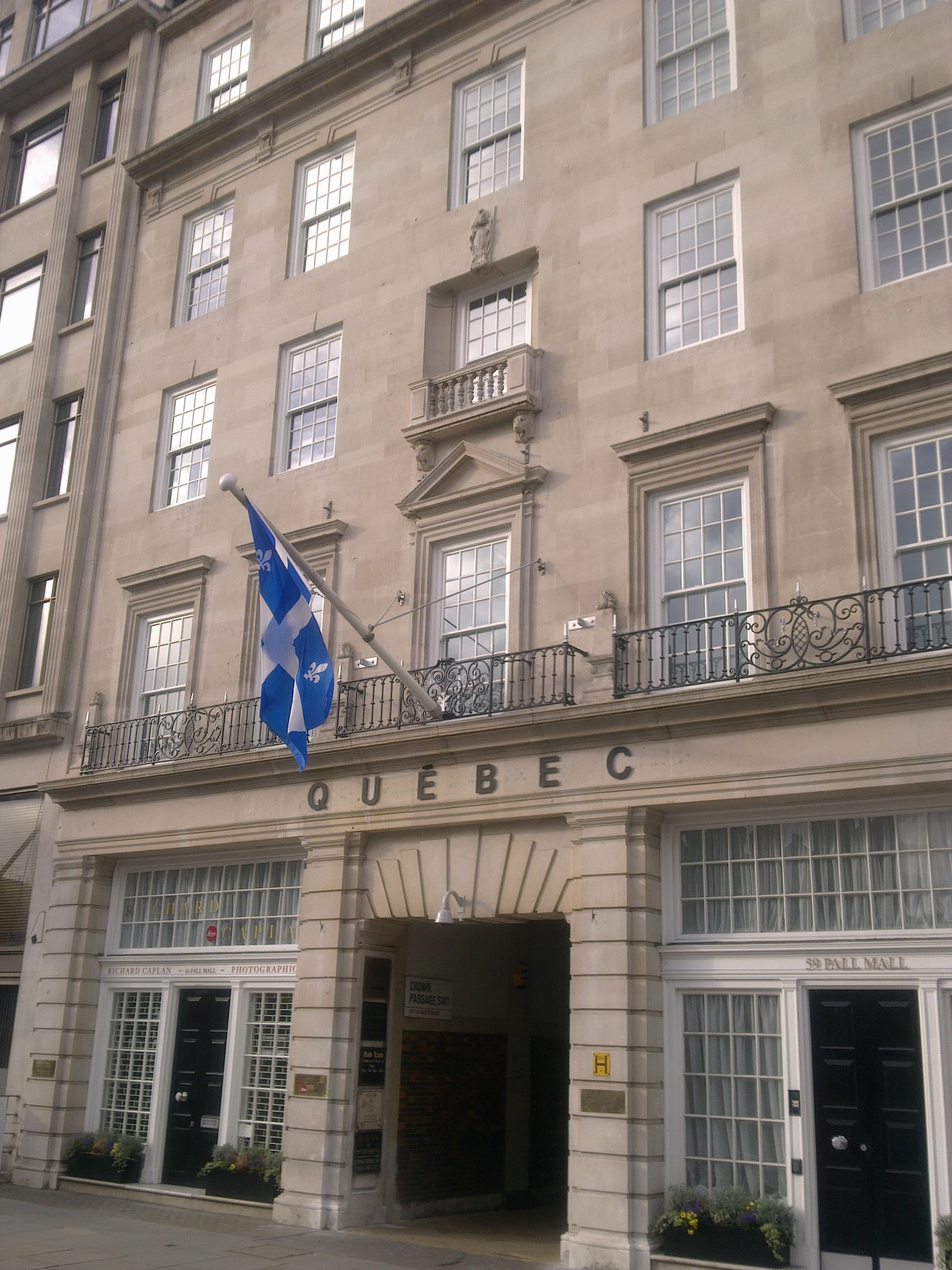
The Quebec Government Office at 59 Pall Mall in London, England

The Quebec Government Offices (French: Délégations générales du Québec) are the Government of Quebec's official representations around the world. They are overseen by Quebec's Ministry of International Relations.

The network of 33 offices in 18 countries consists of eight general delegations, five delegations, thirteen government bureaux, five trade branches, and two areas of representation in multilateral affairs.

=== Kurdistan Region ===
The Kurdistan regional Government in Iraq maintains representative offices in 13 countries and to the European Union.

=== Catalonia ===
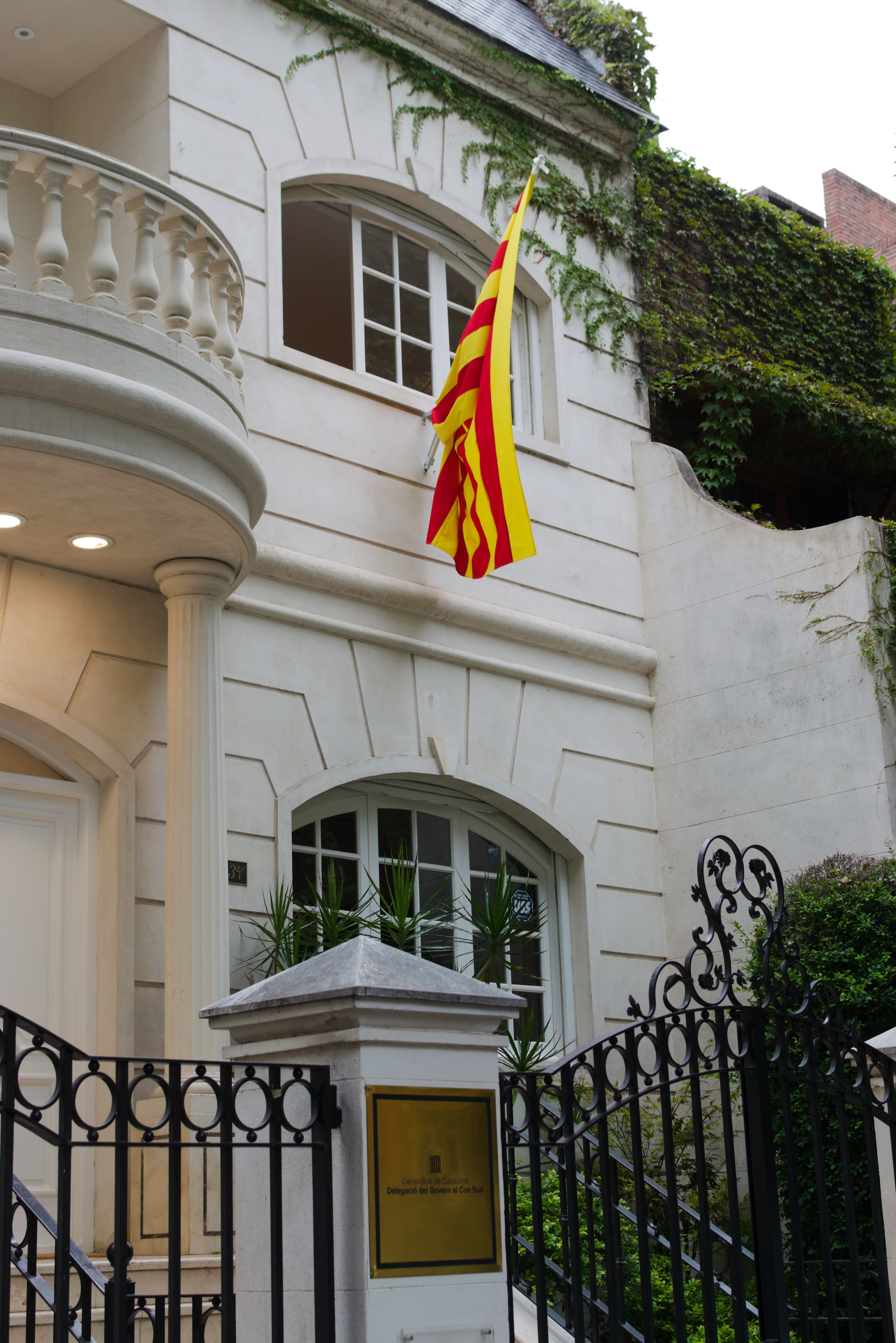
The Delegation of the Government of Catalonia in Buenos Aires, Argentina

Due to the further devolution of powers to the autonomous community of Catalonia in 2006, the right of the Government of Catalonia to establish delegations abroad in order to carry out its own non-diplomatic "foreign action" was recognized, while foreign affairs remained an exclusive matter of the Spanish Government. Currently, Catalonia's Ministry for Foreign Action and Europe maintains 17 delegations of the Government of Catalonia abroad, including one before the European Union.

=== Montenegro (before 2006) ===
Prior to achieving full independence in 2006, Montenegro effectively ran its own foreign policy independently of the Federal Republic of Yugoslavia and the Union of Serbia and Montenegro, with a Ministry of Foreign Affairs in Podgorica and trade missions abroad operating as de facto embassies.

=== Tatarstan ===
Russia's federal subject Republic of Tatarstan has acting Plenipotantiary Representations in Azerbaijan, Turkey and Kazakhstan.

== Dependent territories ==
=== Commonwealth of Nations ===
Historically, in British colonies, independent Commonwealth countries were represented by Commissions, which functioned independently of their High Commissions in London. For example, Canada, Australia and New Zealand maintained Commissions in Singapore, while following its independence in 1947, India established Commissions in Kenya, Trinidad and Tobago, and Mauritius which became High Commissions on independence. Canada formerly had a Commissioner to Bermuda, although this post was held by the Consul-General to New York City, but there is now an Honorary Canadian Consulate on the island. Commissions of Commonwealth countries in the dependent territory of Hong Kong, such as those of Australia, Canada and Singapore, became consulates-general in name in 1997 but continues to report directly to the respective foreign ministries. Tokelau, a dependent territory of New Zealand, maintains the Tokelau Apia Liaison Office in Samoa as its main physical connection with the outside world.

=== Southern Rhodesia ===
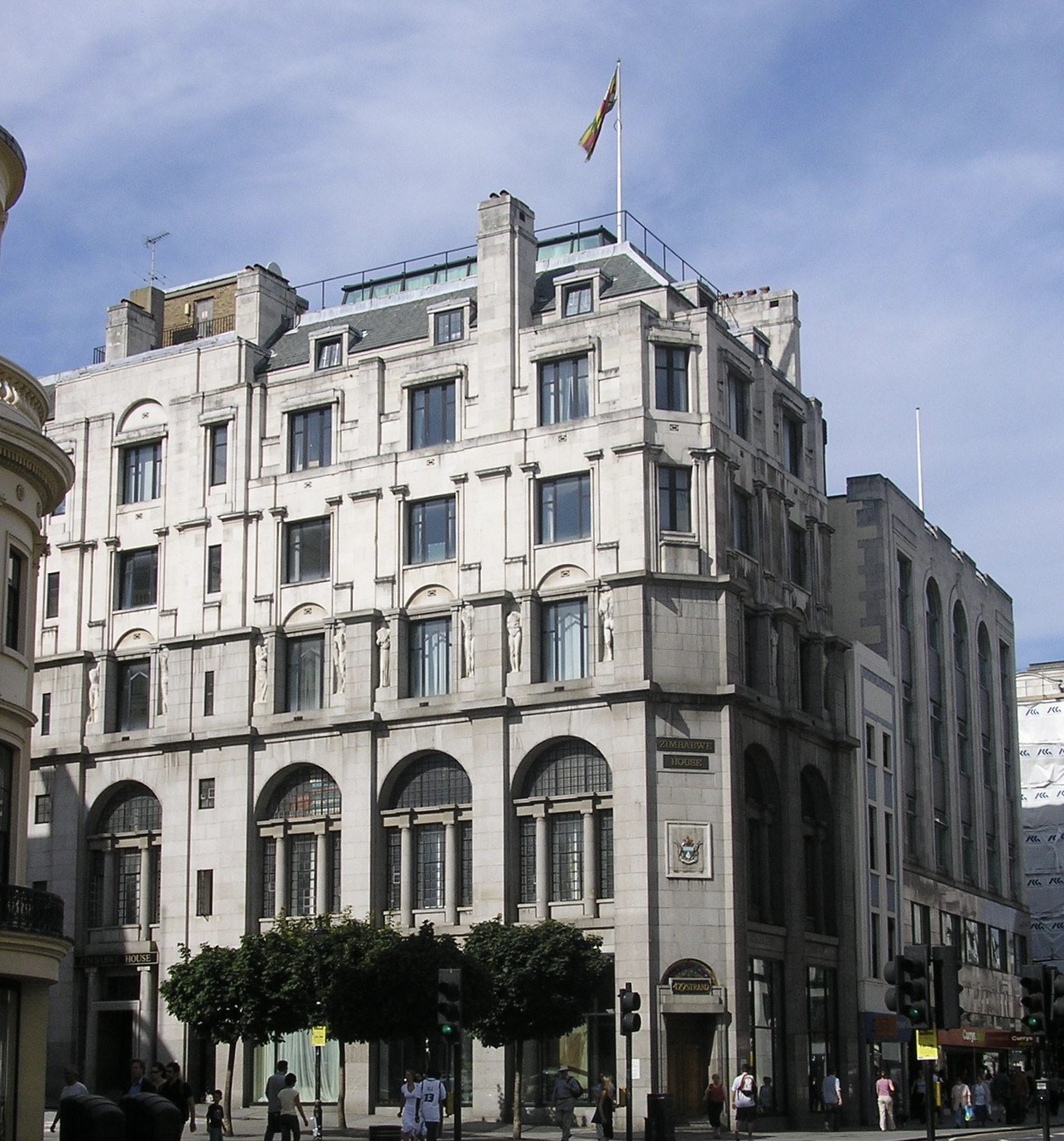
Rhodesia House was the office of the colony's High Commissioner in London. (2006 photograph)

Southern Rhodesia, uniquely among British colonies, was represented in London by a High Commission from 1923, while the British government was represented by a High Commission in Salisbury from 1951. Following the Unilateral Declaration of Independence in 1965, when the British High Commissioner was withdrawn and the Rhodesian High Commissioner requested to leave London, both High Commissions were downgraded to residual missions before being closed down in 1970.

The self-governing colony also established a High Commission in Pretoria, following the decision of the then Union of South Africa to establish one in Salisbury, which, after South Africa's withdrawal from the Commonwealth in 1961, was renamed the "South African Diplomatic Mission" with the High Commissioner becoming the "Accredited Diplomatic Representative". Southern Rhodesia, which briefly became part of the Federation of Rhodesia and Nyasaland, was also able to establish its own consulate in Lourenço Marques (now Maputo) in Mozambique. In addition, it also had a "Minister for Rhodesian Affairs" in Washington, DC operating under the aegis of the British Embassy, as well representatives in Tokyo and Bonn.

During 1965, the government of Rhodesia, as the colony now called itself, made moves to establish a mission in Lisbon separate from the British Embassy, with its own accredited representative, prompting protests from the British government, which insisted that the representative, Harry Reedman, should be a nominal member of the British Ambassador's staff. For their part, the Portuguese authorities sought a compromise whereby they would accept Reedman as an independent representative but deny him diplomatic status.

== Trade missions ==
=== South Africa and neighbouring countries ===
Under apartheid, South Africa maintained trade missions in neighbouring countries with which it did not have diplomatic relations, such as Rhodesia (now Zimbabwe), where, following the country's independence, the "South African Diplomatic Mission" in Salisbury (now Harare) was closed. A trade mission was also established in Maputo, Mozambique, in 1984, nine years after the South African consulate was closed following independence in 1975.

Similarly, Mauritius maintained a trade mission in Johannesburg, the country's commercial capital, as did Zimbabwe, after the closure of its missions in Pretoria and Cape Town.

Following majority rule in 1994, full diplomatic relations were established, and these became High Commissions, after South Africa rejoined the Commonwealth.

=== South Korea and China ===
Prior to the establishment of full diplomatic relations in 1992, South Korea and the People's Republic of China established trade offices in Beijing and Seoul, under the auspices of the China Council for the Promotion of International Trade, and KOTRA, the Korea Trade Promotion Corporation respectively. The South Korean office in Beijing was established in January 1991, while the Chinese office was established in April of that year.

== Other missions ==
=== Commonwealth of Nations ===
Commonwealth countries do not exchange "Ambassadors" with each other but "High Commissioners". This in no way implies a lack of recognition of sovereignty nor tense government to government relations. It is simply a vestige that the relations between the countries are not fully "foreign". Generally High Commissioners are appointed less formally by letters between Prime Ministers than formal letters of Accreditation to the head of state. There are in some cases minor enhancements in protocol where High Commissioners enjoy a "higher" precedence than Ambassadors.

In practical terms, High Commissions function exactly the same as embassies. Buildings have changed status to reflect the changing political and legal environment. Rhodesia House in London was the Southern Rhodesian High Commission, then the Rhodesian Residual Mission after UDI, then the Zimbabwean High Commission after legal independence, then the Zimbabwean Embassy after leaving the Commonwealth.

Embassies have become High Commissions as countries joined or rejoined the Commonwealth. (e.g. Fiji, The Gambia, Maldives, Pakistan and South Africa)

Ireland had High Commissioners in London and Ottawa until 18 April 1949, when the Republic of Ireland was declared. Similarly, Australia and Canada had High Commissioners in Dublin.

=== South Africa and China ===
Prior to the establishment of full diplomatic relations in 1998, South Africa and the People's Republic of China established "cultural centres" in Beijing and Pretoria, known as the South African Centre for Chinese Studies and the Chinese Centre for South African Studies respectively. Although the Centres, each headed by a Director, did not use diplomatic titles, national flags, or coats of arms, their staff used diplomatic passports and were issued with diplomatic identity documents, while their vehicles had diplomatic number plates. They also performed visa and consular services.

=== Israel and China ===
Prior to the establishment of full diplomatic relations in 1992, Israel and the People's Republic of China established representative offices in Beijing and Tel Aviv. The Israeli office was formally known as the Liaison Office of the Israel Academy of Sciences and Humanities. This was opened in June 1990. China was similarly represented by a branch of the China International Travel Service, which also opened in 1990.

=== United States ===
In the U.S., “diplomatic couriers” do “enjoy the privileges and immunities specified in the Vienna Convention,” as well as “their families,” and “the members of the mission,” even “the mission” itself; with respect to a nonparty to the Vienna Convention.

== Liaison offices ==
=== Greece and the Former Yugoslav Republic of Macedonia ===
Until 2019, Greece and the then Republic of Macedonia only maintained "Liaison Offices", with Greece being represented in Skopje by a mission known as the "Liaison Office of the Hellenic Republic", and Macedonia by the "Liaison Office of the Republic of Macedonia" in Athens. This was to the naming dispute between the two states, but following the Republic of Macedonia adoption of the name "North Macedonia" and the signing of an agreement with Greece, the two countries' diplomatic missions were upgraded to embassies, with Greece's representation in Bitola and North Macedonia's representation in Thessaloniki being upgraded to Consulates-General.

=== Vietnam and the United States ===
In January 1995, Vietnam and the United States established "Liaison Offices" in Washington and Hanoi, the first such diplomatic representation in the two countries since the end of the Vietnam War, when the US-backed South Vietnam fell to the Communist-controlled North. On 11 July, President Bill Clinton announced the normalisation of relations between the two countries, and the following month, both countries upgraded their Liaison Offices to Embassy status, with the United States later opening a consulate general in Ho Chi Minh City and Vietnam opening a consulate in San Francisco, California.

=== China and the United States ===
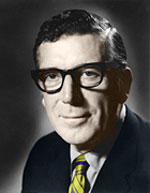
Leonard Woodcock, last Chief of the "United States Liaison Office" and first Ambassador of the United States to the People's Republic of China

Following President Richard Nixon's visit to China, the United States and the People's Republic of China agreed to open "Liaison Offices" in Washington and Beijing in 1973, described by Secretary of State Henry Kissinger as "embassies in all but name".

Although the Embassy of the Republic of China on Taiwan remained, it increasingly became overshadowed by the "Liaison Office of the People's Republic of China", which, under Executive Order 11771, was accorded the same privileges and immunities enjoyed by the diplomatic missions accredited to the United States.

George H. W. Bush, later vice-president under Ronald Reagan and President between 1989 and 1993, served as Chief of the "United States Liaison Office" in Beijing between 1974 and 1975. The last holder of the post was Leonard Woodcock, formerly president of the United Auto Workers, who became the first Ambassador when full diplomatic relations were established in 1979.

=== North Korea and South Korea ===
The joint Inter-Korean Liaison Office was established as part of Panmunjom Declaration signed by North Korean leader Kim Jong-un and South Korean President Moon Jae-in on April 27, 2018, during the 2018 inter-Korean Summit in Panmunjom. The joint liaison office provided direct communication channel for the two Koreas. The office was blown up with explosives by the DPRK at 2:50 PM local time on 16 June 2020.

=== North Korea and Japan ===
There are no diplomatic relations between the North Korea and Japan. Chongryon functions as North Korea's de facto embassy in Japan.

=== Kosovo and Serbia ===
Under the terms of the Brussels Agreement signed in 2013, the governments of Serbia and Kosovo agreed to post liaison officers in each other's capitals. The Government of Kosovo is represented in Serbia by the Liaison Office of Kosovo, Belgrade and likewise the Government of Serbia is represented in Kosovo by the Liaison Office of Serbia, Pristina. Under the terms of the Ohrid Agreement that was accepted by both parties in March 2023, the liaison offices in each country are to be upgraded to Permanent Missions.

=== Republic of Somaliland ===
The Republic of Somaliland, which claims to be the legal successor to the short-lived State of Somaliland maintains a network of liaison offices around the world. Several states also maintain missions in Somaliland.

== Interests sections ==
When two nations break off diplomatic relations, their former embassies are usually turned over to third countries that act as protecting powers. The protecting power is responsible for all diplomatic communications on behalf of the protected power. When the situation improves, the feuding countries may be willing to accept diplomats from the other country on an unofficial basis. The original embassy is known as an "interests section" of the embassy of the protecting power. For example, until 2015, the Cuban Interests Section was staffed by Cubans and located in the old Cuban Embassy in Washington, but it was officially an interests section of the Swiss Embassy to the United States.

== See also ==
- Diplomatic mission and lists of diplomatic missions
- High Commissioner (Commonwealth)
- Protecting power
- Provincial delegation (paradiplomacy)
- Representative office
- Delegation of the Ismaili Imamat
- Unrepresented Nations and Peoples Organization
