= Flag of El Salvador =

Republic of El Salvador
- Bandera Magna ("Great Flag")
- Use: State and war flag, national ensign
- Proportion: 189:335
- Adopted: 20 February 1822; 204 years ago (original design); 24 March 1916; 110 years ago (current design); 29 January 1922; 104 years ago (current use)
- Design: Horizontal triband of blue-white-blue with the national coat of arms in the center of the white stripe
- Use: Civil flag
- Proportion: 3:5 (public buildings and offices); 18:29 (parade)
- Design: Horizontal triband of blue-white-blue with the text "DIOS UNION LIBERTAD" in the center of the white stripe

The national flag of El Salvador, officially named the Bandera Magna (Spanish for "Great Flag"), is a horizontal triband of blue-white-blue, with the national coat of arms centered and entirely contained within the central white stripe. The current flag was adopted by the Legislative Assembly of El Salvador on 24 March 1916, and its design is established by the Law of National Symbols approved in 1972. The flag is inspired by the flag of the Federal Republic of Central America, which itself was inspired by the flag of Argentina. From 1865 to 1912, the flag of El Salvador resembled that of the United States, consisting of a red canton, nine alternating blue and white stripes, and white stars in the canton equal to the number of departments.

== Design ==
The official design of the flag of El Salvador was established by the Law of National Symbols passed by the Legislative Assembly of El Salvador on 14 September 1972. There are three versions of the flag: the Bandera Magna (Spanish for "Great Flag"), the "flag for use in public buildings and offices" ("bandera de uso en edificios y oficinas públicas"), and the "parade flag" ("bandera de desfiles").

The flag's base design consists of a horizontal triband of blue-white-blue. The top and bottom blue stripes symbolize the Pacific Ocean and the Atlantic Ocean; El Salvador does not have a coast on the latter, but it is intended to represent Central America as a whole. The center white stripe symbolizes peace. On the Bandera Magna, the national coat of arms is located in the center of the white stripe. Its official dimensions are 3.35 meters (11.0 ft) long by 1.89 meters (6.2 ft) tall (a ratio of 189:335), and each stripe is 0.63 meters (2.1 ft) tall. On the "flag for use in public buildings and offices", the coat of arms is replaced with the national motto of "Dios, Union, Libertad" (Spanish for "God, Union, Liberty") in gold capital letters, and the flag's dimensions are 1 meter (3.3 ft) long and 60 centimeters (24 in) tall (a ratio of 3:5). The "parade flag" is identical to the prior flag except its dimensions are 1.45 meters (4.8 ft) long and 0.9 meters (3.0 ft) tall (a ratio of 18:29).

Construction of the flag of El Salvador

== Protocol ==
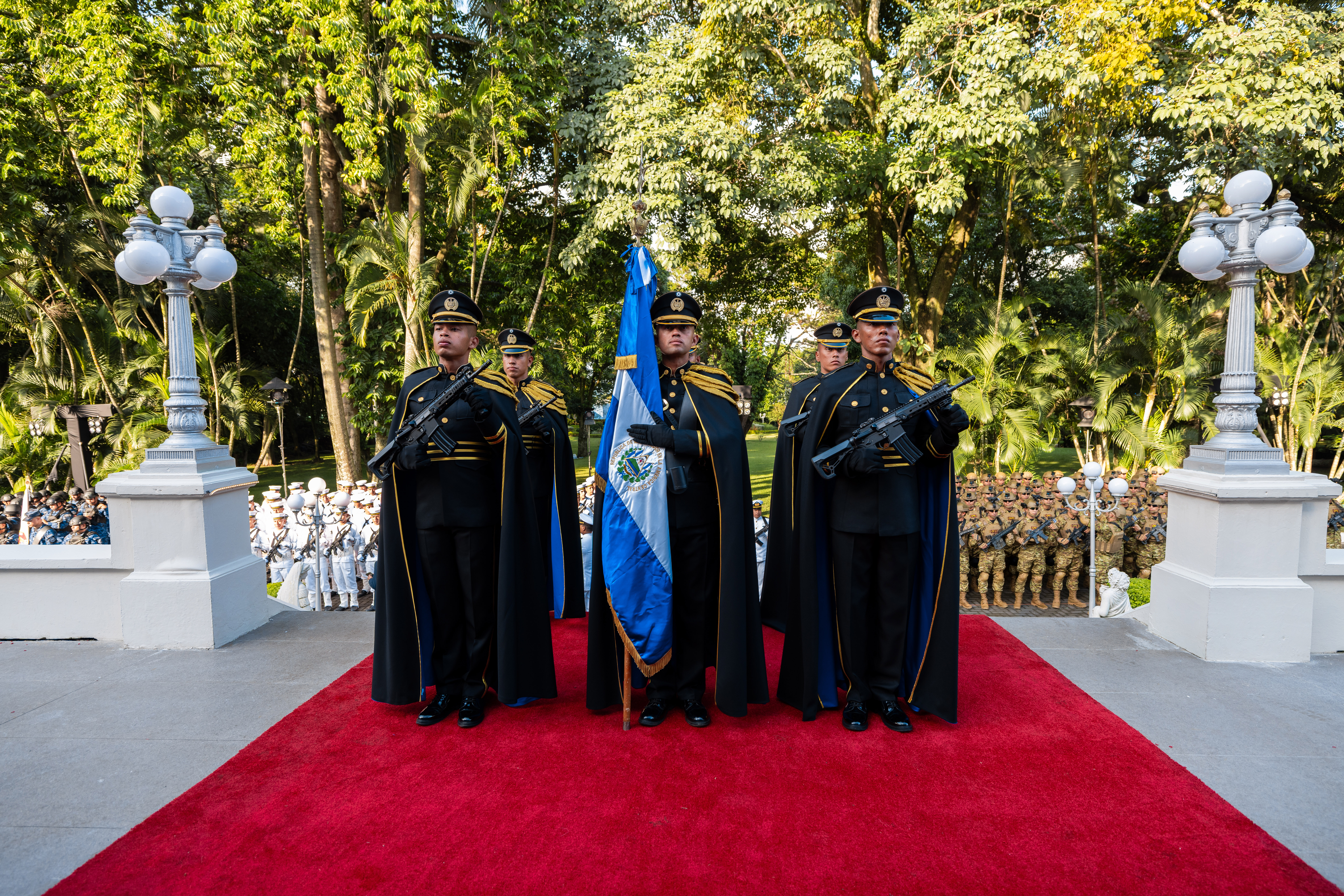
Soldiers with the "parade flag"

Each of El Salvador's flags has different protocols for its usage. The Bandera Magna is used during government sessions, meetings, or events of all three branches (legislative, executive, and judicial) or for the celebrations of national holidays. Salvadoran-registered vessels also use the Bandera Magna. The "flag for use in public buildings and offices" is used in all public buildings and offices and must be displayed in a "place of honor" ("sitio de honor"). Diplomatic delegations also use this variant of the flag. The "parade flag" must be supported by a pole with a height of 2.5 meters (8.2 ft) and a diameter of 4 centimeters (1.6 in) tipped by a diamond-shaped and gold-colored lance with two 2-meter-long (6.6 ft) ribbons (one blue and one white) attached to the junction of the pole and lance. The National Anthem of El Salvador must be played or sung whenever the Salvadoran flag is raised or lowered.

== History ==
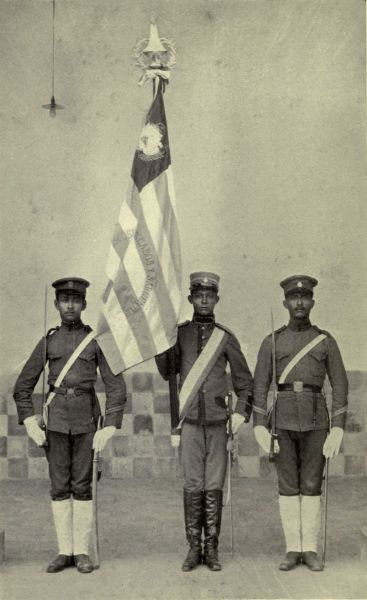
Cadets of the School for Corporals and Sergeants holding the 1875 military flag

On 20 February 1822, Salvadoran general Manuel José Arce unveiled a blue-white-blue triband inspired by the flag of Argentina in San Salvador. The flag was created by his wife, María Felipa Aranzamendi, and sister, Manuela Antonia Arce, amidst a war against efforts by the First Mexican Empire to annex Central America. El Salvador used this flag until 1865.

On 14 February 1865, the Legislative Assembly of El Salvador issued a decree that adopted a new civil and state flag consisting of nine alternating blue and white stripes and a red canton containing nine stars, each representing the country's nine departments at the time. (Note: The nine departments of El Salvador represented by the 1865 flag's nine stars were Chalatenango, Cuscatlán, La Libertad, La Paz, San Miguel, San Salvador, San Vicente, Santa Ana, and Sonsonate.) The military flag was to be the same, except on the obverse, the nine stars were replaced with the national coat of arms. President Francisco Dueñas approved the decree on 28 April 1865. The number of stars in the canton increased as the number of departments in El Salvador rose. Two stars were added later in 1865 as La Unión and Usulután were created, and one star was added in 1869, 1873, and 1875 each when Ahuachapán, Cabañas, and Morazán were established, respectively. From 1875 to 1912, the flag of El Salvador had fourteen stars. The 1865 flag resembled the flag of the United States and is known as the "conservative flag" ("bandera conservadora") as it was adopted by Dueñas' conservative government.

On 17 May 1912, the Legislative Assembly adopted the blue-white-blue triband as the national flag of El Salvador. The flag was hoisted for the first time on 15 September 1912 at the Campo de Marte in San Salvador. The flag was changed as the 1865 design too strongly resembled the flag of the United States at a time when many Salvadoran leaders held anti-imperialist views with regards to contemporary U.S. interventions in Latin America. The 1912 design was inspired by the flag of the Federal Republic of Central America, which itself was inspired by El Salvador's 1822 flag. The day after the new flag was hoisted for the first time, the Diario Del Salvador newspaper noted that the new flag strongly resembled the flag of Nicaragua, as both were blue-white-blue horizontal tribands with coats of arms depicting five volcanoes in the center. Use of the 1912 flag was briefly abolished from 15 September 1921 to 29 January 1922 when El Salvador was a member of the Federation of Central America.

== Gallery of historical flags ==
The obverse of the flag of El Salvador used by the military from 1865 to 1912

| Flag | Adopted | Relinquished | Ref. |
|---|---|---|---|
| Flag of El Salvador (1822–1865) | 20 February 1822 | 28 April 1865 | |
| Flag of El Salvador (1865) | 28 April 1865 | 1865 | |
| Flag of El Salvador (1865–1869) | 1865 | 1869 | |
| Flag of El Salvador (1869–1873) | 1869 | 1873 | |
| Flag of El Salvador (1869–1873) | 1873 | 1875 | |
| Flag of El Salvador (1875–1912) | 1875 | 17 May 1912 | |
| Flag of El Salvador (1912–1916) | 17 May 1912 | 24 March 1916 | |
| Flag of El Salvador (1916–1921) | 24 March 1916 | 15 September 1921 | |
| A blue-white-blue horizontal triband with the federal coat of arms in the center | 15 September 1921 | 29 January 1922 | |
| Flag of El Salvador (1921–present) | 29 January 1922 | In use | |
