= Timeline of national independence =

This list includes currently extant sovereign states (list) and states with limited recognition that have declared independence from a predecessor state or an occupying power. Various states have never declared independence throughout their formations and are therefore not included in the main list on this page. This includes states formed through the unification of multiple independent entities (such as the United Kingdom and Tanzania) as well as those that once declared independence but whose most recent establishment occurred through other means (such as Haiti, which declared independence from France in 1804, split into two states in 1806, and reunified in 1820). These countries are given on a separate list below. The list does not include duplicated entries for states that have declared independence multiple times, only using the most recent one. Subnational entities are usually not included in the list. Some of these dates of independence might be disputed, as many of them are not the official independence days nationally recognized as such.

== List ==
=== After first century AD ===
Date	Previous entity	Newly independent entity	Event
September 3, 301	Roman Empire	San Marino	Traditionally given date.
August 10, 843	Carolingian Empire	France	Treaty of Verdun, splitting the Frankish Empire into three states, one of which became France.
June 6, 1523	Kalmar Union	Sweden	Election of King Gustav Vasa as King of Sweden, marking a definite secession from the Kalmar Union. Initial establishment in 970.
December 1, 1640	Spain	Portugal	Start of the Portuguese Restoration War that reestablished Portugal as a sovereign state, thus ending the Iberian Union with Spain. Initial establishment in 868.
February 8, 1649	Holy Roman Empire	Switzerland	Separated from Imperial sovereignty by the Peace of Westphalia. Initial establishment in 1291.
September 3, 1783	Great Britain	United States	Treaty of Paris is signed. Initial independence in 1776.

=== 19th century to World War I ===
Date	Previous entity	Newly independent entity	Event
May 14, 1811	Spain	Paraguay	Independence not formally declared until 1842.
November 4, 1813	Confederation of the Rhine	Liechtenstein	Confederation of the Rhine dissolved. Initial establishment in 1719 within the Holy Roman Empire.
November 20, 1813	France	Netherlands	Independence restored after French rule. Initial independence from Spain in 1579 during the Eighty Years' War.
May 30, 1814	France	Andorra	Independence restored after French rule. Initial independence from Urgell in 1278.
May 30, 1814	France	Monaco	Independence restored after French rule. Initial independence from Genoa in 1297, interrupted by multiple Genoese occupations.
July 9, 1816	Spain	Argentina	Originally named United Provinces of the Río de la Plata until the signing of the Federal Pact in 1831. Initial independence in 1810.
February 12, 1818	Spain	Chile	Independence restored after Spanish reconquest, initial independence in 1810.
September 28, 1821	Spain	Mexico	Unrecognized by Spain until 1836 with the signing of the Santa María–Calatrava Treaty.
January 4, 1822	Ottoman Empire	Greece	International recognition achieved in 1830.
September 7, 1822	Portugal	Brazil	Unrecognized by Portugal until 1825.
October 4, 1828	Brazil	Uruguay	Independence established by the Treaty of Montevideo as a buffer between Brazil and Argentina, which both previously claimed the region.
October 4, 1828	Netherlands	Belgium	Unrecognized by Netherlands until 1839.
November 19, 1832	Gran Colombia	Colombia	Dissolution of Gran Colombia. Originally named Republic of New Granada until the signing of the Constitution of Rionegro in 1863.
November 19, 1832	Gran Colombia	Ecuador	Dissolution of Gran Colombia.
November 19, 1832	Gran Colombia	Venezuela	Dissolution of Gran Colombia. Restoration of Independence, initial establishment in 1811.
November 15, 1838	Central America	Costa Rica	Originally the Free State of Costa Rica, it would become the Republic of Costa Rica in 1847.
June 19, 1839	Belgium	Luxembourg	Grand Duchy re-established by the Treaty of London in personal union with the Netherlands (until 1890).
August 25, 1839	Peru-Bolivia Confederation	Bolivia	Restoration of Independence, initial establishment in 1825.
August 25, 1839	Peru-Bolivia Confederation	Peru	Restoration of Independence, initial establishment in 1821.
July 26, 1847	United States	Liberia	Unrecognized by United States until 1862.
May 1, 1865	Spain	Dominican Republic	Independence restored after period of Spanish rule. Initial independence declared from Spain in 1821, and later from Haiti in 1844.
March 17, 1878	Ottoman Empire	Bulgaria	Under Ottoman vassalage until 1908. Restoration of independence after Ottoman rule, initial establishment in 681.
November 29, 1898	Central America	Nicaragua	Independence restored after the dissolution of the Greater Republic of Central America, initial independence in 1838.
May 20, 1902	United States	Cuba	United States retained Isla de Pinos until 1925. Guantanamo Bay was leased to the United States in 1903 and has remained under American control into the present.
November 4, 1903	Colombia	Panama	Unrecognized by Colombia until 1922.
June 7, 1905	Sweden	Norway	Independence restored after Danish and Swedish rule. Initial establishment in 872.
November 28, 1912	Ottoman Empire	Albania	Independence restored after Ottoman rule. Initial establishment in 1190.
December 6, 1917	Russia	Finland	Sovereignty secured in 1918 with the defeat of communist insurgents.
October 7, 1918	Germany; Austria-Hungary; Russia	Poland	Independence restored after German, Austrian, and Russian partitions. Initial establishment in 960. Germany withdrew on November 11.
October 31, 1918	Austria-Hungary	Hungary	Independence restored with the dissolution of Austria-Hungary. Initial establishment in 895. Stayed in personal union with Austria until November 16.

=== Interwar period to World War II ===
Date	Previous entity	Newly independent entity	Event
December 1, 1918	Denmark	Iceland	In personal union with Denmark until 1944. Initial establishment in 930.
August 19, 1919	United Kingdom	Afghanistan	Anglo-Afghan Treaty of 1919 signed between the United Kingdom and Afghanistan during the Third Anglo-Afghan War, ending 40 years of British protectorate in the country. Initial establishment in 1747.
February 15, 1921	Republic of China	Mongolia	Independence restored after Chinese occupation. Initial establishment of first Mongolian state in 1203.
January 14, 1922	Central America	El Salvador	Independence restored after brief attempt at reunifying Central America, initial independence in 1841.
January 14, 1922	Central America	Guatemala	Independence restored after brief attempt at reunifying Central America, initial independence in 1839.
January 14, 1922	Central America	Honduras	Independence restored after brief attempt at reunifying Central America, initial independence in 1838.
March 15, 1922	United Kingdom	Egypt	Independence restored after a period of British rule. Initial establishment around 3150 BC. Egypt would remain under strong British influence until 1952, when the monarchy was abolished and replaced by a republic.
June 7, 1929	Italy	Vatican City	Established by the Lateran Treaty. Initial establishment in 756.
December 11, 1931	United Kingdom	Canada	Passing of the Statute of Westminster 1931 which recognized the autonomy of British dominions. In personal union with the UK and many other countries.
December 11, 1931	United Kingdom	Ireland	Passing of the Statute of Westminster 1931 which recognized the autonomy of British dominions. In personal union with Britain until 1937. Initial establishment of first state called Ireland in 1177.
December 11, 1931	United Kingdom	South Africa	Passing of the Statute of Westminster 1931 which recognized the autonomy of British dominions. In personal union with the UK and many other countries until 1961.
October 3, 1932	United Kingdom	Iraq	Formerly a League of Nations mandate.
May 5, 1941	Italy	Ethiopia	Independence restored after Italian occupation. Initial establishment in 1270.
October 9, 1942	United Kingdom	Australia	Passing of the Statute of Westminster Adoption Act 1942 which recognized the autonomy of British dominions. In personal union with the UK and many other countries.
December 22, 1943	France	Lebanon	Formerly a League of Nations mandate.
December 22, 1943	France	Syria	Formerly a League of Nations mandate. Unrecognized by France until 1946.
August 15, 1945	Japan	North Korea	Independence restored after Japanese occupation as the Democratic People's Republic of Korea/Chosŏn. The country was partitioned along the 38th parallel by the Allied powers. Created in 1948 from the Soviet occupation zone in the north of the peninsula. Initial establishment in 2333 BC.
August 15, 1945	Japan	South Korea	Independence restored after Japanese occupation as the Republic of Korea/Hanguk. The country was partitioned along the 38th parallel by the Allied powers. Created in 1948 from the American occupation zone in the south of the peninsula. Initial establishment in 2333 BC.
August 17, 1945	Netherlands	Indonesia	Unrecognized by Netherlands until 1949. In personal union with the Netherlands until 1956.

=== Cold War ===
Date	Previous entity	Newly independent entity	Event
March 2, 1946	United Kingdom; Soviet Union	Iran	Withdrawal of British troops from Iran following invasion and occupation in 1941, although Soviet troops wouldn't withdraw until May 1946. Initial establishment in 678 BC. The monarchy would be overthrown in 1979 and replaced by the Islamic Republic of Iran.
June 17, 1946	United Kingdom	Jordan	Previously a League of Nations Mandate.
July 4, 1946	United States	Philippines	Restoration of Independence after American rule. Initial independence in 1897.
August 14, 1947	United Kingdom	Pakistan	In personal union with the UK and many other countries until 1956.
August 15, 1947	United Kingdom	India	In personal union with the UK and many other countries until 1950.
November 25, 1947	United Kingdom	New Zealand	Passing of the Statute of Westminster Adoption Act 1947 which recognized the autonomy of British dominions. In personal union with the UK and many other countries.
January 4, 1948	United Kingdom	Myanmar	Independence restored after British rule. Originally named Burma until 1989. Initial establishment in 849.
February 4, 1948	United Kingdom	Sri Lanka	Originally named Ceylon until 1972. In personal union with the UK and many other countries until 1972.
May 14, 1948	United Kingdom	Israel	Previously a League of Nations mandate. Partially unrecognized. Initial establishment in 1047 BC.
October 1, 1948	United Kingdom	Palestine	Previously a League of Nations mandate, although it existed as a proxy of Egypt from 1948 to 1959. Mostly unrecognized. The "Palestinian state" was proclaimed in 1988 and claims limited control over the territory that is under Israeli occupation since 1967. Under the Oslo Accords, it had gained limited support from Israel. Initial name reference in 135.
October 1, 1949	Republic of China	China	Independence declared from the Republic of China, whose government was relocated and territory reduced to Taiwan and surrounding islands. Tibet would be annexed in 1951. Initial establishment in 2070 BC.
December 24, 1951	United Kingdom; France	Libya	Created by merging French and British-occupied areas in Libya with the independent Emirate of Cyrenaica. Initial establishment in 1551.
October 22, 1953	France	Laos	In 1975, the Pathet Lao, a left-wing revolutionary force in the Kingdom of Laos, takeover the country and abolish the monarchy, becoming a communist state, the Lao People's Democratic Republic. Initial establishment in 1353.
November 9, 1953	France	Cambodia	Independence restored after French protectorate status. Initial establishment in 802.
July 27, 1955	United Kingdom; France; Soviet Union; United States	Austria	Independence restored after liberation from German occupation by the Allied powers in accordance with the terms of the Austrian State Treaty. Initial establishment in 970 within the Holy Roman Empire. The Allies withdrew on October 25.
January 1, 1956	United Kingdom; Egypt	Sudan	Independence granted during the First Sudanese Civil War. Initial establishment in 1885.
March 20, 1956	France	Tunisia	Independence restored after period as a French protectorate. Initial establishment in 1705.
March 6, 1957	United Kingdom	Ghana	In personal union with the UK and many other countries until 1960.
August 14, 1957	France	Morocco	Independence restored after French protectorate. Initial establishment in 788.
October 2, 1958	France	Guinea	Joined the UN on December 12.
January 1, 1960	France	Cameroon	Joined the UN on September 20.
April 27, 1960	France	Togo	Joined the UN on September 20.
June 20, 1960	France	Mali	Senegal declares independence on August 20.
June 26, 1960	France	Madagascar	Independence restored after French rule, initial establishment as Kingdom of Madagascar in 1540.
June 30, 1960	Belgium	DR Congo	Named Zaire from 1971 to 1997.
July 1, 1960	Italy	Somalia	Somaliland secedes in 1991. Puntland secedes in 2024.
July 31, 1960	France	Benin	Originally named Dahomey until 1975.
August 5, 1960	France	Burkina Faso	Originally named Upper Volta until 1984.
August 7, 1960	France	Côte d'Ivoire	Originally named Ivory Coast until 1986.
August 8, 1960	France	Niger	Joined the UN on September 20.
August 11, 1960	France	Chad	Joined the UN on September 20.
August 13, 1960	France	Central African Republic	Central African Empire from 1976 to 1979.
August 15, 1960	France	Republic of the Congo	Also known as the Congo Republic.
August 16, 1960	United Kingdom	Cyprus	Initial establishment in 1192.
August 17, 1960	France	Gabon	Joined the UN on September 20.
October 1, 1960	United Kingdom	Nigeria	In personal union with the UK and many other countries until 1963.
November 28, 1960	France	Mauritania	Joined the UN in 1961.
April 27, 1961	United Kingdom	Sierra Leone	In personal union with the UK and many other countries until 1971.
June 19, 1961	United Kingdom	Kuwait	Independence restored after period of British protectorate. Initial independence in 1752.
January 1, 1962	New Zealand	Samoa	Independence restored after German and New Zealand rule. Initial establishment in 1300.
July 1, 1962	Belgium	Burundi	Independence restored after German and Belgian protectorate. Initial establishment in 1680.
July 1, 1962	Belgium	Rwanda	Independence restored after German and Belgian protectorate. Initial establishment in the 12th century.
July 5, 1962	France	Algeria	Independence restored after French colonial rule. Initial establishment in 1516.
August 6, 1962	United Kingdom	Jamaica	In personal union with the UK and many other countries.
August 31, 1962	United Kingdom	Trinidad and Tobago	In personal union with the UK and many other countries until 1976.
October 9, 1962	United Kingdom	Uganda	In personal union with the UK and many other countries until 1963.
December 12, 1963	United Kingdom	Kenya	In personal union with the UK and many other countries until 1964.
July 6, 1964	United Kingdom	Malawi	In personal union with the UK and many other countries until 1966.
September 21, 1964	United Kingdom	Malta	Independence restored after French and British rule. Initial independence in 1520. In personal union with the UK and many other countries until 1974.
October 24, 1964	United Kingdom	Zambia	Joined the UN on December 1.
July 26, 1965	United Kingdom	Maldives	Independence restored after British protectorate. Initial establishment circa 1117.
August 4, 1965	New Zealand	Cook Islands	Partially unrecognized. In personal union with the UK and many other countries. In free association with New Zealand.
August 9, 1965	Malaysia	Singapore	Forcibly expelled from Malaysia. Initial establishment in 1299.
May 26, 1966	United Kingdom	Guyana	In personal union with the UK and many other countries until 1970.
September 30, 1966	United Kingdom	Botswana	Joined the UN on October 17.
October 4, 1966	United Kingdom	Lesotho	Independence restored after period of British protectorate. Initial establishment in 1822.
November 30, 1966	United Kingdom	Barbados	In personal union with the UK and many other countries until 2021.
January 31, 1968	Australia	Nauru	Joined the UN in 1999.
March 12, 1968	United Kingdom	Mauritius	In personal union with the UK and many other countries until 1992.
September 6, 1968	United Kingdom	Eswatini	Restoration of independence after British protectorate, initial establishment in 1745. Originally named Swaziland until 2018.
October 12, 1968	Spain	Equatorial Guinea	Joined the UN on November 12.
June 4, 1970	United Kingdom	Tonga	Independence restored after British protectorate. Initial independence declared from Tui Manu'a in 950.
August 9, 1970	United Kingdom	Oman	Independence restored after informal British protectorate. Initial independence declared from Abbasid Caliphate in 749.
October 10, 1970	United Kingdom	Fiji	Restoration of independence after British colonial rule. Initial establishment in 1871. In personal union with the UK and many other countries until 1987.
August 15, 1971	United Kingdom	Bahrain	Independence restored after British protectorate. Initial independence in 1783.
September 3, 1971	United Kingdom	Qatar	Independence restored after British protectorate. Initial independence in 1868.
December 2, 1971	United Kingdom	United Arab Emirates	Ras Al Khaimah originally not part of the union, joined in 1972.
December 16, 1971	Pakistan	Bangladesh	Unrecognized by Pakistan until 1974.
July 10, 1973	United Kingdom	Bahamas	In personal union with the UK and many other countries.
September 24, 1973	Portugal	Guinea-Bissau	Joined the UN in 1974.
February 7, 1974	United Kingdom	Grenada	In personal union with the UK and many other countries.
October 19, 1974	New Zealand	Niue	Independence restored after British and New Zealand rule. Initial establishment before 1887. Partially unrecognized. In personal union with the UK and many other countries. In free association with New Zealand.
June 25, 1975	Portugal	Mozambique	Joined the UN on September 16.
July 5, 1975	Portugal	Cabo Verde	Joined the UN on September 16.
July 6, 1975	France	Comoros	Joined the UN on November 12.
July 12, 1975	Portugal	São Tomé and Príncipe	Joined the UN on September 16.
September 16, 1975	Australia	Papua New Guinea	In personal union with the UK and many other countries.
November 11, 1975	Portugal	Angola	Joined the UN in 1976.
November 25, 1975	Netherlands	Suriname	Joined the UN on December 4.
February 27, 1976	Spain	Sahrawi Arab Democratic Republic	Partially unrecognized.
June 29, 1976	United Kingdom	Seychelles	Joined the UN on September 21.
June 27, 1977	France	Djibouti	Joined the UN on September 20.
July 7, 1978	United Kingdom	Solomon Islands	In personal union with the UK and many other countries.
October 1, 1978	United Kingdom	Tuvalu	In personal union with the UK and many other countries.
November 3, 1978	United Kingdom	Dominica	Joined the UN on December 18.
February 22, 1979	United Kingdom	Saint Lucia	In personal union with the UK and many other countries.
July 12, 1979	United Kingdom	Kiribati	Joined the UN in 1999.
October 27, 1979	United Kingdom	Saint Vincent and the Grenadines	In personal union with the UK and many other countries.
April 18, 1980	United Kingdom	Zimbabwe	Restoration of independence after a brief return to British rule after the Rhodesian Bush War, which abolished the predecessor state of Rhodesia that was established in 1965. Initial establishment in the 13th century.
July 7, 1980	United Kingdom; France	Vanuatu	Joined the UN in 1981.
September 21, 1981	United Kingdom	Belize	In personal union with the UK and many other countries.
November 1, 1981	United Kingdom	Antigua and Barbuda	In personal union with the UK and many other countries.
September 19, 1983	United Kingdom	Saint Kitts and Nevis	In personal union with the UK and many other countries.
November 15, 1983	Cyprus	Northern Cyprus	Largely unrecognized.
January 1, 1984	United Kingdom	Brunei	Independence restored after British protectorate. Initial establishment in 1368.
September 30, 1989	Senegambia	Gambia	Initial independence in 1965 from British rule, but would remain in personal union with the UK and many other countries until 1970.
September 30, 1989	Senegambia	Senegal	Initial independence in 1960 from Mali.
March 11, 1990	Soviet Union	Lithuania	Independence restored after Russian and Soviet rule. Initial establishment in 1236. Not official until the formal disestablishment of the Soviet Union.
March 21, 1990	South Africa	Namibia	Joined the UN on April 23.
May 4, 1990	Soviet Union	Latvia	Independence restored after Soviet rule. Initial establishment in 1918. Not official until the formal disestablishment of the Soviet Union.
May 8, 1990	Soviet Union	Estonia	Independence restored after Soviet rule. Initial establishment in 1918. Not official until the formal disestablishment of the Soviet Union.
December 22, 1990	United States	Marshall Islands	In free association with the United States.
December 22, 1990	United States	Federated States of Micronesia	In free association with the United States.
April 9, 1991	Soviet Union	Georgia	Independence restored after Russian and Soviet rule. Initial establishment in 302 BC. Not official until the formal disestablishment of the Soviet Union.
May 18, 1991	Somalia	Somaliland	Largely unrecognized. Independence restored after unification with Somalia. Initial independence from the United Kingdom in 1960.
May 29 1993	Ethiopia	Eritrea	Unrecognized by Ethiopia until 1993.
March 21 1996 and June 6 1992	Yugoslavia	Croatia	Independence restored after Hungarian, Habsburg, and Yugoslav rule. Initial establishment in the 7th century.
March 21 1996 and June 6 1992	Yugoslavia	Slovenia	Independence secured on July 7 after victory in Ten-Day War.
August 24, 1991	Soviet Union	Ukraine	Independence restored after Russian and Soviet rule. Initial establishment in 1649. Not official until the formal disestablishment of the Soviet Union.
August 25, 1991	Soviet Union	Belarus	Independence restored after Soviet rule. Initial establishment in 1918. Not official until the formal disestablishment of the Soviet Union.
August 27, 1991	Soviet Union	Moldova	Independence restored after Russian and Soviet rule. Initial establishment in 1346. Not official until the formal disestablishment of the Soviet Union.
August 31, 1991	Soviet Union	Kyrgyzstan	Not official until the formal disestablishment of the Soviet Union.
September 1, 1991	Soviet Union	Uzbekistan	Not official until the formal disestablishment of the Soviet Union.
September 9, 1991	Soviet Union	Tajikistan	Not official until the formal disestablishment of the Soviet Union.
November 16 2007	Yugoslavia	North Macedonia	Originally named Macedonia until 2019.
September 21, 1991	Soviet Union	Armenia	Independence restored after Russian and Soviet rule. Initial establishment in 331 BC. Not official until the formal disestablishment of the Soviet Union.
October 18, 1991	Soviet Union	Azerbaijan	Independence restored after Soviet rule. Initial establishment in 1918. Not official until the formal disestablishment of the Soviet Union.
October 27, 1991	Soviet Union	Turkmenistan	Not official until the formal disestablishment of the Soviet Union.
November 5, 1991	Soviet Union	Transnistria	Not official until the formal disestablishment of the Soviet Union. Largely unrecognized.
December 16, 1991	Soviet Union	Kazakhstan	Independence restored after Russian and Soviet rule. Initial establishment in 1465. Not official until the formal disestablishment of the Soviet Union.
December 21, 1991	Georgia	South Ossetia	Restoration of independence after Georgian, Russian, and Soviet rule. Initial establishment in the late 9th century. Not official until the formal disestablishment of the Soviet Union. Largely unrecognized.

=== Post–Cold War ===
Date	Previous entity	Newly independent entity	Event
March 3, 1992	Yugoslavia	Bosnia and Herzegovina	Restoration of independence after Ottoman, Habsburg, Yugoslav, and Croatian rule. Initial establishment in 1154.
May 19, 1992	Iraq	Kurdistan	Largely unrecognized.
July 23, 1992	Georgia	Abkhazia	Restoration of independence after Georgian, Russian, and Soviet rule. Initial establishment in 778. Largely unrecognized.
January 1, 1993	Czechoslovakia	Czechia	Dissolution of Czechoslovakia. Initial establishment in 870.
January 1, 1993	Czechoslovakia	Slovakia	Dissolution of Czechoslovakia. Initial establishment in 1939.
October 1, 1994	United States	Palau	In free association with the United States.
May 20, 2002	Indonesia	Timor-Leste	Independence restored after Indonesian occupation. Also known as East Timor. Initial independence in 1975.
June 3, 2006	Serbia and Montenegro	Montenegro	Independence restored after Yugoslav union. Initial establishment in 1516.
June 5, 2006	Serbia and Montenegro	Serbia	Sovereignty confirmed and continuity of the preceding state union maintained. Initial establishment in 780.
June 14, 2007	Israel and Palestine	Gaza	Effectively operating as a separate state since Hamas takeover of government. Largely unrecognized. Initial establishment in 15th century BC.
February 17, 2008	Serbia	Kosovo	Previously existed from 1991 to 2000 as a proto-state, Kosova. Partially unrecognized.
August 20, 2010	Myanmar	Wa State	Largely unrecognized.
July 9, 2011	Sudan	South Sudan	Most recently recognized sovereign nation and 193rd UN member.
September 21, 2014	Yemen	Houthi Yemen	Effectively operating as a separate state since Houthis takeover of government. Largely unrecognized.
October 1, 2017	Cameroon	Ambazonia	Largely unrecognized.
December 6, 2023	Myanmar	Chinland	Largely unrecognized.
April 1, 2024	Somalia	Puntland	Largely unrecognized.
January 5, 2026	Myanmar	Kawthoolei	Largely unrecognized.

=== Timeline of states established by means other than declaring independence ===
Date	Previous entity	Newly established entity	Event
December 5, 539	Yamatai; Kununokuni; Nakoku; Other small Japanese states	Japan	Origins of the Japanese state are largely unknown. Traditional foundation date by Emperor Jimmu in 660 BC. Emperor Kinmei is largely considered to be the earliest historically attested non-legendary emperor of Japan, began his reign c. 539 AD. Hokkaido would be annexed in 1869, and the Ryukyu Islands would be annexed in 1879.
January 19, 1479	Crown of Castile; Crown of Aragon	Spain	Exactly when Spain was united is debated, the date given here is when Ferdinand II of Aragon, husband to Isabella I of Castile, ascended to the Aragonese throne and the Catholic Monarchs began to govern Spain as a de facto single realm. Legally, Castile and Aragon maintained separate institutions until the Nueva Planta Decrees issued between 1707 and 1716, and Navarre maintained separate institutions until 1841.
September 29, 1768	Gorkha Kingdom; 29 small Nepalese kingdoms	Nepal	Prithvi Narayan Shah declares the establishment of the Kingdom of Nepal. Unification campaign continues to 1795 with the annexation of the Kingdom of Mustan. Subject to a de facto British protectorate from 1816 to 1923.
March 15, 1776	Thonburi; Phimai; Phitsanulok; Sawangkhaburi; Nakhon Si Thammarat	Thailand	Completion of the reunification of Siam by Taksin the Great. Initial establishment in 1238.
January 1, 1801	Kingdom of Great Britain; Kingdom of Ireland	United Kingdom	Acts of Union 1800 come into effect. Southern Ireland secedes in 1922.
January 14, 1814	Denmark–Norway	Denmark	Treaty of Kiel which ceded Norway to Sweden after Denmark lost the War of the Sixth Coalition. Iceland would gain independence in 1918. Initial establishment in 936.
October 26, 1820	North Haiti; South Haiti	Haiti	Haiti reunified after division following the death of Jean-Jacques Dessalines. Initial independence from France declared in 1804.
January 24, 1859	Moldavia; Wallachia	Romania	Ottoman vassal until 1877. Transylvania and Bukovina would be annexed in 1918.
March 17, 1861	Kingdom of Sardinia; United Provinces of Central Italy; Kingdom of the Two Sicilies	Kingdom of Italy	Proclamation of the Kingdom of Italy by Law No. 4761 of 1861. Venetia would be annexed in 1866, and Rome would be captured in 1870.
December 17, 1907	Trongsa; Paro; Punakha; Wangdue Phodrang; Daga; Bumthang; Thimphu; Kurtoed; Kurmaed	Bhutan	Reunification of Bhutan under King Ugyen Wangchuck following centuries of civil wars resulting from power struggles created by the traditional diarchy. Subject to a de facto British protectorate from 1910 to 1947, and a de facto Indian protectorate from 1947 to 1971. Initial independence declared from Tibet in 1616.
October 29, 1923	Ottoman Empire	Turkey	Declaration of the Republic of Turkey, superseding the previous Ottoman state. Hatay would be annexed in 1939.
December 22, 1932	Kingdom of Hejaz and Nejd; Idrisid Emirate of Asir	Saudi Arabia	Abolition of the dual monarchy of Nejd and Hejaz, which is superseded by the Kingdom of Saudi Arabia.
October 25, 1945	Republic of China	Taiwan	Handover of Formosa on Retrocession Day by the Japanese Empire to the Republic of China, which has ruled the island ever since, having been exiled from the mainland after losing the Chinese Civil War. Largely unrecognized.
September 16, 1963	Malaya; Sarawak; Sabah; Singapore	Malaysia	Merger of three former British colonies into a single federation by the Malaysia Agreement. Singapore would leave the union in 1965.
April 26, 1964	Tanganyika; Zanzibar	Tanzania	Creation of Tanzania, whose name is a portmanteau of "Tan" from Tanganyika and "Zan" from Zanzibar, which was mutually accepted by both the Nyerere government and the Revolutionary Government of Zanzibar.
July 2, 1976	North Vietnam; South Vietnam	Vietnam	Reunified following the Vietnam War. The communist-led Democratic Republic of Vietnam declared independence in 1945. The anti-communist State of Vietnam was granted nominal independence in 1949. Initial establishment in 2879 BC.
May 22, 1990	North Yemen; South Yemen	Yemen	Yemeni unification following colonial-era division between Kingdom of Yemen and Aden Protectorate. Initial establishment in 110 BC.
October 3, 1990	East Germany; West Germany	Germany	Germany reunified after Cold War-era division. Initial unification in 1871.
December 25, 1991	Soviet Union	Russia	Supersedes the Soviet Union under international law, although the Russian SFSR declared independence on December 12. Initial establishment in 1547.

== See also ==
- Age of Revolution
- Decolonization
- Human history
- List of national independence days
- List of sovereign states by date of formation
- List of wars of independence
- Modern era
- National revival
- Wars of national liberation
