= List of modern sovereign states by date of formation =

Below is a list of sovereign states with the dates of their formation (date of their independence) and date of their current form of government (their constitution), this later sorted by continent.

This list includes the 195 states which are currently member states of the United Nations or non-member observer states with the United Nations General Assembly as well as partially-recognized non-member Kosovo. This does not include extinct states, but does include several states with limited recognition. (Note: Listed are the six UN member states with limited recognition: China (Bhutan neither recognizes PRC nor ROC; the ROC was recognized as a sovereign country by just 11 countries and Vatican City/Holy See as of Jan 2024), Israel (not recognized by 32 members), North and South Korea (no mutual recognition), and Cyprus (not recognized by Turkey).)

For proposed states or various indigenous nations which consider themselves still under occupation, see list of active autonomist and secessionist movements.

Nation-building is a long evolutionary process, and in most cases the date of a country's "formation" cannot be objectively determined; e.g., the fact that England and France were sovereign kingdoms on equal footing in the medieval period does not prejudice the fact that England is not now a sovereign state (having passed sovereignty to Great Britain in 1707), while France is a republic founded in 1870 (though the term France generally refers to the current French Fifth Republic government, formed in 1958).

Around 60 countries have gained independence from the United Kingdom throughout its history, the most in the world, followed by around 40 countries that have gained independence from France throughout its history. Over 50% of the world's borders today were drawn as a result of British and French imperialism. Many countries have gained independence from other Western European empires, including 23 from Spain, 7 from Portugal, 4 from the Netherlands, 3 from Belgium, and 2 from Italy.

An unambiguous measure is the date of national constitutions; but as constitutions are an almost entirely modern concept, all formation dates by that criterion are modern or early modern (the oldest extant constitution being that of San Marino, dating to 1600).

Independence dates for widely recognized states earlier than 1919 should be treated with caution, since prior to the founding of the League of Nations, there was no international body to recognize nationhood, and independence had no meaning beyond mutual recognition of de facto sovereigns (the role of the League of Nations was effectively taken over by the United Nations after the Second World War). See Disputed territories.

The following list contains the formation dates of countries with a short description of formation events. For a more detailed description of a country's formation and history, please see the main article for that country.

== Sortable list ==
In this list, "date of last subordination" refers to the last date of control by an external government. The list takes into account the existence of states (and their predecessor states) in an independent and continuous manner, ignoring historical periods in which states existed in the territories of the current states that were extinguished through conquest and annexation. Periods of colonial rule are also not counted. Foreign military occupations are included when the occupying nation does not have the objective of annexation or when a government in exile exists.

The list shows large groupings associated with the dates of independence from decolonization (e.g., 41 current states gained control of sovereignty from the United Kingdom and France between 1956 and 1966) or dissolution of a political union (e.g., 21 current states gained control of sovereignty from the Soviet Union, Czechoslovakia and Yugoslavia between 1990 and 2008). In other cases, a sovereign state submitted to foreign military occupation or political subjugation for a period of time and later regained its independence (e.g., 6 current states gained control of sovereignty from Nazi Germany between 1944 and 1945).

Dates refer to de facto rule or occupation of the major territory, whether or not legitimized by international recognition.

In a defunct union such as Czechoslovakia, Yugoslavia, Poland-Lithuania, the Soviet Union, or the Kalmar Union, one of the successor constituents can be considered the dominant power – generally where the seat of government was located. In an existent union like the United Kingdom, Spain, or Belgium, the state's collective history begins with the formation of the union, while the histories of its constituents (Scotland, Catalonia, Flanders, etc.) are considered separate prior to unification.

There are cases where a state is completely extinguished or abolished without having any successor states. Cases like this occur when, for example, one state is annexed or conquered by another and ceases to exist even in nominal form (i.e., not even a "government in exile" is established). The most recent case in human history is the German Democratic Republic (East Germany or GDR), which was completely abolished after the German reunification in 1990. Modern Germany is a reunification of the GDR into the Federal Republic of Germany, not a GDR successor state.

This list has the date of creation of current sovereign states but not of nations (for example there are even stateless nations). The historiography of some nations, such as the Bulgarians, even separates the different states founded by these nations (for example First, Second and Third Bulgarian State)

| Country | Continent | Acquisition of full sovereignty | Date of last subordination | Previous governing power | Historical Notes |
|---|---|---|---|---|---|
| Afghanistan | Asia | 1823 | 30 Aug 2021 | Durrani Empire; United States | 2021–present: Islamic Emirate of Afghanistan (de facto) 2004–2021: Islamic Republic of Afghanistan (de jure; internationally recognized Government); 2002–2004: Transitional Islamic State of Afghanistan; 1996–2001: Islamic Emirate of Afghanistan; 2001–2021: American Occupation; 1992–2002: Islamic State of Afghanistan (Note: controlled only a small part of the country from 1996 to 2001, but still recognized by the UN and most of the world's countries as the legitimate government of Afghanistan); 1987–1992: Republic of Afghanistan; 1978–1987: Democratic Republic of Afghanistan; 1973–1978: (Republic of Afghanistan (1973–1978)) Republic of Afghanistan; 1926–1973: Kingdom of Afghanistan; 1823–1926: Emirate of Afghanistan |
| Albania | Europe | 28 Nov 1912 | 29 Nov 1944 | Germany | 1992–present: Republic of Albania 1946–92: People's Socialist Republic of Albania; 1944–46: Democratic Government of Albania; 1943–44: Albanian Kingdom, independent country militarly occupied by (Nazi Germany) Germany; 1939–43: Kingdom of Albania, a monarchy in personal union with (Kingdom of Italy) Italy as the 1928–39: Albanian Kingdom; 1925–1928: Albanian Republic; 1914–1925: Principality of Albania (via Albanian Declaration of Independence); 1912–1914: Independent Albania |
| Algeria | Africa | 3 July 1962 | 3 July 1962 | France | 1962–present: People's Democratic Republic of Algeria (via Évian Accords) |
| Andorra | Europe | 7 Sep 1278 | 14 Nov 1944 | France | 1278–present: Principality of Andorra (via Paréage of Andorra; occupied by France 1812–13, 1870, 1914, 1936, 1939, 1944) |
| Angola | Africa | 11 Nov 1975 | 11 Nov 1975 | Portugal | 1992–present: Republic of Angola; 1975–1992: People's Republic of Angola (via the Alvor Agreement) |
| Antigua and Barbuda | The Americas | 1 Nov 1981 | 1 Nov 1981 | United Kingdom | 1981–present: Antigua and Barbuda, a monarchy in personal union with the United Kingdom |
| Argentina | The Americas | 25 May 1810 | 9 July 1816 | Spain | 1861–present: (Argentina) Argentine Republic, a federation 1831–1861: Argentine Confederation (Note: Despite bearing the name "confederation", the Argentine Confederation was viewed internationally by its contemporaries as a single sovereign state, with a central government in charge of foreign relations.); 1816–1830: United Provinces of South America (Note: On 9 July 1816, the Congress of Tucumán issued the formal Declaration of Independence); 1810–1816: United Provinces of the Río de la Plata, monarchy in personal union with Spain |
| Armenia | Asia/Europe | 23 Sep 1991 | 23 Sep 1991 | Soviet Union | 1991–present: Republic of Armenia |
| Australia | Oceania | 9 Oct 1942 (Note: Full sovereignty. Adoption of the Statute of Westminster 1931) | 9 Oct 1942 | United Kingdom | 1942–present: Commonwealth of Australia, a Federation and a monarchy in personal union with the United Kingdom |
| Austria | Europe | 970 (Note: Austrians date their national identity back to the establishment of the Margraviate of Austria (later the Duchy of Austria and then the Archduchy of Austria) in 970 AD, this being a state of the Holy Roman Empire, when Austrian Empire emerged as a full sovereign state, later, this state (then known as Cisleithania) would become one of the constituent states of the Austro-Hungarian Monarchy. However, the Austro-Hungarian Monarchy dissolved into smaller sovereign states in 1918, without a clear successor among them (something similar to what happened with Yugoslavia at the end of the 20th century). Later, the country was annexed by Germany in 1938, which in theory would cause it to lose its sovereignty and extinguish its international legal personality. Austria separated from Germany at the end of World War II in 1945. However the Moscow Conference of 1943 declared the German annexation of Austria in 1938 null and void, so the current Austrian state is considered to be the same state in continuity with the one that emerged in 1918.) | 27 July 1955 | World War II Allies ( Allied-occupied Austria): United Kingdom; United States; Soviet Union; France | 1955–present: Republic of Austria, a federation (via Austrian State Treaty); 1945–55: Allied-occupied Austria; 1938–45: Annexed by Nazi Germany; 1934–38: Federal State of Austria (client state of Italy); 1919–34: First Republic of Austria (via Treaty of Saint Germain); 1918–19: Republic of German-Austria; 1867–1918:The Kingdoms and Lands Represented in the Imperial Council, in real union with Lands of the Crown of Saint Stephen, in the Austro-Hungarian Monarchy; 1866–67: Empire of Austria; 1850–1866: Empire of Austria, in union with other 37 sovereign states in the German Confederation; 1848–1850: Empire of Austria, in union with other sovereign states in the German Empire; 1813–1848: Empire of Austria, in union with other 37 sovereign states in the German Confederation; 1806–1813: Empire of Austria; 1804–1806: Empire of Austria, in union with other sovereign states in the Holy Roman Empire; 1453–1804: Archduchy of Austria, in union with other sovereign states in the Holy Roman Empire; 1156–1453: Duchy of Austria, in union with other sovereign states in the Holy Roman Empire; 970–1156: Margraviate of Austria, in union with other sovereign states in the Holy Roman Empire |
| Azerbaijan | Asia/Europe | 30 Aug 1991 | 30 Aug 1991 | Soviet Union | 1991–present: Republic of Azerbaijan |
| Bahamas | The Americas | 10 July 1973 | 10 July 1973 | United Kingdom | 1973–present: Commonwealth of the Bahamas, a monarchy in personal union with the United Kingdom |
| Bahrain | Asia | 16 Dec 1971 | 16 Dec 1971 | United Kingdom | 1971–present: Kingdom of Bahrain |
| Bangladesh | Asia | 16 Dec 1971 | 16 Dec 1971 | Pakistan | 1972–present: People's Republic of Bangladesh; 1971–1972: Provisional Government of the People's Republic of Bangladesh |
| Barbados | The Americas | 30 Nov 1966 | 30 Nov 1966 | United Kingdom | 2021–present: Barbados, a republican state 1966–2021: Barbados, a monarchy in personal union with the United Kingdom |
| Belarus | Europe | 25 Aug 1991 (Note: The medieval Principality of Polotsk became an extinct state after its dissolution in 1307. The first state to use the name Belarus existed from March to December 1918. Modern state of Belarus dates from 1991) | 25 Aug 1991 | Soviet Union | 1991–present: Republic of Belarus |
| Belgium | Europe | 4 Oct 1830 | 4 Feb 1945 | Germany | 1830–present: Kingdom of Belgium, a constitutional monarchy. 5th May 1993–present: a federation since the fourth state reform 1830–4 May 1993: a unitary state divided into provinces |
| Belize | The Americas | 21 Sep 1981 | 21 Sep 1981 | United Kingdom | 1981–present: Belize, a monarchy in personal union with the United Kingdom |
| Benin | Africa | 1 Aug 1960 | 1 Aug 1960 | France | 1990–present: Republic of Benin; 1975–1990: People's Republic of Benin 1960–1975: Republic of Dahomey |
| Bhutan | Asia | 1616 | 17 Dec 1907 | Tibet | 1616–present: Kingdom of Bhutan |
| Bolivia | The Americas | 6 Aug 1825 | 6 Aug 1825 | Spain | 2009–present: Plurinational State of Bolivia; 1839–2009: Republic of Bolivia; 1836–1839: In union with North Peru and South Peru in the Peru–Bolivian Confederation; 1825–1839: Republic of Bolivia |
| Bosnia and Herzegovina | Europe | 3 Mar 1992 | 3 Mar 1992 | Yugoslavia | 1997–present: Bosnia and Herzegovina, a Federation 1992–1997: Republic of Bosnia and Herzegovina |
| Botswana | Africa | 30 Sep 1966 | 30 Sep 1966 | United Kingdom | 1966–present: Republic of Botswana |
| Brazil | The Americas | 7 Sep 1822 | 29 Aug 1825 (Note: Treaty of Rio de Janeiro)) | United Kingdom of Portugal, Brazil and the Algarves | 1985–present: Federative Republic of Brazil (Sixth Brazilian Republic) (a federation) 1964–1985: Federative Republic of Brazil (Military Dictatorship) (Fifth Brazilian Republic) (a federation); 1946–1964: United States of Brazil (Fourth Brazilian Republic) (a federation); 1930–1946: United States of Brazil (Vargas Era) (Second and Third Brazilian Republics) (a federation); 1889–1930: Republic of the United States of Brazil (First Brazilian Republic) (a federation); 1822–1889: Empire of Brazil (a unitary state) |
| Brunei | Asia | 1 Jan 1984 | 1 Jan 1984 | United Kingdom | 1984–present: Nation of Brunei, the Abode of Peace |
| Bulgaria | Europe | 5 Oct 1908 | 5 Oct 1908 | Ottoman Empire | 1990–present: Republic of Bulgaria 1946–1990: People's Republic of Bulgaria; 1908–1946: (Tsardom of Bulgaria (1908–1946)) Tsardom of Bulgaria (reunified with Eastern Rumelia where was a part of the Ottoman Empire) |
| Burkina Faso | Africa | 5 Aug 1960 | 5 Aug 1960 | France | 1984–present: Burkina Faso 1960–1984:Republic of Upper Volta |
| Burundi | Africa | 1 July 1962 | 1 July 1962 | Belgium | 1966–present: Republic of Burundi 1962–1966: Kingdom of Burundi |
| Cambodia | Asia | 9 Nov 1953 | 9 Nov 1953 | France; United Nations Transitional Authority in Cambodia | 1993–present: Kingdom of Cambodia 1992–1993: United Nations Transitional Authority in Cambodia; 1989–1992: State of Cambodia; 1979–1989: People's Republic of Kampuchea; 1975–1979: Democratic Kampuchea; 1970–1975: Khmer Republic; 1953–1970: Kingdom of Cambodia |
| Cameroon | Africa | 1 Jan 1960 | 1 Oct 1961 | France; United Kingdom | 1972–present: Republic of Cameroon, unitary state 1961–1972: Federal Republic of Cameroon; 1960–1961: Republic of Cameroon, unitary state Note: French Cameroons gained independence in 1960; added British Southern Cameroons in 1961. |
| Canada | The Americas | 11 Dec 1931 (Note: Full sovereignty. Adoption of the Statute of Westminster 1931. Canada becomes completely sovereign, having consulates and embassies in other countries) | 11 Dec 1931 | United Kingdom | 1982–present: Canada, a federal state and monarchy in personal union with the United Kingdom, asserts its full independence from the UK by patriating its constitution.; 1931–1982: Canada, a federal state and monarchy in personal union with the United Kingdom (Statute of Westminster in 1931.) |
| Cape Verde | Africa | 5 July 1975 | 5 July 1975 | Portugal | 1975–present: Republic of Cabo Verde |
| Central African Republic | Africa | 13 Aug 1960 | 13 Aug 1960 | France | 1960–present: Central African Republic |
| Chad | Africa | 11 Aug 1960 | 11 Aug 1960 | France | 1960–present: Republic of Chad |
| Chile | The Americas | 12 Feb 1818 (Note: The Kingdom of Chile (Patria Vieja) became an extinct state after its reconquest by Spain. Modern state of Chile dates from 1818) | 12 Feb 1818 | Spain | 1990–present: Republic of Chile (Democracy Restored) 1973–1990: Chilean Military Dictatorship; 1925–1973: Chilean Presidential Republic; 1891–1925: Parliamentary Chile; 1861–1891: Liberal Chile; 1830–1861: Conservative Chile; 1823–1830: Republic of Chile (Organization of the Republic); 1818–1823: Republic of Chile (Patria Nueva, New Fatherland) |
| China | Asia | 17 Feb 1616 (Note: People's Republic of China consider itself the successor state of the Republic of China, the latter considers itself the successor state of the Great Qing. The latter emerged from Great Jin. History of Chinese dynasties (with the rules of modern international law on state succession): The mythological Xia (if it existed) became an extinct state when it was conquered by Shang. Shang also became an extinct state when it was annexed by Zhou. In turn, Zhou became extinct as a state when it was annexed by Qin. Despite the change of dynasties, Qin and Han are considered the same state. Han became an extinct state when it collapsed into Three Kingdoms, with the three states emerging as new states (a situation similar to what occurred with Austria-Hungary and Yugoslavia in the 20th century). Cao Wei, Jin, Liu Song, Southern Qi, Liang, and Chen are dynasties of the same state, which became extinct when conquered by Sui. Northern Wei, Western Wei, Northern Zhou, Sui, Tang, Later Liang, Later Tang, Later Jin, Later Han, and Later Zhou, Song are dynasties of the same state, which became extinct when it was annexed by the Great Yuan. Great Ming emerged as a new state when separated from Great Yuan but became extinct when conquered by Great Qing. Despite the regime change to a republic and later to a socialist republic, the Republic of China and the People's Republic of China are considered to be the same state as the former Qing dynasty.) | 2 Sep 1945 | Japan; Soviet Union; Second United Front | 1949–present: People's Republic of China; 1937–1945: Japanese Invasion; 1928–present: Republic of China (based in Taiwan since 1949); 1916–1928: Republic of China; 1915–1916: Empire of China; 1912–1915: Republic of China; 1636–1912: Great Qing (informally called Chinese Empire) (Note: Qing conquered and annexed Great Ming in 1644, making Great Ming an extinct state.); 1616–1636: Great Jin (New state) The PRC government in Beijing considers itself the successor of the Republic of China (1912–1949) which legally inherited the whole of China from the Qing dynasty. The ROC government in Taipei denies the legitimacy of the PRC and considers itself the sole legitimate government of the whole of China. |
| Colombia | The Americas | 7 Aug 1819 | 7 Aug 1819 | Spain | 1886–present: Republic of Colombia (unitary state) 1863–1886: United States of Colombia (federal state); 1858–1863: Granadine Confederation (confederal state); 1831–1858: Republic of New Granada (unitary state); 1819–1831: Republic of Colombia (Gran Colombia) (federal state) |
| Comoros | Africa | 6 July 1975 | 6 July 1975 | France | 2001–present:Union of the Comores, a Federation 1975–2001: Federal and Islamic Republic of Comoros |
| Congo, Democratic Republic of the | Africa | 30 June 1960 | 30 June 1960 | Belgium | 1997–present: Democratic Republic of the Congo; 1971–1997: Republic of Zaire; 1964–1971: Democratic Republic of the Congo (Kinshasa); 1960–1964: Republic of the Congo (Léopoldville) |
| Congo, Republic of the | Africa | 15 Aug 1960 | 15 Aug 1960 | France | 1992–present: Republic of the Congo; 1969–1992: People's Republic of the Congo; 1960–1969: Republic of the Congo (Brazzaville) |
| Costa Rica | The Americas | 14 Nov 1838 (Note: Costa Rica celebrates its independence on September 15th, as it was on this date that Central America (then an unified country) separated from Spain in 1815. Throughout the 19th and 20th centuries, this federation dissolved, and there have been multiple attempts to restore it. Costa Rica did not participate of the attempts to recreate Central America as a unified country.) | 14 Nov 1838 | Federal Republic of Central America | 1948–present: Republic of Costa Rica (Second) 1848–1948: First Costa Rican Republic; 1838–1847: Free State of Costa Rica |
| Croatia | Europe | 8 Oct 1991 | 8 Oct 1991 | Yugoslavia | 1991–present: Republic of Croatia |
| Cuba | The Americas | 20 May 1902 | 2 Feb 1909 | United States | 1959–present: Republic of Cuba, sovereign communist state 1902–1959: Republic of Cuba, sovereign capitalist state |
| Cyprus | Europe | 16 Aug 1960 | 16 Aug 1960 | United Kingdom | 1960–present: Republic of Cyprus Note: Cyprus has been divided between two ethnicities as one sovereign state: Greek Cyprus and Turkish Cyprus from 1983. |
| Czechia | Europe | 1 Jan 1993 | 1 Jan 1993 | Czechoslovakia | 1993–present: Czech Republic |
| Denmark | Europe | 714 | 5 May 1945 | Germany | 1864–present: Kingdom of Denmark (It consists of metropolitan Denmark (sometimes called "Denmark proper") and the realm's two autonomous (but not sovereign) regions: the Faroe Islands in the North Atlantic and Greenland in North America) 1814–1864: Danish Unitary State – Kingdom of Denmark in personal union with the Duchy of Schleswig, Duchy of Holstein and Duchy of Lauenburg; 1537–1814: Denmark–Norway – Kingdom of Denmark, in real union with the Kingdom of Norway, Duchy of Schleswig, and the Duchy of Holstein; 1523–1537: Denmark–Norway – Kingdom of Denmark, in personal union with the Kingdom of Norway, Duchy of Schleswig, and the Duchy of Holstein; 1397–1523: Kingdom of Denmark, in personal union with the Kingdom of Sweden and the Kingdom of Norway. This union was known as the Kalmar Union; 714–1397: Kingdom of Denmark |
| Djibouti | Africa | 27 June 1977 | 27 June 1977 | France | 1977–present: Republic of Djibouti |
| Dominica | The Americas | 3 Nov 1978 | 3 Nov 1978 | United Kingdom | 1978–present: Commonwealth of Dominica |
| Dominican Republic | The Americas | 27 Feb 1844 (Note: The Republic of Spanish Haiti became an extinct state after its reconquest by Haiti. Modern state of Dominican Republic dates from 1844) | 27 Feb 1844 | Haiti | 1844–present: Dominican Republic |
| Ecuador | The Americas | 13 May 1830 | 13 May 1830 | Gran Colombia | 1830–present: Republic of Ecuador |
| Egypt | Africa/Asia | 28 Feb 1922 (Note: Egypt is one of the oldest nations in the world, its national identity dating back to the First Dynasty of Ancient Egypt. But it is important to stress the difference between state and nation. As a state the nation lost its sovereignty and was conquered by other states several times in History. The current Egyptian state, as an independent sovereign state, dates from 1922) | 28 Feb 1922 | United Kingdom | 1971–present: Arab Republic of Egypt 1958–1971: United Arab Republic (Note: A federal state that emerged from the union of Egypt and Syria; however, Syria left the union in 1961. The only remaining federated state, Egypt, is considered the successor state. This is because the United Arab Republic was a member of the United Nations from February 21, 1958, until September 2, 1971 (ten years after Syria left the union and became a sovereign state again), when its changed its name to the Arab Republic of Egypt.); 1953–1958: Arab Republic of Egypt; 1922–1953: Kingdom of Egypt |
| El Salvador | The Americas | 1 Feb 1841 (Note: El Salvador celebrates its independence on September 15th, as it was on this date that Central America (then an unified country) separated from Spain in 1815. Throughout the 19th and 20th centuries, this federation dissolved, and there have been multiple attempts to restore it. The Federation of Central America was the last failed attempt to unify these countries in 1921–1922. However, a federal government was never created, and its member states continued to be members of the League of Nations as if they were sovereign nations. The seat of power in the last attempt was located in Honduras.) | 1 Feb 1841 | Federal Republic of Central America | 1982–present: Republic of El Salvador 1979–1982: Revolutionary Junta of El Salvador; 1922–1979: Republic of El Salvador; 1921–1922: In union with other Central American states in the Federation of Central America (confederation); 1898–1921: Republic of El Salvador; 1896–1898: In union with other Central American states in the Greater Republic of Central America (confederation); 1841–1898: Republic of El Salvador |
| Equatorial Guinea | Africa | 12 Oct 1968 | 12 Oct 1968 | Spain | 1968–present: Republic of Equatorial Guinea |
| Eritrea | Africa | 24 May 1993 | 24 May 1993 | Ethiopia | 1993–present: State of Eritrea |
| Estonia | Europe | 24 Feb 1918 | 20 Aug 1991 | Soviet Union | 1991–present: Republic of Estonia 1944–1991: Estonian government-in-exile 1940–1991: Estonian Diplomatic Service and Estonian government-in-exile (Occupation by the Soviet Union (1940–1941), Germany (1941–1944) and again by the Soviet Union (1944–1991); 1918–1940: Republic of Estonia |
| Eswatini | Africa | 6 Sep 1968 | 6 Sep 1968 | United Kingdom | 2018–present: Kingdom of Eswatini 1968–2018: Kingdom of Swaziland |
| Ethiopia | Africa | 1137 c. (Note: Approximate date of the establishment of the Zagwe dynasty. Zagwe was one of the kingdoms that emerged from the collapse of the Kingdom of Aksum, that became an extinct or abolished state in 960 AD. It is the direct historical predecessor of the Ethiopian Empire, regardless of the Solomonic dynasty of the ancient Kingdom of Aksum having overthrown the Zagwe dynasty in 1270 and assumed their throne. Dynastic lineages are irrelevant to current international law, mainly because of the fact of the majority of the states in the current world scenario are republics.) | 5 May 1941 | Italy | 1995–present: Federal Democratic Republic of Ethiopia, a federation 1991–1995: Transitional Government of Ethiopia; 1987–1991: People's Democratic Republic of Ethiopia; 1974–1987: Provisional Military Government of Socialist Ethiopia; 1941–1974: Ethiopian Empire; 1936–1941: Occupied by Italy; 1270–1936: Ethiopian Empire c.1137–1270: Zagwe Kingdom |
| Fiji | Oceania | 10 Oct 1970 | 10 Oct 1970 | United Kingdom | 1987–present: Republic of Fiji 1970–1987: Dominion of Fiji, a monarchy in personal union with the United Kingdom |
| Finland | Europe | 6 Dec 1917 | 4 Jan 1918 | Russian Empire | 1919–present: Republic of Finland 1918–1919: Kingdom of Finland; 1918: Finnish Socialist Workers' Republic; 1917: Republic of Finland |
| France | Europe | 843 | 25 Aug 1944 | Germany | 1958—present: French Republic (Fifth; consisted of integral regions (five being overseas regions) and several overseas collectivities) 1946–1958: French Fourth Republic; 1944–1946: Provisional Government of the French Republic; 1940–1944: Free France, a government-in-exile of France, and member of the allies during WWII. 1940–1944: Occupied by Germany in WWII making Vichy France, a Nazi Puppet. 1870–1940: French Third Republic; 1852–1870: Second French Empire; 1848–1852: French Second Republic; 1830–1848: July Monarchy; 1814/5–1830: Bourbon Restoration; 1804–1814/5: First French Empire; 1792–1804: French First Republic; 987–1792: Kingdom of France; 843–987: Kingdom of West Francia (New State)(established by the Treaty of Verdun, after the dissolution of the Carolingian Empire) |
| Gabon | Africa | 17 Aug 1960 | 17 Aug 1960 | France | 1960–present: Gabonese Republic |
| Gambia | Africa | 18 Feb 1965 | 18 Feb 1965 | United Kingdom | 1970–present: Republic of The Gambia 1982–1989: In union with Senegal in the Senegambia Confederation 1965–1970: Gambia, a monarchy in personal union with the United Kingdom |
| Georgia | Asia/Europe | 9 Apr 1991 | 9 Apr 1991 | Soviet Union | 1991–present: Republic of Georgia |
| Germany | Europe | 1 July 1867 (Note: Germans dates their national identity to the establishment of East Francia and to the Holy Roman Empire. However, the Holy Roman Empire dissolved into smaller sovereign states in 1806, without a clear successor among them (something similar to what happened with Yugoslavia at the end of the 20th century). Throughout the 19th century, confederations were formed between these sovereign states until they all united into a federation in 1867. This federal state that emerged from the merger of these smaller states is considered a new state (a process similar to what happened with the United Kingdom at the beginning of the 19th century and with Yemen, Vietnam, and Tanzania throughout the 20th century). The German Democratic Republic (East Germany or GDR), was completely abolished after the German reunification in 1990 and became an extinct state (in fact, it was the most recent case in history). Modern Germany is a reunification of the GDR into the Federal Republic of Germany, not a GDR successor state.) | 15 Mar 1991 | West Berlin; World War II Allies ( Allied-occupied Germany): United Kingdom; United States; Soviet Union; France | 1990–present: Federal Republic of Germany (Become fully sovereign after reunification with the (East Germany) German Democratic Republic on 15 March 1991, after the Treaty on the Final Settlement with Respect to Germany came into effect). 1949–1990: Federal Republic of Germany ( West Berlin was an exclave of West Germany). 1945–1949: Germany occupied between the (Allied-occupied Germany) Allies (USA, UK, France and Soviet Union) (The occupation lasted from 1945 until the ratification of Bonn–Paris conventions in 1955). 1933–1945: Nazi Germany; 1918–1933: (Weimar Republic) Weimar Germany (a federation); 1878–1918: German Empire (Prussia Unified in a federal monarchy with all state kingdoms of Germany, excluding Austria). 1867–1878: North German Confederation, new sovereign state and federal union of 22 German-speaking states (previously sovereign states). |
| Greece | Europe | 25 Mar 1822 | 8 May 1945 | Bulgaria; Germany; Italy | 1974–present: Third Hellenic Republic 1967–1974:: Greek Dictatorship; 1944–1973: Kingdom of Greece; 1941–1944: Hellenic State, a government-in-exile during the axis occupation, and member of the allies during WWII. 1935–1941: Kingdom of Greece; 1924–1935: Second Hellenic Republic; 1832–1924: Kingdom of Greece; 1822–1832: After the War of Independence Greece declared independent as the First Hellenic Republic (New State) |
| Grenada | The Americas | 7 Feb 1974 | 7 Feb 1974 | United Kingdom | 1974–present: Grenada, a monarchy in personal union with the United Kingdom |
| Ghana | Africa | 6 May 1957 | 6 May 1957 | United Kingdom | 1960–present: Republic of Ghana 1957–1960: Dominion of Ghana, a monarchy in personal union with the United Kingdom |
| Guatemala | The Americas | 17 Apr 1839 | 17 Apr 1839 | Federal Republic of Central America | 1922–present: Republic of Guatemala 1921–1922: Federated state of the Federal Republic of Central America; 1839–1921: Republic of Guatemala |
| Guinea | Africa | 2 Oct 1958 | 2 Oct 1958 | France | 1958–present: Republic of Guinea |
| Guinea-Bissau | Africa | 24 Sep 1973 | 10 Sep 1974 | Portugal | 1973–present: Republic of Guinea-Bissau |
| Guyana | The Americas | 26 May 1966 | 26 May 1966 | United Kingdom | 1970–present: Co-operative Republic of Guyana; 1966–1970: Guyana, a monarchy in personal union with the United Kingdom |
| Haiti | The Americas | 1 Jan 1804 | 1 Aug 1934 | United States | 1915–1934: United States occupation of Haiti 1859–present: Republic of Haiti; 1849–1859: Second Empire of Haiti; 1820–1849: Republic of Haiti; 1811–1820: Kingdom of Haiti; 1806–1811: State of Haiti; 1804–1806: First Empire of Haiti |
| Honduras | The Americas | 26 Oct 1838 (Note: Honduras celebrates its independence on September 15th, as it was on this date that Central America (then an unified country) separated from Spain in 1815. Throughout the 19th and 20th centuries, this federation dissolved, and there have been multiple attempts to restore it. The Federation of Central America was the last failed attempt to unify these countries in 1921–1922. However, a federal government was never created, and its member states continued to be members of the League of Nations as if they were sovereign nations.) | May 1924 | United States | 1922–present: Republic of Honduras 1921–1922: In union with other Central American states in the Federation of Central America (confederation); 1898–1921: Republic of Honduras (United States has been occupied on the Honduran Land in 1903, 1907, 1911, 1912, 1919, 1924). 1896–1898: In union with other Central American states in the Greater Republic of Central America (confederation); 1838 – 1896: Republic of Honduras |
| Hungary | Europe | 895 (Note: The Grand Principality of Hungary or Duchy of Hungary (Hungarian: Magyar Nagyfejedelemség: "Hungarian Grand Principality", Byzantine Greek: Τουρκία (Tourkia)) was the earliest documented Hungarian state in the Carpathian Basin, established around 895, following the 9th century Magyar invasion of the Carpathian Basin. The Hungarians took possession of the Carpathian Basin in a pre-planned manner, with a long move-in between 862–895.). | 23 Oct 1989 | Austria-Hungary; Soviet Union | 1989–present: Hungary 1949–1989: Hungarian People's Republic; 1946–1949: Second Hungarian Republic; 1000–1946: Kingdom of Hungary his family (the Árpád dynasty) led the monarchy for 300 years. By the 12th century, the kingdom had become a European power. 895–1000: Grand Principality of Hungary |
| Iceland | Europe | 1 Dec 1918 | 1 Dec 1918 | Denmark; United Kingdom; Canada; United States | 1945–present: Republic of Iceland 1944–1945: Republic of Iceland (occupied by the United States); 1918–1944: Kingdom of Iceland, with a personal union with Denmark (Occupied by the United Kingdom and Canada in 1940 and 1941 and by the United States in 1941–1944) |
| India | Asia | 15 Aug 1947 | 15 Aug 1947 | United Kingdom | 1950–present: Republic of India, a federation 1947–1950: Union of India, a federation and monarchy in a personal union with the United Kingdom |
| Indonesia | Asia/Oceania | 17 Aug 1945 | 27 Dec 1949 | Netherlands | 1956–present: Republic of Indonesia 1950–1956: Republic of Indonesia, a republic in real union with the Netherlands in the Netherlands-Indonesia Union (confederation); 1949–1950: Republic of the United States of Indonesia, a republic in real union with the Netherlands in the Netherlands-Indonesia Union (confederation); 1945–1949: Republic of Indonesia, in a National Revolution against Netherlands |
| Iran | Asia | 1501 (Note: Iran is one of the oldest nations in the world, its national identity dating back to the Median Empire and the Achaemenid Empire. But it is important to stress the difference between state and nation. As a state the nation lost its sovereignty and was conquered by other states several times in History. The current Iranian state, as an independent state in a contiguous way, dates from 1501) | 2 Mar 1946 | United Kingdom; Soviet Union | 1980–present: Islamic Republic of Iran 1979–1980: Under an Interim Government; 1925–1979: Imperial State of Iran (Anglo-Soviet occupation 1941–1946)(In 1935 the Iranian emperor Reza Shah Pahlavi officially requested that foreigners begin using the endonym "Iran" instead of Persia); 1796–1925: Guarded Domains of Persia (Qajar dynasty); 1736–1796: Guarded Domains of Persia (Afsharid dynasty); 1501–1736: Guarded Domains of Persia (Safavid dynasty) |
| Iraq | Asia | 3 Oct 1932 (Note: Iraq is one of the oldest nations in the world, its national identity dating back to the Sumerian Civilization and other ancient Mesopotamian civilizations. But it is important to stress the difference between state and nation. As a state the nation lost its sovereignty and was conquered by other states several times in History. The current Iraqi state, as an independent state in a contiguous way, dates from 1932) | 1 May 2003 | United States; United Kingdom; Australia; Poland | 2003–present: Republic of Iraq, a federation 2003: American Invasion; 1968–2003: Iraqi Republic; 1958–1968: Iraqi Republic; 1958: Arab Federation of Iraq and Jordan; 1932–1958: Kingdom of Iraq |
| Ireland | Europe | 11 Dec 1931 (Note: Adoption of the Statute of Westminster 1931. Internationally recognized independence, by nations that aren't members of the Commonwealth of Nations) | 11 Dec 1931 | United Kingdom | 1948–present: Ireland (additionally described as the Republic of Ireland) (Republic of Ireland Act 1948: Ireland becomes a republic, ending the monarchy). 1937–1948: Ireland (Constitution of Ireland (1937): name change to "Ireland" (Irish: Éire), the country still was a monarchy in a personal union with Great Britain); 1931–1937: Irish Free State, monarchic state in a personal union with the United Kingdom |
| Israel | Asia | 14 May 1948 | 14 May 1948 | United Kingdom | 1948–present: State of Israel |
| Italy | Europe | 1003 (Note: Although the national identity of Italy dates back to the Ancient Rome, the de jure predecessor date back to 1003) | 2 May 1945 | Allies of World War II: United Kingdom; United States; France; Canada; South Africa; Poland; Brazil; Greece | 1946–present: Italian Republic 1945–1946: Kingdom of Italy; 1943–1945: Italian Social Republic, a Nazi Puppet. 1861–1943: Kingdom of Italy (Kingdom of Sardinia expands its territory and annexes the existing states on the Italian peninsula; these states become legally extinct under international law.); 1847–1861: Kingdom of Sardinia; 1814–1847: Duchy of Savoy, restored by the Congress of Vienna; 1792–1814: Duchy of Savoy annexed by Revolutionary France; 1416–1792: Duchy of Savoy, in union with other sovereign states in the Holy Roman Empire; 1003–1416: County of Savoy, in union with other sovereign states in the Holy Roman Empire |
| Ivory Coast | Africa | 7 Aug 1960 | 7 Aug 1960 | France | 1960–present Republic of Côte d'Ivoire |
| Jamaica | The Americas | 6 Aug 1962 | 6 Aug 1962 | United Kingdom | 1962–present: Jamaica, a monarchy in personal union with the United Kingdom |
| Japan | Asia | 539 (Note: Beginning of the reign of the first Japanese emperor proven to have existed historically) | 28 Apr 1952 | World War II Allies ( Allied-occupied Japan) United States (de facto) | 1952–present: Japan (after the Treaty of San Francisco ended postwar occupation). 1945–1952: Allied-Occupation of Japan with the United States and the United Kingdom in the post-war period. 1868–1945: Empire of Japan; 1603–1868: Tokugawa shogunate 1568–1603: Japanese Azuchi–Momoyama; 1336–1568: Ashikaga shogunate 1333–1336: Kenmu Restoration; 1185–1333: Kamakura shogunate 794–1185: Heian era 710–794: Nara era 538–710: Asuka era c. 300–578: Kofun era (Era when all Japanese states merged into one in c. 400 AD). |
| Jordan | Asia | 25 May 1946 | 2 Aug 1958 | United Kingdom | 1958–present: Hashemite Kingdom of Jordan Feb–Aug 1958: In union with Iraq in the Arab Federation (confederation); 1946–1958: Hashemite Kingdom of Jordan |
| Kazakhstan | Asia/Europe | 16 Dec 1991 | 16 Dec 1991 | Soviet Union | 1991–present: Republic of Kazakhstan |
| Kenya | Africa | 12 Dec 1963 | 12 Dec 1963 | United Kingdom | 1964–present: Republic of Kenya; 1963–1964: Kenya, a monarchy in personal union with the United Kingdom |
| Kiribati | Oceania | 12 July 1979 | 12 July 1979 | United Kingdom | 1979–present: Republic of Kiribati |
| North Korea | Asia | 9 Sep 1948 | 9 Sep 1948 | Soviet Union | 1948–present: (North Korea) Democratic People's Republic of Korea (New State) |
| South Korea | Asia | 15 Aug 1948 | 15 Aug 1948 | United States | 1987–present: (South Korea) Republic of Korea (Sixth) 1981–1987: Fifth Republic of Korea; 1972–1981: Fourth Republic of Korea; 1963–1972: Third Republic of Korea; 1961–1963: Supreme Council for National Reconstruction; 1960–1961: Second Republic of Korea; 1948–1960: First Republic of Korea (New State) |
| Kosovo | Europe | 17 Feb 2008 | 17 Feb 2008 | Serbia; United Nations Administered Kosovo | 2008–present: Republic of Kosovo |
| Kuwait | Asia | 19 June 1961 | 28 Feb 1991 | Iraq | 1991–present: State of Kuwait 1990–1991: Kuwait Governorate, governorate of Iraq; 1990: Republic of Kuwait; 1961–1990: State of Kuwait |
| Kyrgyzstan | Asia | 31 Aug 1991 | 31 Aug 1991 | Soviet Union | 1991–present: Kyrgyz Republic (the name "Republic of Kyrgyzstan" was adopted in 1990, changed to current in 1993) |
| Laos | Asia | 22 Oct 1953 | 22 Oct 1953 | France | 1975–present: Lao People's Democratic Republic 1953–1975: Kingdom of Laos |
| Latvia | Europe | 18 Nov 1918 | 4 May 1990 | Soviet Union | 1991–present: Republic of Latvia 1940–1991: Latvian diplomatic service in exile (Occupation by Germany (1940–1944) and later by the Soviet Union (1944–1991)); 1918–1940: Republic of Latvia |
| Lebanon | Asia | 22 Nov 1943 | 31 Dec 1946 | France | 1943–present: Lebanese Republic |
| Lesotho | Africa | 4 Oct 1966 | 4 Oct 1966 | United Kingdom | 1966–present: Kingdom of Lesotho |
| Liberia | Africa | 26 July 1847 | 26 July 1847 | American Colonization Society | 1847–present: Republic of Liberia (1980–1984: People's Redemption Council) |
| Libya | Africa | 1 Mar 1949 | 24 Dec 1951 | France; United Kingdom | 2011–present: State of Libya (Sometimes refer to as Libya) 1977–2011: Great Socialist People's Libyan Arab Jamahiriya (before 1986 without the word "Great" in the full name of the country); 1969–1977: Libyan Arab Republic; 1963–1969: Kingdom of Libya; 1951–1963: United Kingdom of Libya; 1949–1951: Cyrenaica Emirate |
| Liechtenstein | Europe | 23 Jan 1719 | 23 Jan 1719 | None | 1866–present: Principality of Liechtenstein 1850–1866: Principality of Liechtenstein, in union with other 37 sovereign states in the German Confederation; 1848–1850: Principality of Liechtenstein, in union with other sovereign states in the German Empire; 1813–1848: Principality of Liechtenstein, in union with other 37 sovereign states in the German Confederation; 1806–1813: Principality of Liechtenstein, in union with other 37 sovereign states in the Confederation of the Rhine; 1719–1806: Principality of Liechtenstein, in union with other sovereign states in the Holy Roman Empire |
| Lithuania | Europe | 16 Feb 1918 | 11 Mar 1990 | Soviet Union | 1991–present: Republic of Lithuania 1940–1991: Lithuanian Diplomatic Service (Occupation by Germany (1940–1944) and later by the Soviet Union (1944–1991); 1918–1940: Republic of Lithuania; 1918: Kingdom of Lithuania |
| Luxembourg | Europe | 15 Mar 1815 | 22 Feb 1945 | Germany | 1890–present: Grand Duchy of Luxembourg, independent state with its own dynasty 1866–1890: Grand Duchy of Luxembourg, independent state in personal union with Netherlands; 1815–1866: Grand Duchy of Luxembourg, independent from France in 1815 and in union with other 37 sovereign states in the German Confederation, but also in personal union with Netherlands |
| Madagascar | Africa | 26 June 1960 | 26 June 1960 | France | 2014–present: Republic of Madagascar (Fourth Republic) 2009–2014: High Transitional Authority; 1992–2009: Republic of Madagascar (Third Republic); 1975–1992: Democratic Republic of Madagascar; 1960–1975: Malagasy Republic |
| Malawi | Africa | 6 July 1964 | 6 July 1964 | United Kingdom | 1964–present: Republic of Malawi |
| Malaysia | Asia | 31 Aug 1957 | 31 Aug 1957 | United Kingdom | 1963–present: Malaysia, a federation 1957–1963: Federation of Malaya Note: The Federation of Malaya gained independence in 1957; in 1963 it added territories of Sabah, Sarawak and Singapore, and changed its name to Malaysia (a federal state). Singapore became independent in 1965. |
| Maldives | Asia | 26 July 1965 | 26 July 1965 | United Kingdom | 1965–present: Republic of Maldives |
| Mali | Africa | 20 Aug 1960 | 20 Aug 1960 | Mali Federation | 1960–present: Republic of Mali Note: The Mali Federation (along with Senegal and French Sudan) gained independence from France on 20 June 1960. Senegal left the federation on 20 Aug 1960. Sudan then chose to keep the name Mali. |
| Malta | Europe | 21 Sep 1964 | 21 Sep 1964 | United Kingdom | 1974–present: Republic of Malta; 1964–1974: State of Malta, a monarchy in personal union with the United Kingdom |
| Marshall Islands | Oceania | 21 Oct 1986 | 21 Oct 1986 | United States | 1986–present: Republic of the Marshall Islands |
| Mauritania | Africa | 28 Nov 1960 | 28 Nov 1960 | France | 1960–present: Islamic Republic of Mauritania |
| Mauritius | Africa | 12 Mar 1968 | 12 Mar 1968 | United Kingdom | 1992–present: Republic of Mauritius 1968–1992: Mauritius, a monarchy in personal union with the United Kingdom |
| Mexico | The Americas | 16 Sep 1810 | 10 Apr 1864 | Spain | 1867–present: United Mexican States (a federation) 1864–1867: Second Mexican Empire (a unitary state); 1846–1863: Second Federal Republic of Mexico (a federation); 1835–1846: Centralist Republic of Mexico (a federation); 1823–1824: Provisional Government of Mexico; 1821–1823: First Mexican Empire (unitary state) |
| Micronesia, Federated States of | Oceania | 3 Nov 1986 | 3 Nov 1986 | United States | 1986–present: Federated States of Micronesia, a federation |
| Moldova | Europe | 27 Aug 1991 | 27 Aug 1991 | Soviet Union | 1991–present: Moldova |
| Monaco | Europe | 2 Feb 1861 (Note: The first Franco-Monégasque Treaty) | 3 Sep 1944 | Germany | 1911–present: Principality of Monaco |
| Mongolia | Asia | 13 Mar 1921 (Note: Mongolia celebrates its independence day on December 29th, as on this day in 1911, the country declared its independence from China. However, in 1915, Mongolia again lost its sovereignty, becoming an autonomous state within the Republic of China. In 1921, in the context of the Mongolian Revolution of 1921, the country regained its independence; however, China questioned this sovereignty until 1945.) | 13 Mar 1921 | Republic of China | 1990–present: Mongolia 1945–1992: Mongolian People's Republic; 1924–1945: Mongolian People's Republic; 1921–1924: Bogd Khanate of Mongolia |
| Montenegro | Europe | 4 Feb 2003 (Note: Montenegrins date their national identity to the founding of Prince-Bishopric of Montenegro in 1516, with some ultranationalists claiming their nation's origin to be in the 10th century medieval principality of Duklja. However, the Montenegrin state became an extinct state at the time of the Podgorica Assembly, which led to the annexation and extinction of the Kingdom of Montenegro by the Kingdom of Serbia. The current Montenegrin state regained independence in 2006 after leaving the State Union of Serbia and Montenegro.) | 21 May 2006 (independence referendum); 3 June 2006 | Yugoslavia | 2006–present: Montenegro 2003–2006: In union with Serbia in the State Union of Serbia and Montenegro (confederation) |
| Morocco | Africa | 1631 | 7 Apr 1956 | France; Spain | 1955–present: Kingdom of Morocco 1912–1956:French protectorate of Morocco; 1912–1956:Spanish protectorate of Morocco; 1666–1912: Alaouite Sultanate of Morocco; 1631–1966: Alaouite Emirate of Morocco |
| Mozambique | Africa | 25 June 1975 | 25 June 1975 | Portugal | 1975–present: Republic of Mozambique |
| Myanmar | Asia | 4 Jan 1948 | 4 Jan 1948 | United Kingdom | 2008–present: Republic of the Union of Myanmar; 1988–2008: Union of Myanmar; 1962–1988: Socialist Republic of the Union of Burma; 1948–1962: Union of Burma |
| Namibia | Africa | 21 Mar 1990 | 21 Mar 1990 | South Africa | 1990–present: Republic of Namibia |
| Nauru | Oceania | 31 Jan 1968 | 31 Jan 1968 | Australia; New Zealand; United Kingdom; Trust Territory of Nauru | 1968–present: Republic of Nauru |
| Nepal | Asia | 1559 | 29 Sep 1768 | None | 2008–present: Federal Democratic Republic of Nepal 1768–2008: Kingdom of Nepal; 1559–1768: Gorkha Kingdom |
| Netherlands | Europe | 20 Nov 1813 (Note: The Dutch trace their national identity back to the establishment of the Republic of the Seven Provinces of the Netherlands in 1581 (recognized as an independent nation from the Holy Roman Empire in 1648). However, the last successor state to this country, the Kingdom of Holland, became an extinct state due to annexation by Napoleon Bonaparte's First French Empire. Thus, under modern international law, the Sovereign Principality of the United Netherlands is a new state.) | 5 May 1945 | Germany | 1945–present: Kingdom of the Netherlands (reestablished in 1945. Aruba, Curaçao, the Netherlands, and Sint Maarten are the constituent countries of the Kingdom) 1940–1945: Occupied by Nazi Germany establishing as Dutch government-in-exile, a member of the allies during WWII. 1839–1940: Kingdom of the Netherlands; 1815–1839: United Kingdom of the Netherlands; 1813–1815: Sovereign Principality of the United Netherlands (New State) |
| New Zealand | Oceania | 25 Nov 1947 (Note: Adoption of the Statute of Westminster 1931) | 25 Nov 1947 | United Kingdom | 1947–present: Realm of New Zealand, a monarchy in a personal union with the United Kingdom. (New Zealand (a sovereign state) has one Antarctic territorial claim (the Ross Dependency), one dependent territory (Tokelau), and two associated states (the Cook Islands and Niue)) |
| Nicaragua | The Americas | 13 Nov 1838 (Note: Nicaragua celebrates its independence on September 15th, as it was on this date that Central America (then an unified country) separated from Spain in 1815. Throughout the 19th and 20th centuries, this federation dissolved, and there have been multiple attempts to restore it. The last failed attempt to unify these countries occurred in 1921–1922. However, Nicaragua did not join the other countries in this attempt; the last time it joined a federation was between 1896 and 1898, in the Greater Republic of Central America.) | 2 Jan 1933 | United States of America | 1898–present: Republic of Nicaragua 1896–1898: In union with other Central American states in the Greater Republic of Central America (confederation); 1838–1896: Republic of Nicaragua |
| Niger | Africa | 7 Aug 1960 | 7 Aug 1960 | France | 1960–present: Republic of the Niger |
| Nigeria | Africa | 1 Oct 1960 | 1 Oct 1960 | United Kingdom | 1963–present: Federal Republic of Nigeria, a federation 1960–1963: Nigeria, a federation and monarchy in personal union with the United Kingdom |
| North Macedonia | Europe | 8 Sep 1991 | 8 Sep 1991 | Yugoslavia | 2019–present: Republic of North Macedonia 1991–2019: (North Macedonia) / (North Macedonia) Republic of Macedonia |
| Norway | Europe | 872 | 8 May 1945 | Germany | 1940–present: Kingdom of Norway 1940–1945: Occupied by Germany (Reichskommissariat). 1905–1940: Kingdom of Norway (Haakon VII elected Norwegian king in a referendum in 1905). 1814–1905: United Kingdoms of Sweden and Norway. A personal union between the Kingdom of Sweden and the Kingdom of Norway. 1537–1814: Denmark–Norway – Kingdom of Norway, in real union with the Kingdom of Denmark, Duchy of Schleswig, and the Duchy of Holstein. 1523–1537: Denmark–Norway – Kingdom of Norway, in personal union with the Kingdom of Denmark, Duchy of Schleswig, and the Duchy of Holstein. 1397–1523: Kingdom of Norway, in personal union with the Kingdom of Sweden and the Kingdom of Denmark. This union was known as the Kalmar Union; 872–1397: Kingdom of Norway (According to tradition, Harald Fairhair unified all the small kingdoms into one in 872 after the Battle of Hafrsfjord in Stavanger, thus becoming the first king of a united Norway. In 1163, Norway adopted its current Law of Succession) |
| Oman | Asia | 1154 (Note: Independence from Seljuk Empire) | 11 Mar 1976 | Dhofar War: United Kingdom; Pahlavi Iran | 1970–present Oman 1856–1970: Sultanate of Muscat and Oman; 1696–1856: Omani Empire; 1154–1624: Imamate of Oman |
| Pakistan | Asia | 14 Aug 1947 | 14 Aug 1947 | United Kingdom | 1956–present: Islamic Republic of Pakistan, a federation 1947–1956: Pakistan, a federation and monarchy in personal union with the United Kingdom |
| Palau | Oceania | 1 Oct 1994 | 1 Oct 1994 | United States | 1994–present: Republic of Palau |
| Palestine | Asia | 15 Nov 1988; Sovereignty disputed by Israel (Note: On 15 November 1988, the Palestine Liberation Organization also proclaimed its independence of the State of Palestine and attained its autonomy as the Palestinian National Authority in 1994 in the West Bank and Gaza Strip, the territories that are occupied by Israel since 1967. Parts of West Bank are controlled by Israel, except for the Area A of the Palestinian National Authority. The Gaza Strip has been occupied by Hamas since the 2007 war after Israeli disengagement from Gaza in 2005. The West Bank was occupied by Jordan from 1948 to 1967, and the Gaza Strip was occupied by Egypt from 1957 to 1967.) | 15 Nov 1988 | Israel | 1988–present: State of Palestine |
| Panama | The Americas | 3 Nov 1903 | 31 Jan 1990 | United States | 1990–present:Republic of Panama; 1989–1990: American Invasion; 1903–1989: Republic of Panama |
| Papua New Guinea | Oceania | 16 Sep 1975 | 16 Sep 1975 | Australia | 1975–present: Independent State of Papua New Guinea |
| Paraguay | The Americas | 14 May 1811 (de facto); Nov 25, 1845 (formal declaration of Independence) | 22 June 1876 | Empire of Brazil Argentina; Uruguay | 1876–present: Republic of Paraguay Occupied 1870–1876 by Brazil, in Triple Alliance with Argentina and Uruguay. (Note: Paraguayan independence was assured only after the War of the Triple Alliance, when Brazil resisted Argentine offers to divide and annex the country); 1813–1870: Republic of Paraguay (Note: Paraguay refused to join the United Provinces of the Río de la Plata and the Argentine Confederation [future Argentina ], which considered Paraguay to be a break-away province. On 12 October 1813 the Paraguayan Republic was proclaimed. Paraguay only made a formal declaration of independence in 1845. It was only recognized by Argentina as an independent country on 17 July 1852. However, this recognition was rejected by the Congress of Argentina and the actual recognition of independence came only in 1856)); 1811–1813: Province of Paraguay (de facto independent of Spain, but still de jure part of the Spanish Empire) |
| Peru | The Americas | 28 July 1821 | 25 Aug 1839 | North Peru; South Peru; Río de la Plata; Conservative Chile | 1839–present: Republic of Peru 1836–1839: Divided in North Peru and South Peru, in union with Bolivia in the Peru–Bolivian Confederation; 1822–1836: Republic of Peru; 1821–1822: Regime of Free Departments |
| Philippines | Asia | 4 July 1946 (Note: The First Philippine Republic was an unrecognized state and became an extinct state after being terminated by the United States and was replaced by the Insular Government of the Philippine Islands. The Commonwealth of the Philippines was an unincorporated territory and commonwealth (dependency) of the United States that existed from 1935 to 1946. The Second Philippine Republic was a puppet state of the Japanese Empire became an extinct state after the American reconquest of the archipelago. Modern state of Philippines dates from 1946. However, Filipinos celebrate their independence date on June 12 (the date of establishment of the First Philippine Republic) in order to avoid celebrating their national date on the same day that their former colonizers (the USA) celebrate their national date (July 4).) | 4 July 1946 (Note: Independence recognized via the Treaty of Manila (1946).) | United States | 1946–present: Republic of the Philippines |
| Poland | Europe | 11 Nov 1918 (Note: As a new state, not as a nation) | 30 Mar 1945 | Germany; Soviet Union | 1989–present: Republic of Poland 1947–1989: Polish People's Republic; 1945–1947: Provisional Government of National Unity; 1939–1990: Government of the Republic of Poland in exile 1939–1945: Occupied by Nazi Germany and the Soviet Union during WWII making the Polish Underground State as an emergency state, and later in 1944 Poland was proposed to make a Government. 1918–1939: Republic of Poland |
| Portugal | Europe | 25 July 1139 | 30 Aug 1808 (Note: Convention of Cintra ended French occupation of Lisbon) | France | 1975–present: Portuguese Republic (Third) 1974–1975: National Salvation Junta; 1933–1974: Second Portuguese Republic (Estado Novo/New State); 1926–1933: Second Portuguese Republic (National Dictatorship); 1910–1926: First Portuguese Republic; 1834–1910: Kingdom of Portugal and the Algarves; 1825–1834: Kingdom of Portugal and the Algarves; 1815–1825: United Kingdom of Portugal, Brazil and the Algarves (Brazil declared its independence from Portugal in 1822, but Portugal only recognized it in 1825); 1777–1834: Kingdom of Portugal and the Algarves (Napoleonic era); 1640–1777: Kingdom of Portugal and the Algarves; 1580–1640: Kingdom of Portugal and the Algarves (and its colonial empire) in a personal union with the states of the Hispanic Monarchy, this union was known as the Iberian Union; 1415–1580: Kingdom of Portugal and the Algarves; 1139–1415: Kingdom of Portugal (Independent after the Battle of Ourique, Although it was not until 4 years later in 1143, when independence was recognized). |
| Qatar | Asia | 3 Sep 1971 | 3 Sep 1971 | United Kingdom | 1971–present: State of Qatar |
| Romania | Europe | 10 May 1877 | 10 May 1877 | Ottoman Empire | 1989–present: Romania; 1965–1989: Socialist Republic of Romania; 1947–1965:Romanian People's Republic; 1881–1947: Kingdom of Romania; 1878–1881:Principality of Romania |
| Russia | Asia/Europe | 1480 | 26 Dec 1991 (de facto); 12 Dec 1993 (de jure) (Note: Russia dates its national identity back to the Kievan Rus, medieval state that was extinguished when it was conquered by the Mongols of the Golden Horde. A new Russian sovereign state arose and existed continuously and without loss of sovereignty from 1480 until 1922, when of its own accord it ceased to be a sovereign state and became a subnational unit of the Soviet Union. With the dissolution of the Soviet Union, the nation again had a sovereign state, with the current Russian sovereign state dating back to 1991. The Russian Federation is regarded as the successor state to the former Soviet Union, inheriting its seat as a UN member state, after a letter by president Boris Yeltsin was received by the secretary-general Javier Pérez de Cuéllar.) | Soviet Union | 1993–present: Russian Federation (a federation) 1991–1993: Russian Federation (a federation)(with the 1978 constitution. The United Nations recognizes Russia as the successor state of the USSR.); 1922–1991: Union of Soviet Socialist Republics (a federation); 1918–1922: Russian Soviet Federative Socialist Republic (a federation); 19 January 1918: Russian Democratic Federative Republic (a federation); 1917–1918: Russian Soviet Federative Socialist Republic (a federation); 14 Sep – 7 Nov 1917: Russian Republic (a federation); 1721–1917: Russian Empire (a unitary state); 1547–1721: Tsardom of Russia; 1480–1547: Grand Duchy of Moscow, sovereign and independent state |
| Rwanda | Africa | 1 July 1962 | 1 July 1962 | Belgium | 1962–present: Republic of Rwanda |
| Saint Kitts and Nevis | The Americas | 19 Sep 1983 | 19 Sep 1983 | United Kingdom | 1983–present: Federation of Saint Kitts and Nevis, a federation and monarchy in personal union with the United Kingdom |
| Saint Lucia | The Americas | 22 Feb 1979 | 22 Feb 1979 | United Kingdom | 1979–present: Saint Lucia, a monarchy in personal union with the United Kingdom |
| Saint Vincent and the Grenadines | The Americas | 27 Oct 1979 | 27 Oct 1979 | United Kingdom | 1979–present: Saint Vincent and the Grenadines, a monarchy in personal union with the United Kingdom |
| Samoa | Oceania | 1 Jan 1962 | 1 Jan 1962 | New Zealand | 1962–present: Independent State of Samoa |
| San Marino | Europe | 1291 | 21 Sep 1944 | World War II Allies | 1944: Brief occupation by Germany, then Allies during Battle of San Marino 1739: Brief occupation by the Papal States; 1503: Brief occupation by Rimini; 1243: The people of San Marino established the positions of Captains Regent (Capitani Reggenti) as a joint heads of state Before 1243: Part of the Roman Empire; 301: Traditionally said to have been founded by Saint Marinus |
| São Tomé and Príncipe | Africa | 12 July 1975 | 12 July 1975 | Portugal | 1975–1991: Democratic Republic of São Tomé and Príncipe |
| Saudi Arabia | Asia | 23 Sep 1932 | 23 Sep 1932 | Sultanate of Nejd; Kingdom of Hejaz; Kingdom of Hejaz and Nejd (real union) | 1932–present: Kingdom of Saudi Arabia (Note: Saudi Arabia dates its national identity from the establishment of the Emirate of Diriya (First Saudi State), however this state later became extinct, as did the Emirate of Nejd (the Second Saudi State). The Third Saudi State came into being in 1903 when it separated from the Emirate of Jabal Shammar. Through wars of conquest it conquered other states and made a real union with Hejaz. In 1932, Hejaz and Nejd were merged, creating a new state, according to the International Law) |
| Senegal | Africa | 20 Aug 1960 | 20 Aug 1960 | Mali Federation | 1960–present: Republic of Senegal 1982–1989: In union with The Gambia in the Senegambia Confederation Note: The Mali Federation (along with Senegal and French Sudan) gained independence from France on 20 June 1960. Senegal left the federation on 20 Aug 1960. Sudan then chose to keep the name Mali. |
| Serbia | Europe | 4 Feb 2003 (Note: As a new state, not as a nation. The current Serbian state emerged in 2003, after the dissolution of Yugoslavia and confederalization of the country. The Arbitration Commission of the Peace Conference on Yugoslavia ruled that the Federal Republic of Yugoslavia (later Serbia and Montenegro) could not legally be considered a continuation of the former Socialist Federal Republic of Yugoslavia, but it was a new state. Other Serbian states existed before this date, but ceased to exist due to the conquest by other states or by joining other states (of their own volition) in a federation. It is important not to confuse the concept of state with that of the nation, as a nation the Serbian people have existed since the Middle Ages, and just like other ethnic groups (such as the Greeks, Jews, Egyptians, etc.) it went through periods of its history in which it was a Stateless nation) | 3 June 2006 | Yugoslavia | 2006–present: Republic of Serbia 2003–2006: Republic of Serbia, in union with Montenegro in the State Union of Serbia and Montenegro (New state, confederation, and successor polity of the Federal Republic of Yugoslavia) |
| Seychelles | Africa | 29 June 1976 | 29 June 1976 | United Kingdom | 1976–present: Republic of Seychelles |
| Sierra Leone | Africa | 27 Apr 1961 | 27 Apr 1961 | United Kingdom | 1971–present: Republic of Sierra Leone 1961–1971: Dominion of Sierra Leone, a monarchy in personal union with the United Kingdom |
| Singapore | Asia | 9 Aug 1965 | 9 Aug 1965 | Malaysia | 1965–present: Republic of Singapore |
| Slovakia | Europe | 1 Jan 1993 | 1 Jan 1993 | Czechoslovakia | 1993–present: Slovak Republic |
| Slovenia | Europe | 25 June 1991 | 25 June 1991 | Yugoslavia | 1991–present: Republic of Slovenia |
| Solomon Islands | Oceania | 7 July 1978 | 7 July 1978 | United Kingdom | 1978–present: Solomon Islands, a monarchy in personal union with the United Kingdom |
| Somalia | Africa | 1 July 1960 | 1 July 1960 | United Kingdom; Italy | 2012–present: Federal Republic of Somalia, a federation 2004–2012: Transitional Federal Government of Somalia, transition from unitary state to federation 2000–2004: Transitional National Government of Somalia, a unitary state 1997–2000: Somali Republic; 1991–1997: Interim Government of the Somali Republic, a unitary state 1969–1991: Somali Democratic Republic, a unitary state 1960–1969: Somali Republic, a unitary state |
| South Africa | Africa | 11 Dec 1931 (Note: Adoption of the Statute of Westminster 1931) | 11 Dec 1931 | United Kingdom | 1961–present: Republic of South Africa (Democratization in 1994) 1931–1961: Union of South Africa, monarchy in personal union with the United Kingdom |
| South Sudan | Africa | 9 July 2011 | 9 July 2011 | Sudan | 2011–present: Republic of South Sudan, a federation |
| Spain | Europe | 1479 (Note: Spain is a unitary state that emerged from the political union by incorporating union of different states throughout history. In International Law, Spain emerged as a new state in 1479, with the dynastic union between Castille and Aragon. The two kingdoms began to act externally as a single political entity because they shared the same sovereign and, above all, the same foreign policy. The outside world (non-Spanish foreign leaders) saw a single diplomatic actor: "the Hispanic Monarchy" or "Spain." Internally, however, Castile and Aragon remained separate until 1716, with their own institutions, laws, and administrations. International Law is not interested in internal administrative configurations, but in the presence of a single sovereign subject in external relations. When Philip V of Spain legally unified the kingdoms between 1707 and 1716 in the Nueva Planta decrees, abolishing fueros and local courts, there was no change to the international system: the sovereign was the same, the territory was the same, the treaties remained valid, and the powers recognized absolute continuity. Thus, for International Law, a new State was not born; what occurred was merely an internal reorganization.) | 11 Dec 1813 | France | 1982–present: Kingdom of Spain (with democracy) 1975–1982: Kingdom of Spain (restored thrice; transition to democracy); 1939–1977: Spanish Republic (government in exile); 1947: Referendum of re-establishing the Spanish Kingdom; 1936–1975: Francoist Spain; 1931–1939: Second Spanish Republic; 1874–1931: Kingdom of Spain (restored again); 1873–1874: First Spanish Republic; 1810–1873: Kingdom of Spain (restored); 1803–1810: Kingdom of Napoleonic Spain, a French occupation. (Note: During Napoleon's invasion of Spain, Spain was occupied by France. In fear of invasion, the King of Portugal went to Rio de Janeiro, in the Portuguese colony of Brazil); 1716–1810: Kingdom of Spain; 1640–1716: Hispanic Monarchy; 1580–1640: Iberian Union (The states of the Hispanic Monarchy in personal union with the Kingdom of Portugal); 1516–1580: Hispanic Monarchy (after the Reconquista, two Catholic monarchies (Castile and Aragon) and among other territories such as Navarre were merged by Charles I of Spain). 1479–1516: Dynastic unification of Spain, internally divided in Crown of Castile and the Crown of Aragon |
| Sri Lanka | Asia | 4 Feb 1948 | 4 Feb 1948 | United Kingdom | 1972–present: Democratic Socialist Republic of Sri Lanka; 1948–1972: Dominion of Ceylon, a monarchy in personal union with the United Kingdom |
| Sudan | Africa | 1 Jan 1956 (Note: Sudan dates its national identity to the Kingdom of Kerma, Kingdom of Kush and other ancient kingdoms that existed in its territory, i.e Nubia (mentioned in ancient Egyptian texts). However, as an independent sovereign state, the current Sudanese state dates back to 1956.) | 1 Jan 1956 | United Kingdom; Egypt | 2019–present: Republic of the Sudan, a federation 1985–2019: Republic of Sudan, a federation 1969–1985:Democratic Republic of Sudan, a federation 1956–1969: Republic of Sudan, a federation |
| Suriname | The Americas | 25 Nov 1975 | 25 Nov 1975 | Kingdom of the Netherlands | 1975–present: Republic of Suriname |
| Sweden | Europe | 970 c. | 6 June 1523 | Kalmar Union | 1905–present: Kingdom of Sweden 1814–1905: United Kingdom of Sweden and Norway. A personal union between the Kingdom of Sweden and the Kingdom of Norway. 1523–1814: Kingdom of Sweden; 1397–1523: Kingdom of Sweden, in personal union with the Kingdom of Norway and the Kingdom of Denmark. This union was known as the Kalmar Union; 970–1397: Kingdom of Sweden |
| Switzerland | Europe | 24 Oct 1648 | 6 Apr 1814 | France | 1848–present: (Switzerland) Swiss Confederation (second) 1814–1848: Swiss Confederation (in Restoration and Regeneration) with the Congress of Vienna of 1815. 1803–1814: Napoleonic Swiss Confederation, a French puppet state 1798–1803: Helvetic Republic, a French occupation 1648–1798: (Old Swiss Confederacy) : Swiss Confederation(Independence fully recognized by the Peace of Westphalia; 1291–1648: (Old Swiss Confederacy) : Swiss Confederation, confederation of states within the Holy Roman Empire (itself a confederation) |
| Syria | Asia | 28 Sep 1961 (Note: Syria was one of the founding members of the United Nations, having joined the organization on October 24, 1945. By uniting with Egypt to form the United Arab Republic into a political union, the Second Syrian Republic ceased to exist as a sovereign state and became an extinct state, with Syria becoming a subnational unit of the United Arab Republic. The UAR continued as a single UN member state. On October 13, 1961, following the dissolution of the UAR, Syria resumed its status as an sovereign state and regained its position as a separate member of the United Nations. However, Syrians celebrate 17 April as their independence day, as it was on 17 April 1946 that the nation ceased to be a colony of France.) | 8 Dec 2024 | United Arab Republic; Ba'athist Syria | 2024–present: Syrian Arab Republic (post–Assad regime), under the Syrian transitional government 1963–2024: Syrian Arab Republic, under the Assad regime (1971–2024); 1961–1963: Syrian Arab Republic |
| Tajikistan | Asia | 9 Sep 1991 | 9 Sep 1991 | Soviet Union | 1991–present: Republic of Tajikistan |
| Tanzania | Africa | 26 Apr 1964 | 26 Apr 1964 | Tanganyika; Zanzibar | 1964–present: United Republic of Tanzania 1964: United Republic of Tanganyika and Zanzibar (New State) (Note: The United Nations considers Tanzania a new state, resulting from the union of Tanganyika and Zanzibar.) |
| Thailand | Asia | 4 Mar 1351 | 9 Sep 1945 | Japan | 1939–present: Kingdom of Thailand (The country changed its name from Siam to Thailand) 1932–1939: Kingdom of Siam; 1885–1932: Kingdom of Siam; 1782–1885: Rattanakosin Kingdom; 1767–1782: Thonburi Kingdom; 1351–1767: Ayutthaya Kingdom |
| Timor-Leste | Asia | 20 May 2002 | 20 May 2002 | Indonesia; United Nations Transitional Administration in East Timor | 2002–present: Democratic Republic of Timor-Leste |
| Togo | Africa | 27 Apr 1960 | 27 Apr 1960 | France | 1960–present: Togolese Republic |
| Tonga | Oceania | 4 June 1970 | 4 June 1970 | United Kingdom | 1970–present: Kingdom of Tonga |
| Trinidad and Tobago | The Americas | 31 Aug 1962 | 31 Aug 1962 | United Kingdom | 1976–present: Republic of Trinidad and Tobago; 1962–1976: Trinidad and Tobago, a monarchy in personal union with the United Kingdom |
| Tunisia | Africa | 20 Mar 1956 (Note: The national identity of Tunisia dates back to the Ancient Carthage. But it is important to stress the difference between state and nation. As a state the nation lost its sovereignty and was conquered by other states several times in History. The current Tunisian state, as an independent state in a contiguous way, dates from 1956) | 20 Mar 1956 | France | 1957–present: Republic of Tunisia; 1956–1957: Kingdom of Tunisia |
| Turkey | Asia/Europe | 1299 (Note: The Republic of Turkey is the successor state of the Ottoman Empire. The country's national date is the Republic Day (Cumhuriyet Bayramı), which commemorates the change of government regime from a monarchy to a republic.) | 1 May 1924 | Allies of World War I: Greece; Italy; United Kingdom; France; Armenia | 1923–present: Republic of Turkey; 1920–1923: Ankara Government, provisional government founded in Ankara in opposition to the Allied occupation. 1920–1922: Ottoman Empire, occupied by Greece, Italy, France, United Kingdom and Armenia following World War I (Treaty of Sèvres) (Note: Republican Turks, led by General Mustafa Kemal Atatürk initiate the Turkish War of Independence to expel foreign occupation troops and at the same time wage a civil war against Turkish monarchists, seen as collaborationists by the republicans)); 1299–1920: Ottoman Empire |
| Turkmenistan | Asia | 27 Oct 1991 | 27 Oct 1991 | Soviet Union | 1991–present: Turkmenistan |
| Tuvalu | Oceania | 1 Oct 1978 | 1 Oct 1978 | United Kingdom | 1978–present: Tuvalu, a monarchy in personal union with the United Kingdom |
| Uganda | Africa | 9 Oct 1962 | 9 Oct 1962 | United Kingdom | 1963–present: Republic of Uganda; 1962–1963: Uganda, a monarchy in personal union with the United Kingdom |
| Ukraine | Europe | 24 Aug 1991 (Note: Ukraine dates its national identity back to the Kievan Rus, however this state became an extinct state when it was conquered by the Mongols of the Golden Horde. Another state with historical importance for Ukrainians in their national identity is the medieval Kingdom of Galicia–Volhynia, which however also became an extinct state. In the 17th century the Ukrainian nation established another Ukrainian state, the Cossack Hetmanate, however this state became extinct upon being conquered by the Russian Empire. Between 1917 and 1919, two new Ukrainian states was established, being unified in 1919 but again lost its sovereignty by becoming a subnational unit of the Soviet Union. The current Ukrainian sovereign state dates from 1991, emerging after the dissolution of the Soviet Union.) | 24 Aug 1991 | Soviet Union | 1991–present: Ukraine |
| United Arab Emirates | Asia | 2 Dec 1971 | 2 Dec 1971 | United Kingdom | 1971–present: United Arab Emirates |
| United Kingdom | Europe | 1 Jan 1801 (Note: The United Kingdom is a unitary state that emerged from the political union of different states throughout history. Northern Ireland has been part of this political union since 1922, when the rest of Ireland declared its independence from the United Kingdom. Ireland had united with Great Britain in 1800 to form the United Kingdom of Great Britain and Ireland, creating a new state according to the International Law. The Kingdom of Great Britain itself emerged from the political union between the Kingdom of England (which had already conquered and annexed the Principality of Wales centuries before) and the Kingdom of Scotland, also creating a new state in the process according to international law.) | 1 Jan 1801 | Kingdom of Great Britain; Kingdom of Ireland | 1922–present: United Kingdom of Great Britain and Northern Ireland 1801–1922: United Kingdom of Great Britain and Ireland (New State) |
| United States | The Americas | 4 July 1776 | 19 Oct 1781 | Great Britain | 1776–present: United States of America, a federation |
| Uruguay | The Americas | 27 Aug 1828 | 27 Aug 1828 | Empire of Brazil | 1830–present: Oriental Republic of Uruguay 1828–1830: Oriental State of Uruguay |
| Uzbekistan | Asia | 1 Sep 1991 | 1 Sep 1991 | Soviet Union | 1991–present: Republic of Uzbekistan |
| Vanuatu | Oceania | 30 July 1980 | 30 July 1980 | United Kingdom; France | 1980–present: Republic of Vanuatu |
| Vatican City | Europe | 11 Feb 1929 (Note: The independent state of Vatican City came into existence in 1929 via the Lateran Treaty between the Holy See and the Kingdom of Italy, which spoke of it as a new creation, not as a vestige of the much larger Papal States (756–1870), which had previously encompassed much of Central Italy.) | 11 Feb 1929 | Italy | 1929–present: Vatican City State |
| Venezuela | The Americas | 13 Jan 1830 | 13 Jan 1830 | Gran Colombia | 1999–present Bolivarian Republic of Venezuela (a federal state, comprising twenty-three states, a capital district and the Federal Dependencies which consist in several islands in the Caribbean sea) 1953–1999: Republic of Venezuela (a federal state); 1864–1953: United States of Venezuela (a federal state); 1830–1864: State of Venezuela (a unitary state) |
| Vietnam | Asia | 2 July 1976 | 2 July 1976 | North Vietnam; South Vietnam | 1976–present: Socialist Republic of Vietnam (New State) (Note: The United Nations recognizes the Socialist Republic of Vietnam as a new state created by unification.) |
| Yemen | Asia | 22 May 1990 | 22 May 1990 | North Yemen; South Yemen | 1990–present: Republic of Yemen (New State) (Note: Yemen is a new state created by the merger of two predecessor states. Legally, both states dissolved to create a single state. When North and South Yemen signed the Unification Agreement (1990), each extinguished its independent international legal personality. This is the central characteristic of a merger union.) |
| Zambia | Africa | 24 Oct 1964 | 24 Oct 1964 | United Kingdom | 1964–present: Republic of Zambia |
| Zimbabwe | Africa | 11 Nov 1965 | 18 Apr 1980 | United Kingdom | 1980–present: Republic of Zimbabwe 1979–1980: Zimbabwe Rhodesia; 1970–1979: Republic of Rhodesia; 1965–1970: Rhodesia, a monarchy in personal union with the United Kingdom |

== List of countries by current form of government ==
=== Africa ===
| Country | Date of current form of government | Birth of current form of government |
|---|---|---|
| Algeria | 8 December 1996 | Constitution of Algeria |
| Angola | 21 January 2010 | Constitution of Angola |
| Benin | 2 December 1990 | Constitution of Benin |
| Botswana | 30 September 1966 | Constitution of Botswana |
| Burkina Faso | 11 June 1991 | Constitution of Burkina Faso |
| Burundi | 9 March 1992 | Constitution of Burundi |
| Cape Verde | 1992 | Constitution of Cape Verde |
| Cameroon | 18 January 1996 | Constitution of Cameroon |
| Central African Republic | 27 March 2016 | Constitution of the Central African Republic |
| Chad | 31 March 1996 | Constitution of Chad |
| Comoros | 23 December 2001 | Constitution of the Comoros |
| Democratic Republic of Congo | 18 February 2006 | Constitution of the Democratic Republic of the Congo |
| Republic of Congo | 2001 | Constitution of the Republic of the Congo |
| Djibouti | 15 September 1992 | Constitution of Djibouti |
| Egypt | 18 January 2014 | Constitution of Egypt |
| Equatorial Guinea | 17 November 1991 | Constitution of Equatorial Guinea |
| Eritrea | 23 May 1997 | Constitution of Eritrea |
| Eswatini | 2005 | Constitution of Eswatini |
| Ethiopia | 21 August 1995 | 1995 Constitution of Ethiopia |
| Gabon | 2001 | Constitution of Gabon |
| Gambia | 16 January 1997 | Constitution of The Gambia |
| Ghana | 28 April 1992 | Constitution of Ghana |
| Guinea | 7 May 2010 | Constitution of Guinea |
| Guinea-Bissau | 6 May 1984 | Constitution of Guinea-Bissau |
| Ivory Coast | 8 November 2016 | Constitution of Ivory Coast |
| Kenya | 27 August 2010 | Constitution of Kenya |
| Lesotho | 1993 | Constitution of Lesotho |
| Liberia | 6 January 1986 | Constitution of Liberia |
| Libya | 3 August 2011 | Libyan interim Constitutional Declaration; Note: In 2014 the House of Representatives takes power. (Note: Since the beginning of the Second Libyan Civil War in 2014, various areas of Libya are under the control of competing groups. These include domestic groups such as New General National Congress and local Tuareg groups, and foreign groups such as ISIL.) |
| Madagascar | 14 November 2010 | Constitution of Madagascar |
| Malawi | 16 May 1994 | Constitution of Malawi |
| Mali | 12 January 1992 | Constitution of Mali |
| Mauritania | 12 July 1991 | Constitution of Mauritania |
| Mauritius | 12 March 1968 | Constitution of Mauritius |
| Morocco | 14 December 1962 | Constitution of Morocco |
| Mozambique | 21 December 2004 | Constitution of Mozambique |
| Namibia | 9 February 1990 | Constitution of Namibia |
| Niger | 25 November 2010 | Constitution of Niger |
| Nigeria | 29 May 1999 | Constitution of Nigeria |
| Rwanda | 26 May 2003 | Constitution of Rwanda |
| São Tomé and Príncipe | 5 November 1975 | Constitution of São Tomé and Príncipe |
| Senegal | 1 January 2001 | Constitution of Senegal |
| Seychelles | 1993 | Constitution of Seychelles |
| Sierra Leone | 1996 | Constitution of Sierra Leone |
| Somalia | 1 August 2012 | Constitution of Somalia (Note: With the ongoing Somali Civil War, significant areas remain outside federal control.) |
| South Africa | 4 February 1997 | Constitution of South Africa |
| South Sudan | 9 July 2011 | Constitution of South Sudan |
| Sudan | 4 August 2019 | Constitution of Sudan |
| Tanzania | 25 April 1977 | Constitution of Tanzania (Note: Amendment to Constitution of Tanzania in 1997 ended status as one-party state) |
| Togo | 6 May 2024 | Constitution of Togo |
| Tunisia | 25 July 2022 | Constitution of Tunisia |
| Uganda | 8 October 1995 | Constitution of Uganda |
| Zambia | 2016 | Constitution of Zambia |
| Zimbabwe | 9 May 2013 | Constitution of Zimbabwe |

=== Americas ===
| Country | Date of current form of government | Birth of current form of government |
|---|---|---|
| Antigua and Barbuda | 31 October 1981 | Constitution of Antigua and Barbuda |
| Argentina | 1 May 1853 | Constitution of Argentina |
| Bahamas | 1973 | Law of the Bahamas |
| Barbados | 30 November 1966 | Constitution of Barbados |
| Belize | 21 September 1981 | Constitution of Belize |
| Bolivia | 25 January 2009 | Constitution of Bolivia |
| Brazil | 5 October 1988 | Constitution of Brazil |
| Canada | 1867–1982 | Constitution of Canada (uncodified constitution) |
| Chile | 11 September 1980 | Constitution of Chile |
| Colombia | 4 July 1991 | Constitution of Colombia |
| Costa Rica | 7 November 1949 | Constitution of Costa Rica |
| Cuba | 10 April 1949 | Cuban Revolution |
| Dominica | 3 November 1978 | Constitution of Dominica |
| Dominican Republic | 26 January 2010 | Constitution of the Dominican Republic (Note: In the Dominican Republic, every constitutional amendment is considered a new constitution. The most recent amendment was the 2010 constitution.) |
| Ecuador | 28 September 2008 | Constitution of Ecuador |
| El Salvador | 16 December 1983 | Constitution of El Salvador |
| Grenada | 7 February 1974 | Constitution of Grenada |
| Guatemala | 31 May 1985 | Constitution of Guatemala |
| Guyana | 6 October 1980 | Constitution of Guyana |
| Haiti | 20 June 2012 | Constitution of 1987 (superseded) |
| Honduras | 11 January 1982 | Constitution of Honduras |
| Jamaica | 1 January 1962 | Constitution of Jamaica |
| Mexico | 5 February 1917 | Constitution of Mexico |
| Nicaragua | 9 January 1987 | Constitution of Nicaragua |
| Panama | 11 October 1972 | Constitution of Panama |
| Paraguay | 20 June 1992 | Constitution of Paraguay |
| Peru | 31 December 1993 | Constitution of Peru |
| Saint Kitts and Nevis | 23 June 1983 | Constitution of Saint Kitts and Nevis |
| Saint Lucia | 22 February 1979 | Constitution of Saint Lucia |
| Saint Vincent and the Grenadines | 27 October 1979 | Constitution of Saint Vincent and the Grenadines |
| Suriname | 30 September 1987 | Constitution of Suriname |
| Trinidad and Tobago | 1976 | Constitution of the Republic of Trinidad and Tobago |
| United States | 4 March 1789 | United States Constitution |
| Uruguay | 18 July 1830 | Constitution of Uruguay |
| Venezuela | 3 January 2026 | No Constitution The 2026 United States intervention in Venezuela placed Delcy Rodriguez as an interim president. |

=== Asia ===
| Country | Date of current form of government | Birth of current form of government |
|---|---|---|
| Afghanistan | 15 August 2021 | No Constitution; Fall of Kabul reestablished the Islamic Emirate of Afghanistan. |
| Armenia | 5 July 1995 | Constitution of Armenia (Note: 2015 Armenian constitutional referendum created a parliamentary republic) |
| Bahrain | 14 February 2002 | Constitution of Bahrain |
| Bangladesh | 4 November 1972 | Constitution of Bangladesh |
| Bhutan | 18 July 2008 | Constitution of Bhutan |
| Brunei | 29 September 1959 | Constitution of Brunei |
| Cambodia | 21 September 1993 | Constitution of Cambodia |
| People's Republic of China | 4 December 1982 | Constitution of the People's Republic of China |
| Republic of China (Taiwan) (Note: Republic of China: For some clarification and more detail, see Chinese Civil War, One China with respective interpretations, Two Chinas, Chinese legitimacy question, Timeline of diplomatic relations of the Republic of China, International recognition of Taiwan and Political status of Taiwan.) | 25 December 1947 | Constitution of the Republic of China (Note: The Additional Articles of the Constitution of the Republic of China was passed on 1 May 1991 and only applies to the Taiwan Area only.) |
| Cyprus | 16 August 1960 | Constitution of Cyprus |
| India | 26 November 1949 | Constitution of India |
| Iran | 3 December 1979 | Constitution of Iran |
| Iraq | 15 October 2005 | Constitution of Iraq |
| Israel | 1958 | Basic Laws of Israel (uncodified constitution) (Note: Most recent law: 2018) |
| Japan | 3 May 1947 | Constitution of Japan |
| Jordan | 11 January 1952 | Constitution of Jordan |
| North Korea | 25 December 1972 | Constitution of North Korea |
| South Korea | 17 July 1948 | Constitution of South Korea |
| Kuwait | 11 November 1962 | Constitution of Kuwait |
| Kyrgyzstan | 11 April 2021 | Constitution of Kyrgyzstan |
| Laos | 14 August 1991 | Constitution of Laos |
| Lebanon | 23 May 1926 | Constitution of Lebanon |
| Malaysia | 27 August 1957 | Constitution of Malaysia |
| Maldives | 7 August 2008 | Constitution of the Maldives |
| Mongolia | 13 January 1992 | Constitution of Mongolia |
| Myanmar | 29 May 2008 | Constitution of Myanmar |
| Nepal | 20 September 2015 | Constitution of Nepal |
| Oman | 6 November 1996 | Basic Statute of Oman |
| Pakistan | 14 August 1973 | Constitution of Pakistan |
| Palestine (Note: See Palestinian National Authority for some clarification and more detail, see History of the State of Palestine.) | 28 May 1964 | Palestinian National Covenant |
| Philippines (Note: Philippines: For some clarification and more detail, see Timeline of Philippine Sovereignty and Sovereignty of the Philippines.) | 2 February 1987 | Constitution of the Philippines |
| Qatar | 9 April 2004 | Constitution of Qatar |
| Saudi Arabia | 1 March 1992 | Basic Law of Saudi Arabia |
| Singapore | 9 August 1965 | Constitution of Singapore |
| Sri Lanka | 7 September 1978 | Constitution of Sri Lanka |
| Syria | 29 March 2025 | Constitutional Declaration of Syria |
| Tajikistan | 6 November 1994 | Constitution of Tajikistan |
| Thailand | 6 April 2017 | Constitution of Thailand |
| Timor-Leste | 20 May 2002 | Constitution of East Timor |
| Turkmenistan | 18 May 1992 | Constitution of Turkmenistan |
| United Arab Emirates | 2 December 1971 | Constitution of the United Arab Emirates |
| Uzbekistan | 8 December 1992 | Constitution of Uzbekistan |
| Vietnam | 1 January 2014 | Constitution of Vietnam |
| Yemen | 16 May 1990 | Constitution of Yemen |

=== Europe ===
| Country | Date of current form of government | Birth of current form of government |
|---|---|---|
| Albania | 28 November 1998 | Constitution of Albania |
| Andorra | 2 February 1993 | Constitution of Andorra |
| Austria | 1 October 1920 | Constitution of Austria |
| Belarus | 15 March 1994 | Constitution of Belarus |
| Belgium | 7 February 1831 | Constitution of Belgium |
| Bosnia and Herzegovina | 14 December 1995 (Note: According to the Badinter Arbitration Committee, the Socialist Federal Republic of Yugoslavia was dissolved into five states. This is the result when the Serb-dominated Federal Republic of Yugoslavia (FRY) was formed on 27 April 1992 as a rump state, consisting only of the former Socialist Republics of Serbia and Montenegro. Its government claimed continuity to the former country, however, the international community refused to recognize it as such. The stance of the international community was that Yugoslavia had dissolved into its separate states. The Federal Republic of Yugoslavia was prevented by a UN resolution on 22 September 1992 from continuing to occupy the United Nations seat as successor state to SFRY. This question was important for claims on SFRY's international assets, including embassies in many countries. Only in 1996 had the FRY abandoned its claim to continuity from the SFRY. The FRY was dominated by Slobodan Milošević and his political allies. This was reaffirmed in the Succession Agreement signed in June 2001.) | Constitution of Bosnia and Herzegovina |
| Bulgaria | 12 July 1991 | Constitution of Bulgaria |
| Croatia | 22 December 1990 | Constitution of Croatia |
| Czechia | 16 December 1992 | Constitution of Czechia |
| Denmark | 25 May 1849 | Constitution of Denmark |
| Estonia | 28 June 1992 | Constitution of Estonia (Note: The date of formation of the current states of Estonia, Latvia and Lithuania is subject to an international dispute. Estonia, Latvia and Lithuania all maintain that they were illegally occupied by the Soviet Union, and that the current states are direct continuations of the pre-WWII states, which continued to exist through governments-in-exile. Russia maintains that the current three states are legally distinct entities newly created after the dissolution of the Soviet Union. All three states were admitted the UN as independent nations, not successor states of the USSR. For more information, see State continuity of the Baltic states.) (Note: The annexation of the Baltic states in 1940 is considered an illegal occupation by the current governments of Estonia, Latvia and Lithuania and by a number of Western countries, including the United States and the European Union, who assert that the states were independent countries occupied by the Soviet Union. The three corresponding Soviet republics were officially sovereign entities in a federation, according to Article 76 of the Constitution of the Soviet Union. However, the Soviet Union was heavily centralized and was de facto a single federal state and the three states consider the corresponding Soviet republics to have been illegitimate entities.) |
| Finland | 1 March 2000 | Constitution of Finland |
| France | 4 October 1958 | Constitution of France |
| Germany | 23 May 1949 | Basic Law of Germany |
| Greece | 11 June 1975 | Constitution of Greece |
| Hungary | 18 April 2011 | Constitution of Hungary |
| Iceland | 17 June 1944 | Constitution of Iceland |
| Ireland | 29 December 1937 | Constitution of Ireland |
| Italy | 22 December 1947 | Constitution of Italy |
| Kosovo | 15 June 2008 | Constitution of Kosovo |
| Latvia | 7 November 1922 | Constitution of Latvia |
| Liechtenstein | 5 October 1921 | Constitution of Liechtenstein |
| Lithuania | 25 October 1992 | Constitution of Lithuania |
| Luxembourg | 17 October 1868 | Constitution of Luxembourg |
| Malta | 21 September 1964 | Constitution of Malta |
| Moldova | 29 August 1994 | Constitution of Moldova |
| Monaco | 17 December 1962 | Constitution of Monaco |
| Montenegro | 19 October 2007 | Constitution of Montenegro |
| Netherlands | 24 August 1815 | Constitution of the Netherlands |
| North Macedonia | 17 November 1991 | Constitution of North Macedonia |
| Norway | 17 May 1814 | Constitution of Norway |
| Poland | 2 April 1997 | Constitution of Poland |
| Portugal | 25 April 1976 | Constitution of Portugal |
| Romania | 21 November 1991 | Constitution of Romania |
| San Marino | 1600 | Constitution of San Marino |
| Serbia | 8 November 2008 | Constitution of Serbia |
| Slovakia | 1 October 1992 | Constitution of Slovakia (Note: Adopted before the Dissolution of Czechoslovakia) |
| Slovenia | 23 December 1991 | Constitution of Slovenia |
| Spain | 6 December 1978 | Constitution of Spain |
| Sweden | 1 January 1974 | Instrument of Government |
| Switzerland | 18 July 1999 | Swiss Federal Constitution |
| Ukraine | 28 June 1996 | Constitution of Ukraine |
| United Kingdom | 1 January 1801 | Acts of Union 1800 |
| Vatican City | 26 November 2000 | Fundamental Law of Vatican City State |

=== Oceania ===
| Country | Date of current form of government | Birth of current form of government |
|---|---|---|
| Australia | 1 January 1901 | Constitution of Australia |
| Fiji | 6 September 2013 | Constitution of Fiji |
| Kiribati | 1979 | Constitution of Kiribati |
| Marshall Islands | 1 May 1979 | Constitution of the Marshall Islands |
| Federated States of Micronesia | 10 May 1979 | Constitution of the Federated States of Micronesia |
| Nauru | 31 January 1968 | Constitution of Nauru |
| New Zealand | 6 February 1840; 1979–2016 | Treaty of Waitangi where the British Crown established a right to govern from indigenous Māori tribes Constitution of New Zealand |
| Palau | 1 January 1981 | Constitution of Palau |
| Papua New Guinea | 16 September 1975 | Constitution of Papua New Guinea |
| Samoa | 28 October 1960 | Constitution of Samoa |
| Solomon Islands | 31 May 1978 | Constitution of Solomon Islands |
| Tonga | 4 November 1875 | Constitution of Tonga |
| Tuvalu | 1986 | Constitution of Tuvalu |
| Vanuatu | 30 July 1980 | Constitution of Vanuatu |

=== Transcontinental states ===
| Country | Date of current form of government | Birth of current form of government |
|---|---|---|
| Azerbaijan | 12 November 1995 | Constitution of Azerbaijan |
| Egypt | 18 January 2014 | Constitution of Egypt |
| Georgia | 24 August 1995 | Constitution of Georgia (country) |
| Indonesia | 18 August 1945 | Constitution of Indonesia |
| Panama | 11 October 1972 | Constitution of Panama |
| Russia | 12 December 1993 | Constitution of Russia |
| Turkey | 7 November 1982 | Constitution of Turkey |

== See also ==
- Declaration of independence
- List of former European colonies
- List of former national capitals
- List of former sovereign states
- List of national constitutions
- List of national independence days
- List of sovereign states
- List of wars of independence
- Lists of separatist movements
- Political history of the world
- Successor state
- Timeline of geopolitical changes
- Timeline of national independence
