= Flag of Central America =

Historical flags of Central America

Central America
- Use: National flag and ensign
- Proportion: 2:3
- Adopted: 21 August 1823 (modified in 1824)
- Relinquished: 1839
- Design: A blue and white horizontal triband with the coat of arms of Central America in the center

Central America was a unified nation at several points throughout its history, and while united, the country has used several national flags. The design of the Central American flag, a blue and white horizontal triband, was inspired by the flag of Argentina.

== Flags ==
Flag	Adopted	Relinquished	Entity
	1609	1701	Captaincy General of Guatemala (Spain)
	1701	1760	Captaincy General of Guatemala (Spain)
	1760	1785	Captaincy General of Guatemala (Spain)
	1785	15 September 1821	Captaincy General of Guatemala (Spain)
	5 January 1822	1 July 1823	Captaincy General of Guatemala (Mexico)
	21 August 1823	1824	United Provinces of Central America
	1824	1839	Federal Republic of Central America
	1842	1845	Confederation of Central America
	1 November 1898	29 November 1898	Greater Republic of Central America
	9 September 1921	29 January 1922	Federation of Central America
	13 December 1991	present	Central American Integration System

== See also ==
- Flags of successor nations
  - Flag of Costa Rica
  - Flag of El Salvador
  - Flag of Guatemala
  - Flag of Honduras
  - Flag of Nicaragua
