= Federation of Central America (1921–1922) =

Former country in Central America

Federation of Central America Federación de Centro América
- 1921–1922
- Flag Coat of arms
- Motto: Dios, Unión, Libertad "God, Union, Liberty"
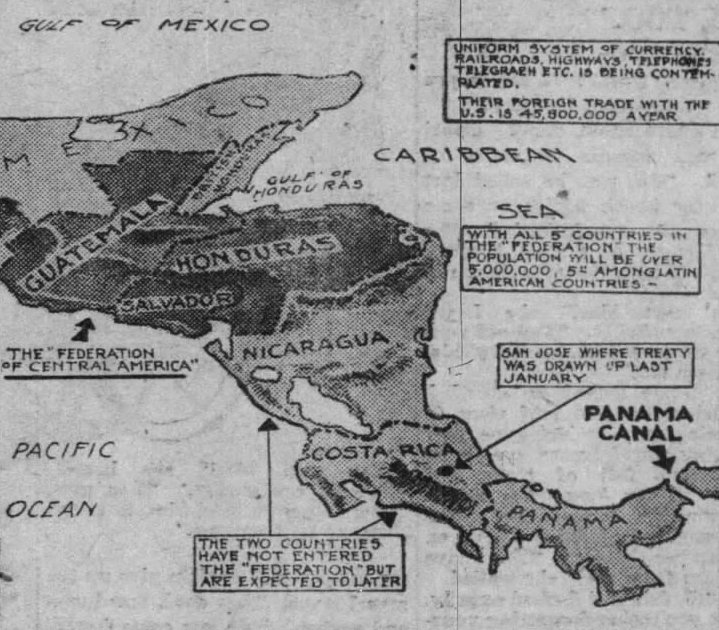
- A map of the federation (shaded) published in Daily News on 9 April 1921
- Location: Central America
- Capital: Tegucigalpa
- Common languages: Spanish
- Demonym: Central American
- Government: Federal republic
- Legislature: National Constituent Assembly
  - Upper house: Senate
  - Lower house: Chamber of Deputies
- History
  - Pact of Union: 19 January 1921
  - Established: 6 April 1921
  - Constitution: 9 September 1921
  - Guatemalan coup: 5 December 1921
  - Disestablished: 29 January 1922

Area
- 1921: 262,010 km^{2} (101,160 sq mi)

Population
  - 1921: 4,100,000
Preceded by
El Salvador
Guatemala
Honduras
Succeeded by
El Salvador
Guatemala
Honduras
- Today part of: El Salvador, Guatemala, Honduras

The Federation of Central America (Spanish: Federación de Centro América) was a short-lived federal republic that existed in Central America between 1921 and 1922. The federation consisted of the Central American nations of El Salvador, Guatemala, and Honduras.

The former members of the Federal Republic of Central America (1823–1841) wanted to restore a Central American union to counter United States influence in the region and to commemorate the centenary of Central American independence in 1921. Delegations from Costa Rica, El Salvador, Guatemala, Honduras, and Nicaragua drafted the Pact of Union of Central America in January 1921, and the pact was signed by the former four countries; Nicaragua refused to sign as it conflicted with the Bryan–Chamorro Treaty it had with the United States. By 6 April 1921, El Salvador, Guatemala, and Honduras had ratified the pact, officially establishing the Federation of Central America. Costa Rica rejected the pact in June 1921 and never joined the federation.

The National Constituent Assembly convened in Tegucigalpa, Honduras in July 1921 and proclaimed a constitution on 9 September 1921. The federation's members ratified the constitution that same day and held federal legislative and executive elections in October 1921. In December 1921, General José María Orellana overthrew the Guatemalan government and the federation expelled Guatemala the following month. The Federation of Central America dissolved on 29 January 1922.

== Background ==
Beginning in the mid 16th, Central America was a colonial possession of the Spanish Empire. The region was organized as the Captaincy General of Guatemala and was administered as a part of New Spain. During the Bourbon Reforms in 1785 and 1786, several intendancies were established within the captaincy general to better administer the region and expel corrupt officials. The following intendancies were established: Ciudad Real (Chiapas), Comayagua (Honduras), León (Nicaragua), and San Salvador (El Salvador).

On 15 September 1821, Central America declared its independence from the Spanish Empire, and in 1823, it established the Federal Republic of Central America. The federal republic consisted of five members: Costa Rica, El Salvador, Guatemala, Honduras, and Nicaragua. The federal republic collapsed between 1838 and 1841 when all its members declared their independence following a civil war between liberals and conservatives.

After the collapse of the Federal Republic of Central America, former members attempted to restore it on several occasions during the 19th century, but all attempts eventually failed. These included the Confederation of Central America (1842), the Republic of Central America (1852–1854), the Republic of Central America (1889), and the Greater Republic of Central America (1895–1898).

== History ==
=== Establishment ===
With the centenary of Central American independence approaching on 15 September 1921, the governments of the Federal Republic of Central America's former members wanted to restore a Central American union. The pro-union governments of Costa Rica and Guatemala pushed for reunification to occur in time for the centenary. The governments of Costa Rica and El Salvador were further motivated to form a union to oppose the influence the United States held in Nicaragua through the bilateral Bryan–Chamorro Treaty. The Costa Rican government viewed the Bryan–Chamorro Treaty between Nicaragua and the United States as a violation of its own sovereign rights as the treaty forbade Nicaragua from granting concessions to build a canal in the San Juan River that marks much of the Costa Rica–Nicaragua border. El Salvador viewed the treaty similarly as it granted the U.S. a naval base in the Gulf of Fonseca which El Salvador viewed as condominium shared between El Salvador, Honduras, and Nicaragua.

On 4 December 1920, delegations from Costa Rica, El Salvador, Guatemala, Honduras, and Nicaragua met in San José, Costa Rica, to negotiate the reestablishment of a united Central American state. (Note: The delegates that negotiated the Pact of Union of Central America were the Costa Ricans Alejandro Alvarado Quirós and Cleto González Víquez, Salvadorans Reyes Arrieta Rossi and Miguel Tomás Medina, Guatemalans Salvador Falla and Carlos Salazar, Hondurans Alberto Uclés and Mariano Vásquez, and Nicaraguans Manuel Pasos Arana and Ramón Castillo.) After five meetings from December 1920 to January 1921, the delegations drafted the Pact of Union of Central America outlining the framework of a Central American state on 17 January 1921, and on 19 January, the delegations of Costa Rica, El Salvador, Guatemala, and Honduras signed a pact. The pact presented the Federation of Central America as the successor of the Federal Republic of Central America.

Nicaragua did not sign the pact as its government was concerned that joining the federation would violate the Bryan–Chamorro Treaty. While the Nicaraguan government did not want to join the federation, many Nicaraguans did and the U.S. sent war munitions to the Nicaraguan government to prevent a rebellion from occurring. The pact's signatories, especially Costa Rica, encouraged the Nicaraguan government to sign the pact and break the Bryan–Chamorro Treaty to no avail. Article XIX of the pact allowed Nicaragua to join the federation whenever it wished. El Salvador ratified the pact on 23 January 1921, followed by Honduras on 25 January and Guatemala on 6 April; the pact stipulated that it would go into full effect once at least three members had ratified it, marking 6 April 1921 as the foundation of the Federation of Central America. Although Costa Rica signed the pact, the Constitutional Congress of Costa Rica rejected it on 21 June 1921 due to various factors including the Nicaraguan government's refusal to join the federation, Costa Rica's geographic separation from the federation due to Nicaragua's non-membership, and Costa Rica's history of not participating in previous reunification attempts.

The pact established the National Constituent Assembly to draft the country's constitution. The assembly consisted of fourteen Salvadorans, fifteen Guatemalans, and fifteen Hondurans. The assembly convened in Tegucigalpa, Honduras in July 1921. It was led by former Honduran president Policarpo Bonilla. The assembly proclaimed the constitution on 9 September 1921 and it was ratified by El Salvador, Guatemala, and Honduras on that same day. The assembly also selected Tegucigalpa as the federation's capital due to its central location should Nicaragua and Costa Rica join; and adopted the federation's flag and coat of arms. In October 1921, the federation's three members held federal executive and legislative elections for members of the executive federal council and the bicameral legislature consisting of the Senate and the Council of Deputies. The elected officials were scheduled to assume office in January 1922.

=== Dissolution ===
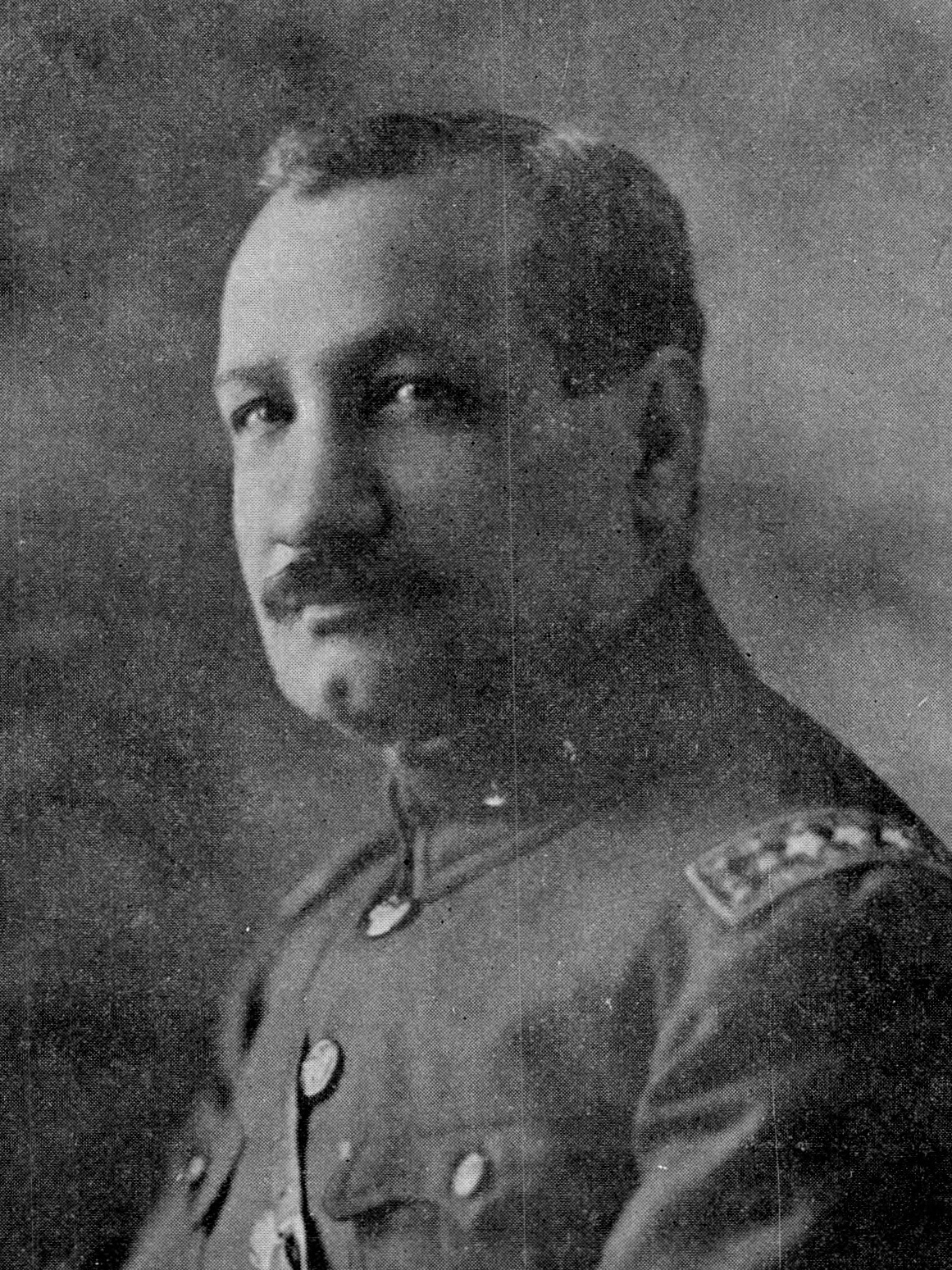
General José María Orellana's coup in Guatemala led to the federation's collapse.

On 5 December 1921, the Guatemalan government of President Carlos Herrera was overthrown by the Armed Forces of Guatemala and the United Fruit Company. Herrera's successor, General José María Orellana, favored a Central American union in principle but opposed the framework of the Federation of Central America. The United States government dissuaded El Salvador and Honduras from launching a military intervention in Guatemala to preserve the federation.

On 28 December 1921, the elected federal councilors and legislators were summoned to Tegucigalpa for its first session. Orellana's government claimed that the October 1921 elections for its federal councilor and deputies were void as they were elected through a secret ballot rather than through a public vote. Guatemala also appointed its senators rather than electing them. The federation's legislature met on 4 January 1922 in Tegucigalpa. The Guatemalan deputies and federal councilor assumed office, but the legislature elected new senators. Guatemala protested this decision and the federal legislature expelled Guatemala from the Federation of Central America. Some Salvadoran and Honduran federal officials continued to meet in Tegucigalpa to determine how to proceed with the federation, but on 29 January, the federal council declared the federation to be dissolved.

Contemporary commentators accused the United States' prevention of an intervention as leading to the federation's downfall, but American historian Kenneth Grieb wrote that the coup was the catalyst for the collapse while the U.S. "merely recognized reality and acknowledged that the Federation was already dead". Regardless, the United States sought to maintain regional stability and held negotiations between the Central American countries in 1922 and 1923 culminating in the signing of the 1923 Central American Treaty of Peace and Amity. In January 1921, member of the Central American legislature told Edward Perry, a contributor to The Hispanic American Historical Review, that the coup "overturned" the federation's politics. The Federation of Central America is the most recent attempt to unite Central America under a single country.

== Government and politics ==
The constitution of the Federation of Central America declared the country to be "perpetual and indissoluble" and designated El Salvador, Guatemala, and Honduras as states within the republic. A federal district was also planned to be established around the country's capital city in Tegucigalpa. It also declared the government to be "republican, popular, and responsible". The federal government consisted of legislative, executive, and judicial branches. The liberals and conservatives were the federation's two primary political factions.

In April 1921, the federation had a population of 4.1 million with a land area of 101,164 square miles (262,010 km^{2}). Julio Bianchi, the Central American ambassador to the United States, stated that the federation's population would be 5 to 6 million and its land area would be 169,000 square miles (440,000 km^{2}) if Nicaragua and Costa Rica joined.

=== Federal government ===
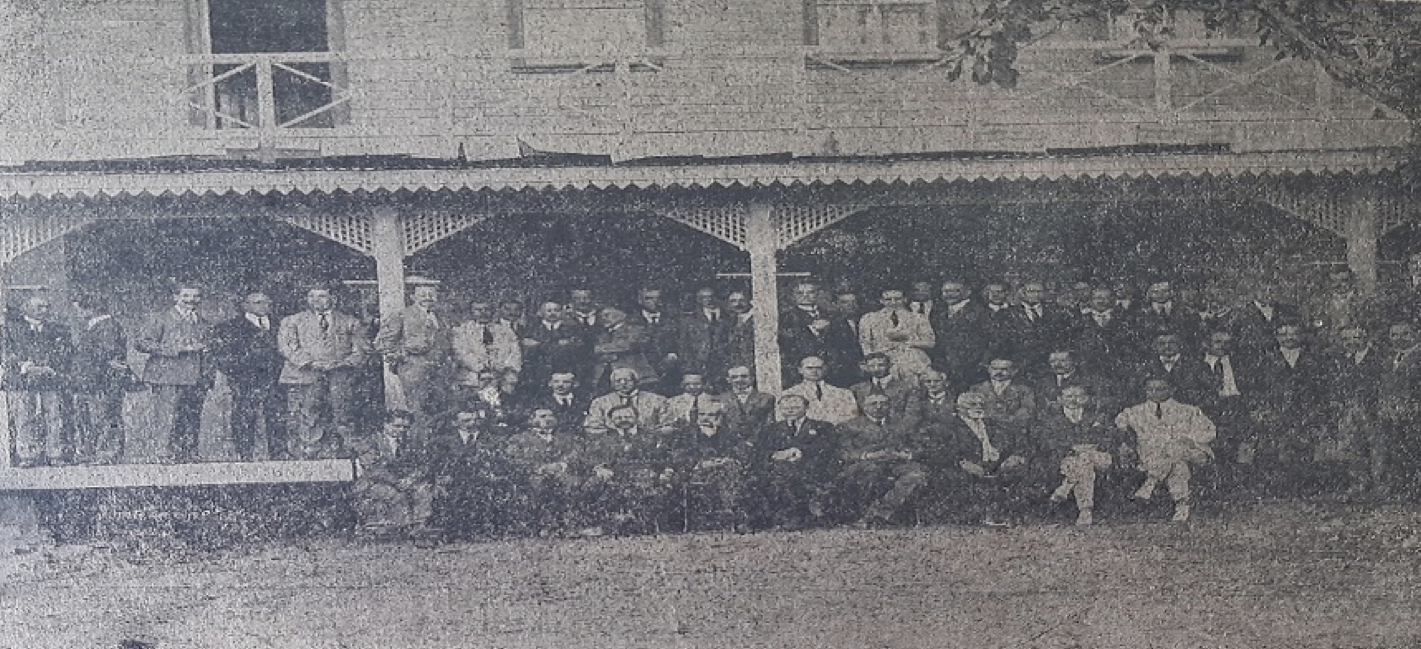
Members of the Central American federal government on 7 August 1921

The federation's bicameral legislature composed of the Senate (upper house) and the Chamber of Deputies (lower house). The Senate consisted of three senators and three substitute senators from each state, while the Chamber of Deputies consisted of one deputy and one substitute deputy representing 100,000 people each. Both chambers of the legislature required three-fourths of its members to be present to reach quorum. Elections for the legislature and executive were to be held through popular vote. Senators were elected for six-year terms, and one-third of the Senate was elected each election cycle. There were no legislative term-limits.

The executive branch was led by a federal council consisting of one delegate and one substitute delegate from each state. Delegates of the federal council were elected for five-year terms. The council elected a president and a vice president from its members for one year terms; they were not allowed to be re-elected consecutively. The president of the council also served as the president of the federation. The Supreme Court consisted of seven justices and three substitute justices elected by the Senate.

=== Citizenship ===
The constitution granted citizenship to anyone born within the federation, with the exception of the children of diplomats, who met one of three requirements: at least 21 years old, at least 18 years old and married, or literate. The constitution further stipulated that by 1928, literacy would become a requirement for citizens to be eligible to vote in state and federal elections. Women were granted suffrage if they were married or widowed, literate, and at least 21 years old; 25 years old and had received a primary education; or possessed a certain amount of wealth. Women were allowed to hold public office as long as they were not elected or if the office held no jurisdiction.

=== Relations with the United States ===
In late 1921, the federal government sent a delegation to the United States seeking diplomatic recognition. Before the federation's creation, U.S. president Woodrow Wilson "unalterably opposed" a united Central America as he believed the new country would oppose the United States. Some Central American leaders in fact accused the United States of deliberately seeking to keep Central America divided to be able to control the region easier.

Wilson's successor, Warren G. Harding, reassessed this position and was more open to supporting such a federation. Secretary of State Charles Evans Hughes did not believe that the federation would threaten the Bryan–Chamorro Treaty. Hughes held that the United States would recognize the federation pending its prospects of success. After the coup in Guatemala, the United States Department of State believed that the federation would likely collapse, and as such, the United States never formally recognized the federation.

== See also ==
- Central American reunification
