= Baroody =

Baroody is a surname of Lebanese origin. Notable people with the name include:

- Benjamin Baroody, American politician, New Hampshire House of Representatives from 1992 to 2012
- Jamil Baroody (1905–1979), Saudi diplomat
- Michael Baroody (born 1946), American lobbyist
- Phoebe Baroody Stanton (1915–2003), née Phoebe Baroody; Lebanese–American architectural historian, professor at Johns Hopkins University from 1955 to 1982
- William Baroody (disambiguation)
  - William J. Baroody Sr. (1916–1980), American politician and president of the American Enterprise Institute, 1962–1978
  - William J. Baroody Jr. (1937–1996), American politician and president of the American Enterprise Institute, 1978–1986
  - Philip Baroody (1971 – Present ), American Martial Arts Master and philanthropist
  - Edward J. Baroody (1971 -Present), American Businessman, CPA, Zoo Health Club national franchise owner
