= Iran–Taiwan relations =

Bilateral relations between Iran and Taiwan

- Iran: Taiwan

Iran–Taiwan relations refer to the bilateral relations between Iran (formally the Islamic Republic of Iran) and Taiwan (formally the Republic of China). From 1920 to 1971, Pahlavi Iran had official diplomatic relations with Taiwan. Since 1971, relations have been conducted indirectly through the Commercial Office of Taipei at Dubai. The Taiwan External Trade Development Council has a trade center in Tehran.

== History ==
=== Early relations ===
Iran–Taiwan relations
- Iran: Taiwan

On 1 June 1920, the Republic of China established relations with Qajar Iran and signed a friendship treaty.

In 1934, Pahlavi Iran established an embassy in Shanghai, which later closed in 1937.

In 1942, the Republic of China established a legation in Tehran. In 1944, Iran did the same in the city of Chungking. On 10 February 1945, both legations were upgraded to become embassies, and both countries appointed ambassadors.

In 1949, following the ROC retreat to Taiwan, both states continued their diplomacy due to a common anti-communist stance in the Cold War. From 1957 until 1971, Iran did not appoint a separate ambassador to Taiwan, with diplomatic duties conducted instead by its ambassador to Japan.

=== Establishing relations ===
In 1955, Iran joined the Baghdad Pact as part of efforts to oppose the Eastern Bloc. The next year, Iran established relations with the anti-communist government of Taiwan. The People's Republic of China criticized Iran in response, and blamed "American imperialism" as the culprit for Tehran's position.[ 4 ]

On 31 December 1956, ROC president Chiang Kai-Shek met with a member of the Senate of Iran, with Chiang advising Iran against negotiations with the "communist thugs" (referring to the People's Republic of China).

In 1958, Iranian monarch Mohammad Reza Pahlavi visited Taiwan where he met with Chiang Kai-Shek, marking the only Iranian state visit to Taiwan.

By the 1960s, as Iran becomes more influential economically and military, the country also began to take a more independent foreign policy while maintaining a pro-American stance. In 1966, the Iranian council of ministers authorized trade between Iran and China. In 1967, the Shah clarified that even though Iran has begun closer relations with countries outside the Western Bloc, including Soviet Union, People's Republic of China, India and Iraq, the country still wary of having its relations with China overtake its relations with the United States.

On 15 April 1971, princess Ashraf Pahlavi visited Beijing after an invitation from the government of China. On 10 May, princess Fatemeh Pahlavi also visited China. Following Nixon's visit to China in July 1971, Iran began developing closer relations with the People's Republic of China.

=== End of relations ===
On 15 August 1971, Iranian representatives met with PRC counterparts in Islamabad to discuss diplomatic recognition, with both governments publishing statements the next day. In response, Taiwanese officials criticized the decision, and relations between Iran and Taiwan ended on 17 August, with the embassies closing the next day.

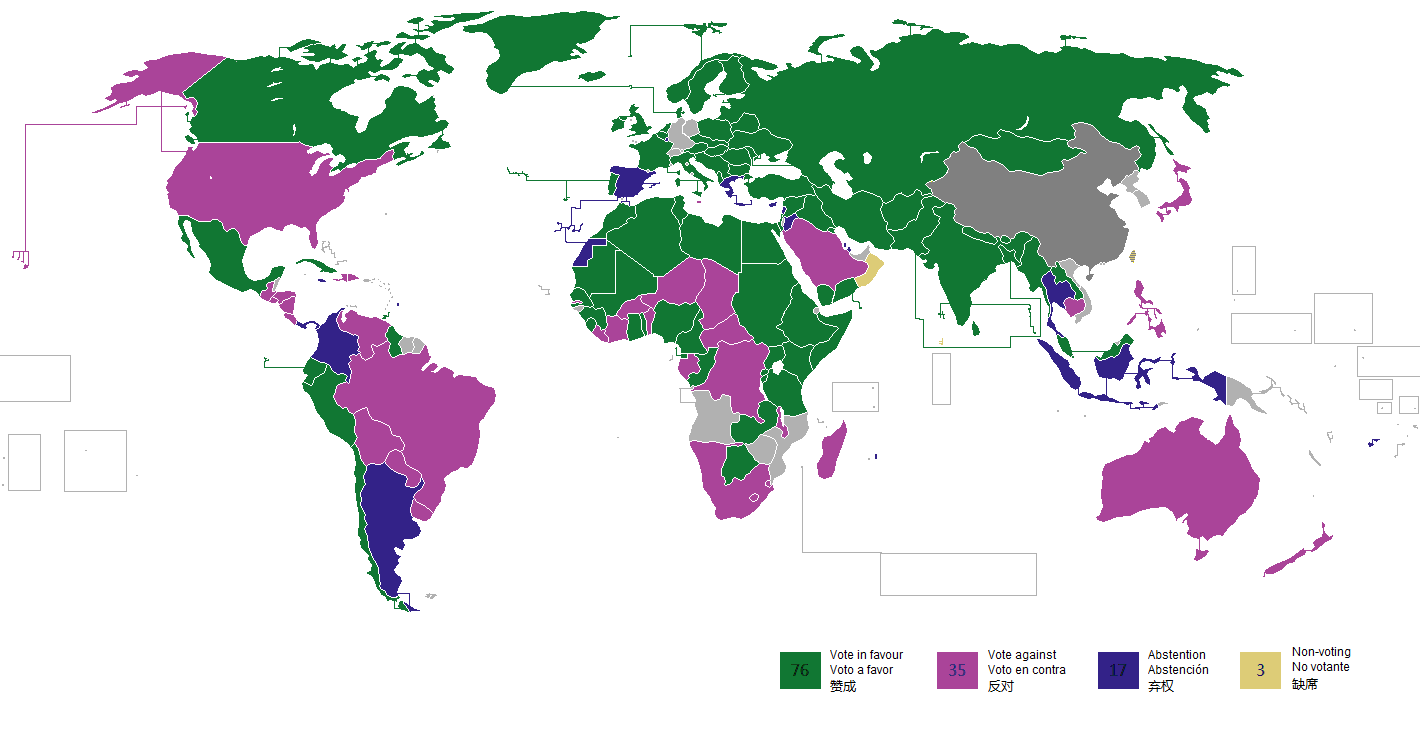
In 1971, Pahlavi Iran voted to support Resolution 2758, which replaced China's representation from the Republic of China to the People's Republic of China.

On 25 October, Iran voted in favor of Resolution 2758, which supported having the People's Republic of China taking over China's representation at the United Nations.

In September 1971, relations between the two countries were tested at the United Nations General Assembly. The Taiwanese delegation was expelled and the People's Republic of China became China's representative at the United Nations. Competing resolutions were put to the test, with Iran, which had recognized the People's Republic, voting for the Albanian resolution that called for the People's Republic to be the sole representative of China, and abstaining from the US resolution that called for a two-thirds majority to expel Taiwan, lest the US embarrass its traditionally friendly country.

=== Islamic Republic of Iran ===
In September 1995, Iran spoke against Taiwan participating in a UN General Assembly meeting.

In 2012, Taiwan paused oil imports from Iran due to international sanctions.

In 2018, the US issued sanctions waivers to eight countries which allowed them to continue importing Iranian oil, however Taiwan decided to cut Iranian imports even under the waiver. Taiwanese imports of Iranian oil ended in 2018.

In 2019, a ship under charter by CPC Corporation carrying naptha from the United Arab Emirates to Taiwan was attacked in the Gulf of Oman close to Iran's coast.

An Iranian newspaper wrote on its front-page in December 2022 that Taiwan has a "legal right" to independence.

Taiwanese President Tsai Ing-wen and Foreign Minister Joseph Wu condemned the April 2024 Iranian strikes against Israel.

In 2025, the American government sanctioned two Taiwanese companies, Mecatron Machinery Co Ltd and Joemars Machinery and Electric Industrial Co Ltd, for providing unmanned aerial vehicle related goods and services to Iran.

== See also ==
- China–Iran relations
- Israel–Taiwan relations
- List of states with limited recognition
- List of diplomatic missions of Taiwan
- List of diplomatic missions in Taiwan
- List of diplomatic missions of Iran
- List of diplomatic missions in Iran
