= William Baroody =

William or Bill Baroody may refer to:

- William J. Baroody Sr. (1916–1980), American politician and president of the American Enterprise Institute, 1962–1978
- William J. Baroody Jr. (1937–1996), American politician and president of the American Enterprise Institute, 1978–1986

== See also ==
- Baroody, a surname
