= International recognition of Taiwan =

International positions regarding the status of Taiwan. People's Republic of China (PRC, Mainland China) Republic of China (ROC, Taiwan Area) States that recognize Taiwan as part of the PRC States that do not recognize Taiwan as a country but have an ambiguous stance on whether it is part of the PRC States that have diplomatic relations with the ROC

Diplomatic relations between world states and the ROC Republic of China (ROC, Taiwan Area) People's Republic of China (PRC, Mainland China) Countries that have formal relations with the PRC only, having no relations at all with the ROC Countries that have formal relations with the PRC only, but have informal relations or mutual de facto embassies with the ROC's Ministry of Foreign Affairs Countries that have formal relations with the ROC only, having no formal relations with the PRC

Following the ROC central government’s retreat since 1949, the effective territories of the Republic of China (ROC) has been limited to Taiwan and its associated islands, and lost control of mainland China due to its defeat in the Chinese Civil War by the Chinese Communist Party (CCP), which established the People's Republic of China (PRC) that same year. The division marked the start of cross-strait relations and the emergence of two rival governments on opposite sides of the Taiwan Strait, each claiming to be the sole legitimate authority over both mainland China and Taiwan. Initially excluded from the United Nations (UN) in favor of the ROC, the PRC on mainland has gradually gained increased recognition and assumed China’s UN seat in 1971 through the United Nations General Assembly Resolution 2758. Since then, the international recognition of the ROC has greatly lessened.

Today, the ROC has formal diplomatic relations with twelve nations but maintains unofficial bilateral ties with other countries through its representative offices, and membership in international organizations as a non-state entity. According to a Lowy Institute tally in January 2025, about 74 percent (142) of the UN member states explicitly endorse the PRC's position that Taiwan is part of China, 23 of those states do not endorse the one-China principle, and others merely acknowledge or respect rather than recognize the PRC position.

== History ==
Because of anti-communist sentiment at the start of the Cold War, the Republic of China was initially recognized as the sole legitimate government of China by the United Nations and most Western nations. On 9 January 1950, the Israeli government extended recognition to the People's Republic of China. United Nations General Assembly Resolution 505, passed on 1 February 1952, considered the CCP to be rebels against the Republic of China.

However, the 1970s saw a switch in diplomatic recognition from the ROC to the PRC. On 25 October 1971, Resolution 2758 was passed by the UN General Assembly, which "decides to restore all its rights to the People's Republic of China and to recognize the representatives of its Government as the only legitimate representatives of China to the United Nations, and to expel forthwith the representatives of Chiang Kai-shek from the place which they unlawfully occupy at the United Nations and in all the organizations related to it." Multiple attempts by the Republic of China to rejoin the UN, no longer to represent all of China but just the people of the territories it governs, have not made it past committee, largely due to diplomatic maneuvering by the PRC, which claims Resolution 2758 has settled the matter.

During the 1990s, there was a diplomatic tug-of-war in which the PRC and ROC attempted to outbid each other to obtain the diplomatic support of small nations. This struggle seems to have slowed as a result of the PRC's growing economic power and doubts in Taiwan as to whether this aid was actually in the Republic of China's interest. Several island nations in the mid-2000s changed their recognition between the two nations. In March 2004, Dominica switched recognition to the PRC in exchange for a large aid package. In late 2004, Vanuatu briefly switched recognition from Beijing to Taipei, followed by a return to its recognition of Beijing. On 20 January 2005, Grenada switched its recognition from Taipei to Beijing, in return for millions in aid (US$1,500 for every Grenadian). On 14 May 2005, Nauru announced the restoration of formal diplomatic relations with Taipei after a three-year hiatus, during which it briefly recognized the People's Republic of China.

On 26 October 2005, Senegal broke off relations with the Republic of China and established diplomatic contacts with Beijing. The following year, on 5 August 2006, Taipei ended relations with Chad when Chad established relations with Beijing. On 26 April 2007, Saint Lucia, which had previously severed ties with the Republic of China following a change of government in December 1996, announced the restoration of formal diplomatic relations with Taipei. On 7 June 2007, Costa Rica broke off diplomatic ties with the Republic of China in favor of the People's Republic of China. In January 2008, Malawi's foreign minister reported Malawi decided to cut diplomatic recognition of the Republic of China and recognize the People's Republic of China.

On 4 November 2013, the Government of the Gambia announced its break-up with Taiwan, but the Foreign Affairs Ministry of China denied any ties with this political movement, adding that they were not considering on building a relation with this African nation. After the 2016 Taiwanese presidential election, China announced in March that it had resumed diplomatic relations with Gambia.

During the presidency of Tsai Ing-wen, ten countries broke official ties with the ROC and switched to the PRC. The latest countries to break off formal diplomatic relations with Taiwan were Burkina Faso on 24 May 2018, El Salvador on 21 August 2018, the Solomon Islands and Kiribati in September 2019, Nicaragua on 9 December 2021, Honduras on 26 March 2023, and Nauru on 15 January 2024.

As of at least 2024, the trend in East Asian governments is generally not to discuss the issue of Taiwan's political status. Academics Xinru Ma and David C. Kang write that when East Asian countries do so, "it is often to caution the United States from getting too far ahead of where even the Taiwanese themselves are."

== Positions of states ==
=== Countries that have official diplomatic relations with the ROC ===
As of 2025, here are the countries who maintain formal diplomatic relations with the ROC, along with their international memberships: Organization of American States (OAS), African Union (AU), Pacific Islands Forum (PIF), or Southern Common Market (Mercosur). Despite recognition of the ROC, these countries recognize the PRC to be a separate country.

#	Country	Recognition date	Membership	Ref.
1	Guatemala	15 June 1933	OAS	
—	Holy See (Vatican City)	23 October 1942		
2	Haiti	25 April 1956	OAS	
3	Paraguay	8 July 1957	OAS, Mercosur	
4	Eswatini^{1}	16 September 1968	AU	
5	Tuvalu	19 September 1979	PIF	
6	Saint Vincent and the Grenadines	15 April 1981	OAS	
7	Saint Kitts and Nevis	23 September 1983	OAS	
8	Saint Lucia^{2}	13 January 1984	OAS	
9	Belize	11 October 1989	OAS	
10	Marshall Islands	20 November 1998	PIF	
11	Palau	29 December 1999	PIF	

=== Countries that have an ambiguous stance regarding the status of Taiwan ===
Several countries have one China policies in which they, while not recognizing Taiwan as a country, acknowledge or take note rather than recognize the PRC position that Taiwan is part of China. Many of these countries retain an ambiguous stance on the political status of Taiwan, considering Taiwan's status as unsettled.

Country	Official position	Ref.
Australia	Details According to the December 1972 joint statement: "The Australian Government recognises the Government of the People's Republic of China as the sole legal Government of China, acknowledges the position of the Chinese Government that Taiwan is a province of the People's Republic of China, and has decided to remove its official representation from Taiwan before 25 January 1973." Official Australian government position: "The terms of our Joint Communiqué dictate the fundamental basis of Australia's one-China policy. The Australian Government does not recognise the ROC as a sovereign state and does not regard the authorities in Taiwan as having the status of a national government."	
Austria	Details The Austrian Ministry of Foreign Affairs states that "In accordance with most States, Austria – like all EU members – pursues the 'One-China-Policy."	
Barbados	Details According to the Barbados government in August 2022: "The Government of Barbados reaffirms its long-standing support for the One China Policy and reiterates its adherence to the Principle of Non-interference in the internal affairs of states. Barbados and the People's Republic of China have close relations based on mutual respect and cooperation and Barbados continues to support China's territorial integrity."	
Belgium	Details According to the October 1971 joint statement: "The Chinese government reiterates that Taiwan is an inalienable part of the territory of the People's Republic of China. The Belgian government takes note of this statement by the Chinese government. The Belgian government recognizes the Government of the People's Republic of China as the sole legal government of China."	
Canada	Details In 1955, Canada adopted a policy of non-involvement in the defence of Formosa (Taiwan), Penghu, and its offshore islands, while expressing deep concern over rising tensions with mainland China. Lester B. Pearson, then Secretary of State for External Affairs at the time, explicitly stated in March 1955 that Canada had no commitment to intervene in the conflict between the two Chinese governments. According to the October 1970 joint statement: "The Chinese Government reaffirms that Taiwan is an inalienable part of the territory of the People's Republic of China. The Canadian Government takes note of this position of the Chinese Government. The Canadian Government recognizes the Government of the People's Republic of China as the sole legal Government of China." According to the December 2009 joint statement: "The Canadian side reiterated its consistent and long-standing One China policy, established at the founding of diplomatic relations, and underlined its support for the peaceful development of cross-Strait relations, including through efforts by both sides to increase dialogue and interactions in economic, political and other fields."	
Cyprus	Details According to a January 2024 statement by the Cypriot government: "With regard to recent elections held in Taiwan, Cyprus reiterates its firm commitment to the One China Policy and its support to the peace and stability in the Taiwan Strait."	
Denmark	Details According to the October 2008 joint statement: "Denmark reiterated its firm adherence to the one-China policy, not supporting Taiwan's membership of international organizations which require statehood, and not having official contacts with Taiwan."	
Finland	Details According to the Finnish government in 2021: "The EU and Finland are committed to their One China policy. They recognise that the People's Republic of China represents China and do not maintain official relations with Taiwan. Finland considers the peaceful development of relations across the Taiwan Strait crucial. Like other EU Member States and peer countries, Finland considers Taiwan an important Asian economy with a functioning democracy and shared values, and it is therefore natural to promote areas such as the economy, trade, education, culture, science, technology, welfare and health. Finland engages in bilateral activities with Taiwan in these areas and in doing so, does not take a position on Taiwan's international status. In line with the EU, Finland also supports Taiwan's meaningful participation in international organisations, which benefits the international community as a whole."	
Greece	Details According to Greek government: "Greece adheres to the 'OneChina' policy, along with the overwhelming majority of the international community, including all Member-States of the European Union."	
Iceland	Details According to the December 1971 joint statement: "The Chinese Government reaffirms that Taiwan is an inalienable part of the territory of the People's Republic of China. The Icelandic Government takes note of this statement of the Chinese Government. The Icelandic Government recognizes the Government of the People's Republic of China as the sole legal Government of China." According to the April 2013 joint statement: "The two sides reaffirmed that they fully respect each others sovereignty and territorial integrity. Iceland firmly adheres to the one-China policy and supports the peaceful development of cross-Strait relations and the course of peaceful reunification of China. The Chinese side appreciates the aforementioned position of the Government of Iceland."	
India	Details According to the June 2003 joint statement: "The Indian side recalled that India was among the first countries to recognize that there is one China and its one China policy remains unaltered. The Chinese side expressed its appreciation of the Indian position."	
Ireland	Details According to the March 2012 joint statement: "Ireland reiterates its firm and unwavering commitment to the one-China policy and its opposition to all comments and propositions aiming at undermining China's territorial integrity. Ireland does not support Taiwan's bid to join any international organization of sovereign states. Ireland supports the peaceful development of relationship across the Taiwan Straits and expresses its support for China's peaceful reunification. The Chinese side appreciates this position."	
Italy	Details According to the November 1970 joint statement: "The Chinese government reiterates that Taiwan is an inalienable part of the territory of the People's Republic of China. The Italian government takes note of this statement by the Chinese government. The Italian government recognizes the Government of the People's Republic of China as the sole legal government of China." According to the Italian government in January 2024: "Fully in line with the One China policy, we hope we can continue to strengthen Italy's economic, commercial and cultural relations with Taipei and that the status quo across the Strait is maintained through constructive and peaceful dialogue."	
Japan	Details According to the September 1972 Japan–China Joint Communiqué: "The Government of Japan recognizes that Government of the People's Republic of China as the sole legal Government of China. The Government of the People's Republic of China reiterates that Taiwan is an inalienable part of the territory of the People's Republic of China. The Government of Japan fully understands and respects this stand of the Government of the People's Republic of China, and it firmly maintains its stand under Article 8 of the Potsdam Proclamation." According to the November 1998 joint statement: "The Japanese side continues to maintain its stand on the Taiwan issue which was set forth in the Joint Communique of the Government of Japan and the Government of the People's Republic of China and reiterates its understanding that there is one China. Japan will continue to maintain its exchanges of private and regional nature with Taiwan."	
Liechtenstein	Details According to the August 2010 meeting: "China appreciates the Liechtenstein government's adherence to the one-China policy."	
Luxembourg	Details According to the November 1972 joint statement: "The Government of the Grand Duchy of Luxembourg affirms that it recognizes the Government of the People's Republic of China as the sole legal government of China." According to the December 2024 Luxembourg government statement: "Luxembourg maintains commercial, economic and cultural ties with Taiwan in accordance with its One China Policy."	
Malta	Details According to the January 1972 joint statement: "The Government of Malta recognizes the Government of the People's Republic of China as the sole legal government of China. The Chinese government reiterates that Taiwan Province is an inseparable part of the territory of the People's Republic of China. The Government of Malta notes this statement from the Chinese government." According to a November 2024 meeting: "The Maltese side ... reiterates its commitment to the one-China policy."	
Monaco	Details According to an April 2007 meeting: "Hu Jintao spoke highly of the achievements made in the development of bilateral relations between China and Monaco since the establishment of diplomatic ties, and praised Prince Albert II, the Monaco royal family and government for consistently adhering to the one-China policy and attaching importance to developing relations with China."	
Netherlands	Details According to the May 1972 joint statement: "The Chinese government reiterates that Taiwan is a province of the People's Republic of China. The Government of the Kingdom of the Netherlands respects this position of the Chinese government and reiterates its recognition of the Government of the People's Republic of China as the sole legal government of China."	
New Zealand	Details According to the December 1972 joint statement: "The Chinese Government reaffirms that Taiwan is an inalienable part of the territory of the People's Republic of China and that Taiwan is a province of the People's Republic of China. The New Zealand Government acknowledges this position of the Chinese Government. The New Zealand Government recognizes the Government of the People's Republic of China as the sole legal government of China." According to the New Zealand government in June 2024: "In reaffirming New Zealand's commitment to its One China Policy, Mr Luxon also noted New Zealand's interest in the peaceful resolution of issues in the Taiwan Strait."	
Norway	Details According to the December 2016 joint statement: "The Norwegian government reiterates its commitment to the one-China policy, fully respects China's sovereignty and territorial integrity, [and] attaches high importance to China's core interests and major concerns."	
San Marino	Details According to the May 1991 joint statement: "The Government of the Republic of San Marino recognizes the Government of the People's Republic of China as the sole legal government of China and notes the position of the Chinese government that Taiwan is an inseparable part of the territory of the People's Republic of China."	
South Korea	Details According to the August 1992 joint statement: "The Government of the Republic of Korea recognizes the Government of the People's Republic of China as the sole legal government of China and respects China's position that there is only one China and that Taiwan is a part of China." According to the July 2014 joint statement: "China reiterates that there is only one China in the world, and Taiwan is an inseparable part of China's territory. South Korea fully understands and respects this, and will continue to uphold the position that the government of the People's Republic of China is the sole legal government representing China and that there is only one China, and supports the peaceful development of cross-strait relations."	
Sweden	Details According to the Swedish government in February 2023: "Sweden's interests in relation to China are best served by a common European approach and transatlantic coordination. This also applies with regard to Taiwan, where we want to continue our cooperation within the framework of the 'One China' policy. China's new tone towards Taiwan is worrying."	
Switzerland	Details According to the September 2007 joint statement: "The Swiss Federal Council recognized the Government of the People's Republic of China as the sole legal government of China on 17th January 1950 and has since then consistently followed the one China policy, including in international organizations, and it reaffirms its intention to adhere to it. The Swiss side wishes to see a peaceful solution to the Taiwan issue and will not support any unilateral action which may increase tensions in the Taiwan Straits and lead to "Taiwan independence". The Chinese side appreciates the Swiss side's one China policy and reiterates its principled stance on the Taiwan issue."	
United Kingdom	Details According to the March 1972 joint statement: "The Government of the United Kingdom, acknowledging the position of the Chinese Government that Taiwan is a province of the People's Republic of China, have decided to remove their official representation in Taiwan on 13th March, 1972. The Government of the United Kingdom recognise the Government of the People's Republic of China as the sole legal Government of China."	
United States	Details Prior to establishing diplomatic relations with the People's Republic of China, the U.S. State Department's official position on Taiwan dated to 1959 was: "That the provisional capital of the Republic of China has been at Taipei, Taiwan (Formosa) since December 1949; that the Government of the Republic of China exercises authority over the island; that the sovereignty of Formosa has not been transferred to China; and that Formosa is not a part of China as a country, at least not as yet, and not until and unless appropriate treaties are hereafter entered into. Formosa may be said to be a territory or an area occupied and administered by the Government of the Republic of China, but is not officially recognized as being a part of the Republic of China." According to the January 1979 Joint Communiqué on the Establishment of Diplomatic Relations: "The United States of America recognizes the Government of the People's Republic of China as the sole legal Government of China. Within this context, the people of the United States will maintain cultural, commercial, and other unofficial relations with the people of Taiwan. ... The Government of the United States of America acknowledges the Chinese position that there is but one China and Taiwan is part of China." Official position of the US government: "The United States approach to Taiwan has remained consistent across decades and administrations. The United States has a longstanding one China policy, which is guided by the Taiwan Relations Act, the three U.S.-China Joint Communiques, and the Six Assurances." The U.S. has not recognized the PRC's sovereignty over Taiwan or Taiwan as a sovereign country, and instead considers Taiwan's status as unsettled.	

=== Countries that recognize Taiwan as a part of China ===
Country	Official position	Ref.
Afghanistan^{3}	Details According to the June 2006 joint statement released by the former Islamic Republic of Afghanistan government: "Afghanistan reiterated that there is only one China in the world, the Government of the People's Republic of China is the sole legal government representing the whole of China, and Taiwan is an inseparable part of China's territory. Afghanistan supports China's efforts to safeguard national sovereignty and territorial integrity, opposes any attempt by the Taiwan authorities to create "two Chinas" or "one China, one Taiwan," and opposes "Taiwan independence," including 'de jure Taiwan independence'." A July 2024 statement from the Taliban-led Islamic Emirate of Afghanistan added that its leadership fully supports the PRC's One China Policy and its proposed major projects said Abdul Salam Hanafi, a Taliban-appointed Deputy Prime Minister.	
Albania	Details According to the 2009 joint statement: "The Albanian side reiterated its firm commitment to the one China policy. It recognizes that there is but one China in the world. The Government of the People's Republic of China is the sole legitimate government representing the whole of China and Taiwan is an inalienable part of China. Albania will not establish official relations or have official exchanges with the Taiwan authorities. Albania opposes Taiwan's joining of any international organization that requires statehood or any form of 'Taiwan independence' separatist activities. Albania respects China's efforts to realize national reunification. The Chinese side highly appreciates the above position of the Albanian side."	
Algeria	Details Algeria joined a joint statement of African countries in September 2024 which reaffirms "its firm commitment to the one-China principle, and reaffirms that there is but one China in the world, Taiwan is an inalienable part of China's territory and the Government of the People's Republic of China is the sole legal government representing the whole of China, and firmly supports all efforts by the Chinese government to achieve national reunification."	
Andorra	Details According to the June 1994 joint statement: "The Government of the Principality of Andorra recognizes the Government of the People's Republic of China as the sole legal government of China, and that Taiwan is an inseparable part of Chinese territory."	
Angola	Details Angola joined a joint statement of African countries in September 2024 which reaffirms "its firm commitment to the one-China principle, and reaffirms that there is but one China in the world, Taiwan is an inalienable part of China's territory and the Government of the People's Republic of China is the sole legal government representing the whole of China, and firmly supports all efforts by the Chinese government to achieve national reunification."	
Antigua and Barbuda	Details According to a 2024 statement: "Antigua and Barbuda firmly believes that Taiwan was, is and will always be a province of China, and Antigua and Barbuda will continue to firmly abide by the one-China principle and firmly support China in safeguarding national sovereignty and territorial integrity."	
Argentina	Details According to the 2018 joint statement: "Argentina reaffirmed its continuous support for the One China policy." In August 2022, Argentinian Ambassador to China Sabino Vaca Narvaja stated that Argentina considers Taiwan to be a part of China.	
Armenia	Details According to a 2015 statement: "The Armenian side has confirmed its support for the 'One China' policy, and stands against any form of the Taiwan independence, reaffirms that it doesn't establish any official relationship with Taiwan, supports peaceful development of relations between the two shores of the Taiwan Strait, as well as the Chinese government's efforts for the country's unification, stating that Taiwan is an inalienable part of the People's Republic of China and the Taiwan issue is China's internal affair."	
Azerbaijan	Details According to the July 2024 joint statement: "Azerbaijan resolutely supports the 'One China' principle, recognizes that there is only one China in the world, the Government of the People's Republic of China is the only legitimate government representing the whole of China, and that Taiwan is an integral part of China's territory, firmly opposes any form of 'Taiwan independence' and supports the peaceful development of relations between the two shores of the Taiwan Strait, as well as the efforts being made by the Chinese Government for the reunification of China."	
Bahamas	Details According to the May 1997 joint statement: "The Bahamas recognizes that there is only one China in the world, the Government of the People's Republic of China is the only legal government of China, and Taiwan is a province of the People's Republic of China."	
Bahrain	Details According to the May 2002 joint statement: "Bahrain reiterates that the Government of the People's Republic of China is the sole legal government representing all the Chinese people, and that Taiwan is an inseparable part of Chinese territory. China appreciates Bahrain's reaffirmation of this position."	
Bangladesh	Details According to the May 2026 joint statement: "Bangladesh emphasized that the authority of the U.N. General Assembly Resolution 2758 is beyond any question or challenge. Bangladesh reiterated its firm adherence to the One-China Principle, and reaffirmed its position that Taiwan is an inalienable part of China’s territory, and the Government of the People’s Republic of China is the sole legal government representing the whole of China. Bangladesh resolutely opposes any form of “Taiwan independence” and firmly supports the Chinese government in achieving national reunification."	
Belarus	Details According to the August 2024 joint statement: "Belarus reiterates its firm adherence to the one-China principle, recognizes that there is only one China in the world, that Taiwan is an inseparable part of China's territory, that the government of the People's Republic of China is the sole legal government representing the whole of China, resolutely opposes any form of 'Taiwan independence,' and firmly supports the Chinese government in achieving national reunification."	
Benin	Details Benin joined a joint statement of African countries in September 2024 which reaffirms "its firm commitment to the one-China principle, and reaffirms that there is but one China in the world, Taiwan is an inalienable part of China's territory and the Government of the People's Republic of China is the sole legal government representing the whole of China, and firmly supports all efforts by the Chinese government to achieve national reunification."	
Bhutan	Details Despite not having diplomatic relations with the People's Republic of China, Bhutan adheres to the one China policy and recognizes China's sovereignty over Taiwan.	
Bolivia	Details According to a May 2024 statement: "The Ministry of Foreign Affairs of the Plurinational State of Bolivia, on behalf of the Bolivian government and people, reaffirms its recognition of the One China principle. It also supports Resolution 2758 of 1971, which states that 'the representatives of the Government of the People's Republic of China are the sole legitimate representatives to the United Nations.' Bolivia welcomes the efforts aimed at the prompt reunification of Taiwan Province. In this regard, it rejects any attempt to disrupt this process and opposes interference in the internal affairs of the People's Republic of China that could affect the peace and stability of the Asia-Pacific region."	
Bosnia and Herzegovina	Details According to the April 1995 joint statement: "The Government of the Republic of Bosnia and Herzegovina recognizes the Government of the People's Republic of China as the sole legal government of China and Taiwan an inalienable part of Chinese territory. The Government of the Republic of Bosnia and Herzegovina undertakes not to establish or develop official relations of any form with Taiwan and will not engage in any official contacts with Taiwan."	
Botswana	Details Botswana joined a joint statement of African countries in September 2024 which reaffirms "its firm commitment to the one-China principle, and reaffirms that there is but one China in the world, Taiwan is an inalienable part of China's territory and the Government of the People's Republic of China is the sole legal government representing the whole of China, and firmly supports all efforts by the Chinese government to achieve national reunification."	
Brazil	Details According to a November 2024 joint statement: "The Brazilian side reiterated its firm adherence to the One China principle, recognized that there is only one China in the world, and that Taiwan is an inseparable part of Chinese territory, while the Government of the People's Republic of China is the only legal government representing all of China. The Brazilian side supports China's efforts to achieve peaceful national reunification. The Chinese side expressed great appreciation in this regard."	
Brunei	Details According to a February 2025 joint statement: "Both sides reaffirmed the importance of UN General Assembly Resolution 2758. Brunei Darussalam reiterated its continued adherence to the One-China Policy and recognizes that Taiwan is an inalienable part of the People's Republic of China. Brunei Darussalam further supports the peaceful development of Cross-Straits relations and the reunification of China."	
Bulgaria	Details According to the November 2006 joint statement: "Bulgaria reiterated its adherence to the one-China principle, namely: recognizing the government of the People's Republic of China as the sole legal government representing the whole of China, and that Taiwan is an inseparable part of China. Bulgaria does not engage in any form of official exchanges with Taiwan and supports the efforts of the government of the People's Republic of China to achieve national reunification through peaceful means. China appreciates Bulgaria's principled position."	
Burkina Faso	Details Burkina Faso joined a joint statement of African countries in September 2024 which reaffirms "its firm commitment to the one-China principle, and reaffirms that there is but one China in the world, Taiwan is an inalienable part of China's territory and the Government of the People's Republic of China is the sole legal government representing the whole of China, and firmly supports all efforts by the Chinese government to achieve national reunification."	
Burundi	Details Burundi joined a joint statement of African countries in September 2024 which reaffirms "its firm commitment to the one-China principle, and reaffirms that there is but one China in the world, Taiwan is an inalienable part of China's territory and the Government of the People's Republic of China is the sole legal government representing the whole of China, and firmly supports all efforts by the Chinese government to achieve national reunification."	
Cape Verde	Details Cape Verde joined a joint statement of African countries in September 2024 which reaffirms "its firm commitment to the one-China principle, and reaffirms that there is but one China in the world, Taiwan is an inalienable part of China's territory and the Government of the People's Republic of China is the sole legal government representing the whole of China, and firmly supports all efforts by the Chinese government to achieve national reunification."	
Cambodia	Details According to the September 2023 joint statement: "The Cambodian side reaffirms resolute adherence to the One-China principle, that the Government of the People's Republic of China is the sole lawful government representing the whole of China, and that Taiwan is an inalienable part of China's territory and China's internal affairs, brooking no foreign interference. Cambodia opposes any attempt to interfere in China's internal affairs or to block or contain China under the subterfuge of Taiwan, or any form of separatist activities seeking "Taiwan independence". Cambodia resolutely supports China's every effort to achieve national reunification, and will not develop any form of official relations with Taiwan." According to the April 2025 joint statement: "The Cambodian side reaffirms its resolute adherence to the one-China principle and that the authority of U.N. General Assembly Resolution 2758 brooks no question or challenge. The Cambodian side recognizes that there is but one China in the world and emphasizes that the government of the People's Republic of China is the sole legal government representing the whole of China, and Taiwan is an inalienable part of China's territory. Cambodia resolutely supports China's every effort to achieve national reunification, firmly opposes any form of "Taiwan independence", and will not develop any form of official relations with Taiwan. The Cambodian side opposes the use of issues related to Taiwan, Xinjiang, Xizang and Hong Kong by any external forces to interfere in China's internal affairs or contain China."	
Cameroon	Details Cameroon joined a joint statement of African countries in September 2024 which reaffirms "its firm commitment to the one-China principle, and reaffirms that there is but one China in the world, Taiwan is an inalienable part of China's territory and the Government of the People's Republic of China is the sole legal government representing the whole of China, and firmly supports all efforts by the Chinese government to achieve national reunification."	
Central African Republic	Details The Central African Republic joined a joint statement of African countries in September 2024 which reaffirms "its firm commitment to the one-China principle, and reaffirms that there is but one China in the world, Taiwan is an inalienable part of China's territory and the Government of the People's Republic of China is the sole legal government representing the whole of China, and firmly supports all efforts by the Chinese government to achieve national reunification."	
Chad	Details Chad joined a joint statement of African countries in September 2024 which reaffirms "its firm commitment to the one-China principle, and reaffirms that there is but one China in the world, Taiwan is an inalienable part of China's territory and the Government of the People's Republic of China is the sole legal government representing the whole of China, and firmly supports all efforts by the Chinese government to achieve national reunification."	
Chile	Details According to a January 2024 by the Chilean Ministry of Foreign Affairs: "Regarding the recent elections in Taiwan, Chile reaffirms its long-standing and unwavering commitment to the one-China principle. This was reiterated in the Joint Bilateral Declaration signed during President [Gabriel] Boric's visit to the People's Republic of China in October 2023. Chile supports the peaceful reunification of China and advocates for peace and stability in the Asia-Pacific region." According to the joint press statement in April 2008: "President [Michelle] Bachelet reiterated that Chile...respects the sovereignty and territorial integrity of the People's Republic of China and recognizes Taiwan and Tibet as part of China. China appreciates Chile's position on this matter."	
Colombia	Details According to the October 2023 joint statement: "The Colombian government reiterated its adherence to the one-China principle, recognized the Government of the People's Republic of China as the sole legal government representing the whole of China, and affirmed that Taiwan is an inseparable part of China's territory. The government firmly supports the Chinese government's efforts to achieve national reunification."	
Comoros	Details Comoros joined a joint statement of African countries in September 2024 which reaffirms "its firm commitment to the one-China principle, and reaffirms that there is but one China in the world, Taiwan is an inalienable part of China's territory and the Government of the People's Republic of China is the sole legal government representing the whole of China, and firmly supports all efforts by the Chinese government to achieve national reunification."	
Congo	Details The Republic of the Congo joined a joint statement of African countries in September 2024 which reaffirms "its firm commitment to the one-China principle, and reaffirms that there is but one China in the world, Taiwan is an inalienable part of China's territory and the Government of the People's Republic of China is the sole legal government representing the whole of China, and firmly supports all efforts by the Chinese government to achieve national reunification."	
Costa Rica	Details According to the February 2024 meeting: "Vice Minister [Lydia] Peralta [Cordero] reiterated Costa Rica's firm position regarding the absolute respect for the One China principle, stating that 'no action will distract the Costa Rican government from this principle and that we will continue working together with you to send the appropriate signals in this direction.'" According to a joint press statement in June 2007: "The Costa Rican government recognizes that there is only one China in the world and the government of the People's Republic of China is the sole legitimate government representing the whole China. Taiwan is an inalienable part of the Chinese territory."	
Croatia	Details According to an August 2007 statement: "By signing the Protocol on the Establishment of Diplomatic Relations with the People's Republic of China on 13 May 1992, the Republic of Croatia accepted the One-China principle, founded on the sovereignty and territorial integrity of the People's Republic of China, as well as the position on Taiwan being its constituent part, with which peaceful unity is to be reached in accordance with the one country – two systems model."	
Cuba	Details According to a January 2024 statement: "The Ministry of Foreign Affairs of the Republic of Cuba reiterates its resolute and unwavering adherence to the 'one China' principle and recognizes Taiwan as an inalienable part of China's territory. ...Cuba further recognizes and supports the Chinese government's efforts to achieve national reunification."	
Czech Republic	Details According to a Czech foreign policy statement: "For over three decades, the Czech Republic has been promoting, within the framework of its One China policy, the development of relations and cooperation with Taiwan as a democratic partner, primarily in the economic, cultural, scientific and educational fields." According to the joint statement in 2000: "[T]he Czech side reiterates that it ... recognizes that Taiwan is an inalienable part of the Chinese territory."	
Democratic Republic of the Congo	Details The Democratic Republic of the Congo joined a joint statement of African countries in September 2024 which reaffirms "its firm commitment to the one-China principle, and reaffirms that there is but one China in the world, Taiwan is an inalienable part of China's territory and the Government of the People's Republic of China is the sole legal government representing the whole of China, and firmly supports all efforts by the Chinese government to achieve national reunification."	
Djibouti	Details Djibouti joined a joint statement of African countries in September 2024 which reaffirms "its firm commitment to the one-China principle, and reaffirms that there is but one China in the world, Taiwan is an inalienable part of China's territory and the Government of the People's Republic of China is the sole legal government representing the whole of China, and firmly supports all efforts by the Chinese government to achieve national reunification."	
Dominica	Details According to the Dominican Prime Minister Roosevelt Skerrit in January 2024: "Dominica supports the 'one China principle' and continues to advocate for the peaceful reunification of Taiwan to a motherland, the People's Republic of China." According to the Dominican government in January 2024: "Dominica has stated that Taiwan, despite any attempt or pronouncement otherwise, remains part of the One China, notwithstanding the results of the January 13, 2024, local government elections."	
Dominican Republic	Details According to the May 2018 joint statement: "The Government of the Dominican Republic recognizes that there is but one China in the world, that the Government of the People's Republic of China is the sole legal government representing the whole of China, and that Taiwan is an inalienable part of China's territory. Hence the Government of the Dominican Republic severs 'diplomatic relations' with Taiwan as of this day. The Government of the People's Republic of China appreciates this position of the Government of the Dominican Republic."	
Ecuador	Details According to the January 2022 joint statement: "Ecuador reiterates its firm adherence to the one-China principle, supports the Chinese government's efforts to achieve national reunification, and congratulates the Communist Party of China on its centenary." According to the Ecuadorian government: "The Taiwan issue is an internal matter for China."	
Egypt	Details Egypt joined a joint statement of African countries in September 2024 which reaffirms "its firm commitment to the one-China principle, and reaffirms that there is but one China in the world, Taiwan is an inalienable part of China's territory and the Government of the People's Republic of China is the sole legal government representing the whole of China, and firmly supports all efforts by the Chinese government to achieve national reunification."	
El Salvador	Details According to the December 2019 statement: "Both sides agree that upholding the one-China principle is a universal consensus of the international community and the fundamental premise and political foundation for the establishment and development of relations between China and El Salvador. The government of El Salvador supports UN Resolution 2758. El Salvador reiterates that the government of the People's Republic of China is the sole legal government representing the whole of China, and that Taiwan is an inseparable part of China's territory. El Salvador will adhere to the one-China principle, resolutely oppose any actions that violate this principle, oppose any form of 'Taiwan independence,' and actively support all efforts made by the Chinese government to achieve the peaceful reunification of the country."	
Equatorial Guinea	Details Equatorial Guinea joined a joint statement of African countries in September 2024 which reaffirms "its firm commitment to the one-China principle, and reaffirms that there is but one China in the world, Taiwan is an inalienable part of China's territory and the Government of the People's Republic of China is the sole legal government representing the whole of China, and firmly supports all efforts by the Chinese government to achieve national reunification."	
Eritrea	Details Eritrea joined a joint statement of African countries in September 2024 which reaffirms "its firm commitment to the one-China principle, and reaffirms that there is but one China in the world, Taiwan is an inalienable part of China's territory and the Government of the People's Republic of China is the sole legal government representing the whole of China, and firmly supports all efforts by the Chinese government to achieve national reunification."	
Estonia	Details According to the September 1991 joint statement: "The Government of the Republic of Estonia recognizes the Government of the People's Republic of China as the sole legal government of China, and that Taiwan is an inalienable part of Chinese territory. The Government of the Republic of Estonia pledges not to establish any form of formal or official relations with Taiwan." According to the Estonian government in November 2023: "Estonia is guided by the 'One China policy."	
Ethiopia	Details Ethiopia joined a joint statement of African countries in September 2024 which reaffirms "its firm commitment to the one-China principle, and reaffirms that there is but one China in the world, Taiwan is an inalienable part of China's territory and the Government of the People's Republic of China is the sole legal government representing the whole of China, and firmly supports all efforts by the Chinese government to achieve national reunification."	
Fiji	Details According to the May 2002 joint statement: "The Fijian side reiterates its support for the position of the Government of the People's Republic of China that there is but one China in the world, that the Government of the People's Republic of China is the sole legal government representing the whole of China and that Taiwan is an inalienable part of Chinese territory. The Fijian side further agrees that the question of Taiwan is entirely China's internal affairs and that it respects and supports the efforts of China in safeguarding its national unity and hopes to see its early reunification. Accordingly the Fijian side reassures the Government of the People's Republic of China that its relationship with Taiwan is strictly for the purpose of promoting economic and commercial ties and it will not engage in any form of contact with Taiwan that is not consistent to the one China position of the People's Republic of China."	
France	Details According to the January 1994 joint statement: "The French side confirmed that the French government recognizes the government of the People's Republic of China as the sole legitimate government of China, and Taiwan as an integral part of Chinese territory."	
Gabon	Details Gabon joined a joint statement of African countries in September 2024 which reaffirms "its firm commitment to the one-China principle, and reaffirms that there is but one China in the world, Taiwan is an inalienable part of China's territory and the Government of the People's Republic of China is the sole legal government representing the whole of China, and firmly supports all efforts by the Chinese government to achieve national reunification."	
The Gambia	Details The Gambia joined a joint statement of African countries in September 2024 which reaffirms "its firm commitment to the one-China principle, and reaffirms that there is but one China in the world, Taiwan is an inalienable part of China's territory and the Government of the People's Republic of China is the sole legal government representing the whole of China, and firmly supports all efforts by the Chinese government to achieve national reunification."	
Georgia	Details According to the June 1992 joint statement: "The Government of the Republic of Georgia recognizes the Government of the People's Republic of China as the sole legal government of China, and that Taiwan is an inalienable part of Chinese territory. The Government of the Republic of Georgia confirms that it will not establish any form of official relations with Taiwan." According to the August 2023 joint statement: "Georgia firmly adheres to the one-China principle."	
Germany	Details Position of the German government in 2023: "One-China policy: The One-China policy remains the basis for our actions. We only have diplomatic relations with the People's Republic of China. Germany has close and good relations with Taiwan in many areas and wants to expand them. As part of the EU's One-China policy, we support issue-specific involvement on the part of democratic Taiwan in international organisations. The status quo of the Taiwan Strait may only be changed by peaceful means and mutual consent. Military escalation would also affect German and European interests." In January 2008, German Minister for Foreign Affairs Frank-Walter Steinmeier reportedly indicated that Germany holds that Taiwan is part of China. According to the Lowy Institute's correspondence with Germany's Federal Foreign Office, other German officials have made similar statements.	
Ghana	Details Ghana joined a joint statement of African countries in September 2024 which reaffirms "its firm commitment to the one-China principle, and reaffirms that there is but one China in the world, Taiwan is an inalienable part of China's territory and the Government of the People's Republic of China is the sole legal government representing the whole of China, and firmly supports all efforts by the Chinese government to achieve national reunification."	
Grenada	Details According to the January 2023 joint statement: "The Government of Grenada reaffirms its commitment to the One China Principle and in this regard maintains its position that the question of Taiwan remains an internal issue concerning the People's Republic of China."	
Guinea	Details Guinea joined a joint statement of African countries in September 2024 which reaffirms "its firm commitment to the one-China principle, and reaffirms that there is but one China in the world, Taiwan is an inalienable part of China's territory and the Government of the People's Republic of China is the sole legal government representing the whole of China, and firmly supports all efforts by the Chinese government to achieve national reunification."	
Guinea-Bissau	Details Guinea-Bissau joined a joint statement of African countries in September 2024 which reaffirms "its firm commitment to the one-China principle, and reaffirms that there is but one China in the world, Taiwan is an inalienable part of China's territory and the Government of the People's Republic of China is the sole legal government representing the whole of China, and firmly supports all efforts by the Chinese government to achieve national reunification."	
Guyana	Details According to the Guyanese government in February 2021: "The Government of Guyana wishes to clarify that it continues to adhere to the One China policy and its diplomatic relations remain intact with the People's Republic of China." Vietnam follows the "One China" policy and recognizes Taiwan as a part of China's territory.	
Honduras	Details According to the March 2023 joint statement: "The Government of the Republic of Honduras recognizes that there is but one China in the world, the Government of the People's Republic of China is the sole legal Government representing the whole of China, and Taiwan is an inalienable part of China's territory. The Government of the Republic of Honduras shall sever 'diplomatic relations' with Taiwan as of this day and undertakes that it shall no longer develop any official relations or official exchanges with Taiwan."	
Hungary	Details According to the December 2000 joint statement: "The government of the Republic of Hungary reiterated its respect for China's sovereignty and territorial integrity and its adherence to the One China principle. It recognized that there is only one China in the world; Taiwan is an inalienable part of the Chinese territory and the government of the People's Republic of China is the sole legitimate government representing China. Hungary will not have official contacts with Taiwan. Hungary will only conduct economic and cultural exchanges within the non-official, non-governmental scope and of private nature."	
Indonesia	Details According to the November 2024 joint statement: "Indonesia reiterates its consistent adherence to one-China principle, which is reaffirmed by the UN General Assembly Resolution 2758, and its recognition that the Government of the People's Republic of China is the sole legal government representing the whole of China and that Taiwan is an inalienable part of China and firmly supports the Chinese Government's efforts to achieve peaceful national reunification."	
Iran	Details According to the Iranian government in August 2022: "The Foreign Ministry spokesman added that respect for the territorial integrity of other countries is a fundamental principle of the foreign policy of Iran and support for the one-China principle is undeniable in line with this tenet. [Iranian Foreign Ministry Spokesman Nasser] Kanaani said the recent destabilizing move of the US regime officials to interference in the internal affairs of the People's Republic of China and to violate the territorial integrity of the country is an example of the US's meddlesome behavior in different regions and countries of the world. He noted that this behavior will only intensify instability and stokes differences, and, as such, it is deplorable."	
Iraq	Details According to the December 2015 joint statement: "Iraq firmly adheres to the one-China principle and supports China's position on Xinjiang-related issues." According to an August 2024 meeting: "The head of the [Asia and Australia] department [Haider Radhi Nasir Al-Shimirti] pointed out that Iraq is supporting the fixed positions that emphasize on the principle of One China and the respect for the countries' sovereignty and the non-interference in internal affairs."	
Israel	Details According to the January 1992 joint statement: "The Government of the State of Israel recognizes that the Government of the People's Republic of China is the sole legal government representing the whole of China and Taiwan is an inalienable part of the territory of the People's Republic of China." According to an April 2022 meeting: "Israel regards China as a friend and has always adhered to the one-China principle since the establishment of diplomatic ties."	
Ivory Coast	Details Ivory Coast joined a joint statement of African countries in September 2024 which reaffirms "its firm commitment to the one-China principle, and reaffirms that there is but one China in the world, Taiwan is an inalienable part of China's territory and the Government of the People's Republic of China is the sole legal government representing the whole of China, and firmly supports all efforts by the Chinese government to achieve national reunification."	
Jamaica	Details According to a January 2024 statement by the Jamaican government: "We shared pride in Jamaica and China marking 51 years of diplomatic relations, acknowledging that Jamaica was among the first in the English-speaking Caribbean to recognise the 'One China' Policy and that we still adhere to it today, underpinning shared developmental values and mutual trust, strong cultural and commercial ties and strong bilateral cooperation." Jamaica follows the One China principle and recognizes Taiwan as an inseparable part of China's territory.	
Jordan	Details According to the September 2015 joint statement: "The Jordanian side reiterated its firm adherence to the one-China policy, stating that Taiwan is an inseparable part of China's territory and supporting the efforts made by the Chinese government to achieve peaceful development of cross-strait relations and national reunification."	
Kazakhstan	Details According to the July 2024 joint statement: "Kazakhstan firmly supports the one-China principle, namely that there is only one China in the world, Taiwan is an inseparable part of China's territory, and the government of the People's Republic of China is the sole legal government representing the whole of China. Kazakhstan opposes any form of 'Taiwan independence,' opposes interference by external forces, reiterates its non-official exchanges with Taiwan in any form, and supports all efforts made by the Chinese government to achieve national reunification."	
Kenya	Details Kenya joined a joint statement of African countries in September 2024 which reaffirms "its firm commitment to the one-China principle, and reaffirms that there is but one China in the world, Taiwan is an inalienable part of China's territory and the Government of the People's Republic of China is the sole legal government representing the whole of China, and firmly supports all efforts by the Chinese government to achieve national reunification."	
Kiribati	Details According to the September 2019 statement: "The Government of the Republic of Kiribati recognizes that there is but one China in the world, the Government of the People's Republic of China is the sole legal Government representing the whole of China, and that Taiwan is an inalienable part of China's territory. The Government of the Republic of Kiribati shall sever 'diplomatic relations' with Taiwan as of this day and undertakes that it shall no longer develop any official relations or official exchanges with Taiwan. The Government of the People's Republic of China appreciates this position of the Government of the Republic of Kiribati."	
Kuwait	Details According to the June 2018 statement: "Kuwait reiterates its firm adherence to the one-China principle, that Taiwan is an inseparable part of China's territory, supports the peaceful development of cross-strait relations and China's cause of peaceful reunification, and supports the Chinese government's position on the Taiwan issue."	
Kyrgyzstan	Details According to the May 2023 joint statement: "Kyrgyzstan reiterated its adherence to the one-China principle, stating that the government of the People's Republic of China is the sole legal government representing the whole of China, and Taiwan is an inseparable part of China's territory. Kyrgyzstan opposes any attempt to interfere in China's internal affairs using the Taiwan issue, opposes any form of 'Taiwan independence,' and firmly supports all efforts made by the Chinese government to achieve national reunification."	
Laos	Details According to the October 2024 joint statement: "Laos reiterated its firm adherence to the one-China principle, acknowledging that there is only one China in the world, that the government of the People's Republic of China is the sole legal government representing the whole of China, and that Taiwan is an inseparable part of China's territory. Laos opposed any words or actions that undermine China's sovereignty and territorial integrity, opposed any form of "Taiwan independence" separatist activities, opposed external forces interfering in China's internal affairs under any pretext, and supported all efforts made by China to achieve national reunification."	
Latvia	Details According to the September 1991 joint statement: "The Government of the Republic of Latvia Recognizes the Government of the People's Republic of China as the sole legal Government of China and Taiwan as an inalienable part of the Chinese territory. The Government of the Republic of Latvia undertakes the obligation not to establish official relations or engage in official contacts with Taiwan." According to a May 2022 meeting: "The Head of Directorate [Juris Štālmeistars] reaffirmed Latvia's unwavering support for the 'One China' principle, which underpins the diplomatic relations between Latvia and China."	
Lebanon	Details According to the November 1971 joint statement: "The Chinese government reiterates that Taiwan is an inalienable part of the territory of the People's Republic of China. The Lebanese government takes note of this statement by the Chinese government. The Lebanese government recognizes the Government of the People's Republic of China as the sole legal government of China." According to an April 2024 meeting: "[Secretary-General of the Ministry of Foreign Affairs] Hani Al Shemaitli said Lebanon attaches great importance to developing relations with China, firmly pursues the one-China policy, firmly supports China in safeguarding its national sovereignty and territorial integrity, and firmly opposes interference by external forces in China's internal affairs." Lebanon follows the One China principle and recognizes Taiwan as an inseparable part of China's territory.	
Lesotho	Details Lesotho joined a joint statement of African countries in September 2024 which reaffirms "its firm commitment to the one-China principle, and reaffirms that there is but one China in the world, Taiwan is an inalienable part of China's territory and the Government of the People's Republic of China is the sole legal government representing the whole of China, and firmly supports all efforts by the Chinese government to achieve national reunification."	
Liberia	Details Liberia joined a joint statement of African countries in September 2024 which reaffirms "its firm commitment to the one-China principle, and reaffirms that there is but one China in the world, Taiwan is an inalienable part of China's territory and the Government of the People's Republic of China is the sole legal government representing the whole of China, and firmly supports all efforts by the Chinese government to achieve national reunification."	
Libya	Details Libya joined a joint statement of African countries in September 2024 which reaffirms "its firm commitment to the one-China principle, and reaffirms that there is but one China in the world, Taiwan is an inalienable part of China's territory and the Government of the People's Republic of China is the sole legal government representing the whole of China, and firmly supports all efforts by the Chinese government to achieve national reunification."	
Lithuania	Details According to the September 1991 joint statement: "The Government of the Republic of Lithuania recognizes the Government of the People's Republic of China as the sole legal government of China, and that Taiwan is an inalienable part of Chinese territory. The Government of the Republic of Lithuania pledges not to establish official relations or conduct official exchanges with Taiwan." According to the Lithuanian government: "Lithuania reaffirms its adherence to the 'One China' policy, but at the same time has the right to expand cooperation with Taiwan and to receive and establish non-diplomatic representations for ensuring the practical development of such ties, the way many other countries do."	
Madagascar	Details Madagascar joined a joint statement of African countries in September 2024 which reaffirms "its firm commitment to the one-China principle, and reaffirms that there is but one China in the world, Taiwan is an inalienable part of China's territory and the Government of the People's Republic of China is the sole legal government representing the whole of China, and firmly supports all efforts by the Chinese government to achieve national reunification."	
Malawi	Details Malawi joined a joint statement of African countries in September 2024 which reaffirms "its firm commitment to the one-China principle, and reaffirms that there is but one China in the world, Taiwan is an inalienable part of China's territory and the Government of the People's Republic of China is the sole legal government representing the whole of China, and firmly supports all efforts by the Chinese government to achieve national reunification."	
Malaysia	Details According to the June 2024 joint statement: "Malaysia reaffirmed the principles of the joint communiqué signed by the leaders of the two countries on May 31, 1974, firmly adhered to the one-China policy, recognized Taiwan as an inseparable part of the territory of the People's Republic of China, supported China's national reunification, and did not support any "Taiwan independence" propositions."	
Maldives	Details According to the January 2024 joint statement: "The Maldives is firmly committed to the one-China principle, recognizing that there is but one China in the world, the Government of the People's Republic of China is the sole legal government representing the whole of China, and Taiwan is an inalienable part of China's territory. The Maldives opposes any statement or action that undermines China's sovereignty and territorial integrity, opposes all 'Taiwan independence' separatist activities, and will not develop any form of official relations with Taiwan. The Maldives opposes external interference in China's internal affairs under any pretext and supports all efforts made by China to achieve national reunification."	
Mali	Details Mali joined a joint statement of African countries in September 2024 which reaffirms "its firm commitment to the one-China principle, and reaffirms that there is but one China in the world, Taiwan is an inalienable part of China's territory and the Government of the People's Republic of China is the sole legal government representing the whole of China, and firmly supports all efforts by the Chinese government to achieve national reunification."	
Mauritania	Details Mauritania joined a joint statement of African countries in September 2024 which reaffirms "its firm commitment to the one-China principle, and reaffirms that there is but one China in the world, Taiwan is an inalienable part of China's territory and the Government of the People's Republic of China is the sole legal government representing the whole of China, and firmly supports all efforts by the Chinese government to achieve national reunification."	
Mauritius	Details Mauritius joined a joint statement of African countries in September 2024 which reaffirms "its firm commitment to the one-China principle, and reaffirms that there is but one China in the world, Taiwan is an inalienable part of China's territory and the Government of the People's Republic of China is the sole legal government representing the whole of China, and firmly supports all efforts by the Chinese government to achieve national reunification."	
Mexico	Details According to the June 2013 joint statement: "Mexico reiterated its firm adherence to the one-China principle and its position that Taiwan and Tibet are inseparable parts of Chinese territory, and that Tibetan affairs are China's internal affairs. China expressed its appreciation and gratitude for this."	
Micronesia	Details According to the April 2024 joint statement: "Micronesia reiterated its firm adherence to the one-China principle and its position that Taiwan and Tibet are inseparable parts of Chinese territory, and that Tibetan affairs are China's internal affairs. China expressed its appreciation and gratitude for this."	
Moldova	Details According to the June 2000 joint statement: "The Republic of Moldova reiterates that there is only one China in the world, the Government of the People's Republic of China is the sole legal government of China, and Taiwan is an inseparable part of China's territory. It supports China's early reunification. The Government of the Republic of Moldova reiterates that it will not establish any form of official relations or conduct official exchanges with Taiwan, and does not support Taiwan's accession to international organizations that only sovereign states can join."	
Mongolia	Details According to the January 2002 joint statement: "Mongolia reiterated that the Government of the People's Republic of China is the sole legal government representing the whole of China, and that Taiwan is an inseparable part of Chinese territory. Mongolia expressed its support for China's "one country, two systems" policy and peaceful reunification on the Taiwan issue, and stated that it does not support 'Taiwan independence'." According to the February 2022 joint statement: "Mongolia reiterates its firm adherence to the one-China principle and supports China's position on issues related to Taiwan, Hong Kong, Xinjiang, and Tibet."	
Montenegro	Details According to the July 2006 joint statement: "The Republic of Montenegro recognizes that there is only one China in the world, that the Government of the People's Republic of China is the sole legal government representing the whole of China, that Taiwan is an inseparable part of Chinese territory, opposes any form of 'Taiwan independence,' and opposes Taiwan's accession to any international or regional organizations that require the participation of sovereign states. The Republic of Montenegro pledges not to establish any form of official relations or conduct any official exchanges with Taiwan."	
Morocco	Details Morocco joined a joint statement of African countries in September 2024 which reaffirms "its firm commitment to the one-China principle, and reaffirms that there is but one China in the world, Taiwan is an inalienable part of China's territory and the Government of the People's Republic of China is the sole legal government representing the whole of China, and firmly supports all efforts by the Chinese government to achieve national reunification."	
Mozambique	Details Mozambique joined a joint statement of African countries in September 2024 which reaffirms "its firm commitment to the one-China principle, and reaffirms that there is but one China in the world, Taiwan is an inalienable part of China's territory and the Government of the People's Republic of China is the sole legal government representing the whole of China, and firmly supports all efforts by the Chinese government to achieve national reunification."	
Myanmar	Details According to the Myanmar Ministry of Foreign Affairs: "Myanmar fully supports the "One China Policy" and reaffirms that Taiwan is an integral part of the People's Republic of China." According to the January 2020 joint statement: "Myanmar reiterated its firm adherence to the one-China policy, stating that Taiwan, Tibet, and Xinjiang are inseparable parts of the People's Republic of China, and supporting China's measures in handling issues related to Taiwan, Tibet, and Xinjiang."	
Namibia	Details Namibia joined a joint statement of African countries in September 2024 which reaffirms "its firm commitment to the one-China principle, and reaffirms that there is but one China in the world, Taiwan is an inalienable part of China's territory and the Government of the People's Republic of China is the sole legal government representing the whole of China, and firmly supports all efforts by the Chinese government to achieve national reunification."	
Nauru	Details According to the January 2024 joint statement: "The Government of the Republic of Nauru recognizes that there is but one China in the world, the Government of the People's Republic of China is the sole legal Government representing the whole of China, and Taiwan is an inalienable part of China's territory. The Government of the Republic of Nauru shall sever "diplomatic relations" with Taiwan as of this day and undertakes that it shall no longer develop any official relations or official exchanges with Taiwan." According to the March 2024 joint statement: "Both sides agreed that all countries are equal regardless of size, strength, wealth or poverty. China firmly supports Nauru in safeguarding its national sovereignty, security and development interests, and supports Nauru in independently choosing a development path that suits its national conditions. Nauru reiterated its firm adherence to the one-China principle, recognized that there is only one China in the world, the government of the People's Republic of China is the only legitimate government representing all of China, and Taiwan is an inalienable part of China's territory; it firmly opposes any form of 'Taiwan independence', opposes external forces interfering in China's internal affairs, and firmly supports all efforts made by the Chinese government to achieve national reunification. Nauru believes that issues related to Hong Kong, Xinjiang and Tibet are China's internal affairs, and reiterates the principle of non-interference in the internal affairs of other sovereign states."	
Nepal	Details According to the December 2024 joint statement: "Recalling the U.N. General Assembly Resolution 2758, Nepal reaffirmed its firm commitment to the one-China principle, recognizing that the Government of the People's Republic of China is the sole legal government representing the whole of China and Taiwan is an inalienable part of China's territory. Nepal firmly supports China's efforts to achieve its national reunification and opposes 'Taiwan independence'."	
Nicaragua	Details According to the December 2023 joint statement: "Nicaragua firmly adheres to the one-China principle, reiterates that the Government of the People's Republic of China is the sole legal government representing the whole of China, and that Taiwan is an inseparable part of China's territory; resolutely opposes any form of 'Taiwan independence,' reiterates its non-official exchanges with Taiwan in any form, firmly supports all efforts made by the Chinese government to achieve national reunification, and firmly supports China's position on issues related to Hong Kong, Xinjiang, and Tibet."	
Niger	Details Niger joined a joint statement of African countries in September 2024 which reaffirms "its firm commitment to the one-China principle, and reaffirms that there is but one China in the world, Taiwan is an inalienable part of China's territory and the Government of the People's Republic of China is the sole legal government representing the whole of China, and firmly supports all efforts by the Chinese government to achieve national reunification."	
Nigeria	Details Nigeria joined a joint statement of African countries in September 2024 which reaffirms "its firm commitment to the one-China principle, and reaffirms that there is but one China in the world, Taiwan is an inalienable part of China's territory and the Government of the People's Republic of China is the sole legal government representing the whole of China, and firmly supports all efforts by the Chinese government to achieve national reunification."	
North Korea	Details Official position of the North Korean government: "The Democratic People's Republic of Korea will fully support any measure of the People's Republic of China to defend the sovereignty and territorial integrity of the country and achieve the sacred cause of the unification of the Chinese nation." According to the North Korean ambassador to China in August 2023: "As already specified, resolution 2758 of the UN General Assembly adopted in October 1971 made it clear that Taiwan is an inseparable part of the People's Republic of China. ... The Democratic People's Republic of Korea ... strongly supports all the measures taken by China to achieve the national reunification on the principle of one China. Taiwan is a part of China forever and there will always be one China on the land of the Chinese nation."	
North Macedonia	Details Official position of the December 2007 joint statement: "Malaysia reiterates its firm adherence to the one-China policy, recognizes that there is only one China in the world, that the Government of the People's Republic of China is the sole legal government representing the whole of China, and that Taiwan is an inseparable part of China's territory. Malaysia confirms that it will not establish any form of official relations or conduct official exchanges with Taiwan, opposes Taiwan's accession to international organizations that only sovereign states can participate in, opposes any form of 'Taiwan independence' separatist activities, including 'referendums on UN membership,' and respects and supports China's efforts to achieve national reunification." According to the North Macedonian government in October 2023: "We fully respect the territorial integrity of the People's Republic of China and back the 'one China' policy."	
Oman	Details According to the May 2018 joint statement: "The Sultanate of Oman reaffirms its firm commitment of One China Principle and that Taiwan is an integral part of the Chinese territories. It supports the Chinese government stance towards Taiwan issue and the issues related to Chenggang and Tibet, as well as the Southern Sea of China."	
Pakistan	Details According to the October 2024 joint statement: "Both sides stressed that the authority of the U.N. General Assembly Resolution 2758 brooks no question or challenge. The Pakistani side reaffirmed its firm commitment to one-China principle, and reiterated that Taiwan is an inalienable part of the territory of the People's Republic of China, and that Pakistan firmly supports all efforts made by China to achieve national reunification, firmly opposes any form of 'Taiwan independence,' and will firmly support China on issues concerning Xinjiang, Xizang, Hong Kong and the South China Sea."	
Palestine	Details According to the June 2023 joint statement: "Palestine firmly adheres to the one-China principle, supports China in safeguarding its national sovereignty, unity and territorial integrity, and resolutely opposes any interference in China's internal affairs; it reiterates that the government of the People's Republic of China is the sole legal government representing the whole of China, that Taiwan is an inseparable part of China's territory, and resolutely opposes any form of "Taiwan independence," reiterating its opposition to any form of official exchanges with Taiwan, and supporting all efforts made by the Chinese government to achieve national reunification."	
Panama	Details According to the June 2017 joint statement: "The Government of the Republic of Panama recognizes that there is only one China in the world, the Government of the People's Republic of China is the only legitimate government representing all of China, and Taiwan is an inalienable part of Chinese territory. The Government of the Republic of Panama hereby severs its diplomatic relations with Taiwan and undertakes to cease all official relations or contact with Taiwan. The Government of the People's Republic of China expresses its appreciation for the aforementioned position of the Government of the Republic of Panama." According to the November 2017 joint statement: "Both sides agreed that upholding the one-China principle is a broad consensus of the international community and the fundamental premise and political foundation for the establishment and development of relations between China and Panama. The Panamanian government will strictly adhere to the one-China principle, resolutely oppose any actions that violate this principle, and actively support China's peaceful reunification process."	
Papua New Guinea	Details According to the October 2023 joint statement: "Papua New Guinea reaffirms ... that the government of the People's Republic of China is the sole legal government representing the whole of China and Taiwan is an inalienable part of China's territory, that it opposes 'Taiwan independence,' and that it supports all efforts made by the Government of the People's Republic of China to realize reunification."	
Peru	Details According to the November 2024 joint statement: "Peru reiterates its firm adherence to the one-China principle." According to correspondence by Lowy Institute to a Peruvian official: "Peru recognizes la 'Principe' of 'One China' since we signed the Declaration in 1971 establishing diplomatic relationships with the PRC. Since then, all Peruvian governments have followed the same position, which means Beijing is the only Government of all China and Taiwan is part of the PRC."	
Philippines	Details According to the June 1975 joint statement: "The Government of the Philippines recognizes the Government of the People's Republic of China as the sole legal government of China, fully understands and respects the Chinese government's position that there is only one China and that Taiwan is an inseparable part of Chinese territory, and decides to withdraw all official representative offices from Taiwan within one month from the date of signing this communiqué." According to President Bongbong Marcos in January 2024: "The One China policy remains in place. We have adhered to the One China policy strictly and conscientiously since we adopted the one China policy. And that has not changed. That will not change. We are not endorsing Taiwanese' independence. Taiwan is a province of China but the manner in which they will be brought together again is an internal matter."	
Poland	Details According to the November 1997 joint statement: "The Republic of Poland reiterates that it recognizes there is only one China in the world, namely the People's Republic of China, that Taiwan is an inseparable part of China's territory, and that the Government of the People's Republic of China is the sole legal government representing all the Chinese people." According to the June 2016 joint statement: "Poland supports the peaceful development of cross-strait relations and reiterates its adherence to the one-China policy."	
Portugal	Details According to the February 1979 joint statement: "The Government of the Portuguese Republic recognizes the Government of the People's Republic of China as the sole legal government of China, and Taiwan as an inseparable part of the People's Republic of China. The Government of the Portuguese Republic declares that it has severed diplomatic relations with Taiwan since January 1975." According to the December 2018 joint statement: "Portugal reiterates its adherence to the one-China principle and supports China's position on the Taiwan issue."	
Qatar	Details Qatar follows the "One China" policy and recognizes Taiwan as an inseparable part of China's territory.	
Romania	Details According to the September 1997 joint statement: "Romania reiterates that it recognizes there is only one China in the world, that Taiwan is an inseparable part of China, and that the government of the People's Republic of China is the sole legal government representing all the Chinese people." According to the November 2013 joint statement: "Romanian party will continue as before to apply firmly the one China policy and to support China's reunification cause. The Chinese party attaches high appreciation of this fact."	
Russia	Details According to the February 2022 joint statement: "The Russian side reaffirms its support for the One-China principle, confirms that Taiwan is an inalienable part of China, and opposes any forms of independence of Taiwan" According to the August 2024 joint statement: "Russia reiterates its adherence to the one-China principle, recognizes that there is only one China in the world, that Taiwan is an inseparable part of China's territory, and that the government of the People's Republic of China is the sole legal government representing the whole of China. Russia firmly opposes any form of 'Taiwan independence' and firmly supports China in safeguarding its sovereignty and territorial integrity and achieving national reunification."	
Rwanda	Details Rwanda joined a joint statement of African countries in September 2024 which reaffirms "its firm commitment to the one-China principle, and reaffirms that there is but one China in the world, Taiwan is an inalienable part of China's territory and the Government of the People's Republic of China is the sole legal government representing the whole of China, and firmly supports all efforts by the Chinese government to achieve national reunification."	
Samoa	Details According to the November 2024 joint statement: "Samoa firmly adheres to the one-China principle, and recognizes there is but one China in the world and Taiwan is an inalienable part of China's territory; the government of the People's Republic of China is the sole legal government representing the whole of China. Furthermore, Samoa recognizes efforts by the Chinese government to realize national reunification, and that issues relating to Hong Kong, Xinjiang, Xizang and human rights are internal matters for China to deal with."	
São Tomé and Príncipe	Details São Tomé and Príncipe joined a joint statement of African countries in September 2024 which reaffirms "its firm commitment to the one-China principle, and reaffirms that there is but one China in the world, Taiwan is an inalienable part of China's territory and the Government of the People's Republic of China is the sole legal government representing the whole of China, and firmly supports all efforts by the Chinese government to achieve national reunification."	
Saudi Arabia	Details According to the November 1999 joint statement: "Saudi Arabia emphasizes the principles of the Memorandum of Understanding and Joint Communiqué on the Establishment of Diplomatic Relations between the Kingdom of Saudi Arabia and the People's Republic of China, and reiterates that the Government of the People's Republic of China is the sole legal government representing all the Chinese people, and that Taiwan is an inseparable part of China's territory. China expresses its appreciation for this."	
Senegal	Details Senegal joined a joint statement of African countries in September 2024 which reaffirms "its firm commitment to the one-China principle, and reaffirms that there is but one China in the world, Taiwan is an inalienable part of China's territory and the Government of the People's Republic of China is the sole legal government representing the whole of China, and firmly supports all efforts by the Chinese government to achieve national reunification."	
Serbia	Details According to the May 2024 joint statement: "China in the world and that Taiwan is an inalienable part of China's territory, as well as that the Government of the People's Republic of China is the only legitimate government representing all of China. The Serbian side opposes all forms of 'Taiwan independence' and interference in China's internal affairs, stressing again that it will not engage in official contacts with the authorities of Taiwan in any way, and that it firmly supports all the efforts made by the Chinese Government in order to unify the country." In May 2024, Serbian President Aleksandar Vučić said "We have a clear and simple position regarding Chinese territorial integrity. Yes, Taiwan is China."	
Seychelles	Details Seychelles joined a joint statement of African countries in September 2024 which reaffirms "its firm commitment to the one-China principle, and reaffirms that there is but one China in the world, Taiwan is an inalienable part of China's territory and the Government of the People's Republic of China is the sole legal government representing the whole of China, and firmly supports all efforts by the Chinese government to achieve national reunification."	
Sierra Leone	Details Sierra Leone joined a joint statement of African countries in September 2024 which reaffirms "its firm commitment to the one-China principle, and reaffirms that there is but one China in the world, Taiwan is an inalienable part of China's territory and the Government of the People's Republic of China is the sole legal government representing the whole of China, and firmly supports all efforts by the Chinese government to achieve national reunification."	
Singapore	Details According to the October 2000 joint statement: "Singapore recognizes that there is only one China and that Taiwan is part of China. The Government of the Republic of Singapore recognizes the Government of the People's Republic of China."	
Slovakia	Details According to the January 2003 joint statement: "Slovakia reiterates that there is only one China in the world, the Government of the People's Republic of China is the sole legal government representing China, and Taiwan is an inseparable part of China." According to the November 2024 joint statement: "Slovakia reaffirmed its firm commitment to the one-China policy, that there is but one China in the world, and that the Government of the People's Republic of China is the sole legal government representing the whole of China. Slovakia opposes any attempts to interfere in China's internal affairs, sovereignty and territorial integrity, including Taiwan."	
Slovenia	Details According to the October 1996 joint statement: "Slovenia reiterates its commitment to the 'One China' principle, recognizing that there is only one China in the world, that Taiwan is an inseparable part of China, and that the Government of the People's Republic of China is the sole legal government representing all the Chinese people. The Republic of Slovenia's position of not engaging in any official exchanges or establishing any official relations with Taiwan remains unchanged." According to the Slovenian government in April 2024: "Ministers Fajon and Yi also discussed the situation in the Taiwan Strait, with Minister Fajon recalling that Slovenia follows the One China policy and is closely monitoring the situation in Taiwan".	
Solomon Islands	Details According to the June 2024 joint statement: "Solomon Islands is firmly committed to the one-China principle, and recognizes that there is but one China in the world, that Taiwan is an inalienable part of China's territory, and that the government of the People's Republic of China is the sole legal government representing the whole of China. Solomon Islands firmly opposes 'Taiwan independence' in any form, firmly supports all efforts by the Chinese government to realize national reunification, and firmly supports China on issues related to Taiwan, Hong Kong, Xinjiang, Xizang, human rights, etc."	
Somalia	Details Somalia joined a joint statement of African countries in September 2024 which reaffirms "its firm commitment to the one-China principle, and reaffirms that there is but one China in the world, Taiwan is an inalienable part of China's territory and the Government of the People's Republic of China is the sole legal government representing the whole of China, and firmly supports all efforts by the Chinese government to achieve national reunification."	
South Africa	Details South Africa joined a joint statement of African countries in September 2024 which reaffirms "its firm commitment to the one-China principle, and reaffirms that there is but one China in the world, Taiwan is an inalienable part of China's territory and the Government of the People's Republic of China is the sole legal government representing the whole of China, and firmly supports all efforts by the Chinese government to achieve national reunification."	
South Sudan	Details South Sudan joined a joint statement of African countries in September 2024 which reaffirms "its firm commitment to the one-China principle, and reaffirms that there is but one China in the world, Taiwan is an inalienable part of China's territory and the Government of the People's Republic of China is the sole legal government representing the whole of China, and firmly supports all efforts by the Chinese government to achieve national reunification."	
Spain	Details According to the Spanish government: "Spain is committed to the 'One China' policy and therefore does not maintain diplomatic relations with Taiwan."	
Sri Lanka	Details According to the October 2023 joint statement: "Sri Lanka reaffirmed its commitment to the one-China principle, recognizing that the government of the People's Republic of China is the sole legal government representing the whole of China and Taiwan is an inalienable part of China's territory, and reiterated that it supports the efforts by the Chinese Government to safeguard its sovereignty and territorial integrity, and opposes any form of 'Taiwan independence'."	
Sudan	Details Sudan joined a joint statement of African countries in September 2024 which reaffirms "its firm commitment to the one-China principle, and reaffirms that there is but one China in the world, Taiwan is an inalienable part of China's territory and the Government of the People's Republic of China is the sole legal government representing the whole of China, and firmly supports all efforts by the Chinese government to achieve national reunification."	
Suriname	Details According to the November 2019 joint statement: "Both sides unanimously maintain that upholding the one-China principle is a universal consensus of the international community and the fundamental premise and political foundation for the establishment and development of relations between China and Suriname. The Surinamese government reiterates that the Government of the People's Republic of China is the sole legal government representing the whole of China, and that Taiwan is an inseparable part of China's territory. Suriname supports the peaceful development of cross-strait relations and the efforts made by the Chinese government to achieve the peaceful reunification of the country." According to the April 2024 joint statement: "Suriname firmly adheres to the one-China principle, opposes any form of 'Taiwan independence,' emphasizes that the government of the People's Republic of China is the sole legal government representing the whole of China, and supports the efforts made by the Chinese government to achieve national reunification."	
Syria	Details According to the September 2023 joint statement: "Syria firmly adheres to the one-China principle, recognizes the government of the People's Republic of China as the sole legal government representing the whole of China, and acknowledges that Taiwan is an inseparable part of China. Syria supports China in safeguarding its national sovereignty, unity, and territorial integrity, resolutely opposes any interference in China's internal affairs, and supports all efforts made by the Chinese government to achieve national reunification." The Syrian transitional government kept Syria's position of recognizing People's Republic of China as the sole legitimate government representing China, including Taiwan.	
Tajikistan	Details According to the May 2023 joint statement: "Tajikistan firmly adheres to the one-China principle, reiterates that the Government of the People's Republic of China is the sole legal government representing the whole of China, and that Taiwan is an inseparable part of China's territory. Tajikistan resolutely opposes any form of 'Taiwan independence,' reiterates its non-official exchanges with Taiwan, and supports all efforts made by the Chinese government to achieve national reunification."	
Tanzania	Details Tanzania joined a joint statement of African countries in September 2024 which reaffirms "its firm commitment to the one-China principle, and reaffirms that there is but one China in the world, Taiwan is an inalienable part of China's territory and the Government of the People's Republic of China is the sole legal government representing the whole of China, and firmly supports all efforts by the Chinese government to achieve national reunification."	
Thailand	Details According to the January 2025 joint statement: "Thailand firmly upholds the One-China Policy, recognising the Government of the People's Republic of China as the sole legal government representing the whole of China and Taiwan as an inalienable part of China, and will not support any call for the independence of Taiwan. Thailand also supports China's "One Country, Two Systems" policy."	
Timor-Leste	Details According to the July 2024 joint statement: "Both sides stressed that the authority of UN General Assembly Resolution 2758 brooks no dispute. Timor-Leste reiterated its firm unequivocal adherence to the one-China principle, recognized that there is but one China in the world, and that the government of the People's Republic of China is the sole lawful government representing the whole of China, and Taiwan is an inalienable part of the Chinese territory. Timor-Leste is opposed to any form of 'Taiwan independence,' will not establish any form of diplomatic relationship or conduct any form of official contacts with Taiwan, and supports all the efforts of the Chinese government to realize national reunification."	
Togo	Details Togo joined a joint statement of African countries in September 2024 which reaffirms "its firm commitment to the one-China principle, and reaffirms that there is but one China in the world, Taiwan is an inalienable part of China's territory and the Government of the People's Republic of China is the sole legal government representing the whole of China, and firmly supports all efforts by the Chinese government to achieve national reunification."	
Trinidad and Tobago	Details Trinidad and Tobago adheres to the one-China policy. In 2000, Minister of National Security Joseph Theodore stated that the Trinidad and Tobago government "sticks to the one-China principle and supports China's reunification".	
Tunisia	Details Tunisia joined a joint statement of African countries in September 2024 which reaffirms "its firm commitment to the one-China principle, and reaffirms that there is but one China in the world, Taiwan is an inalienable part of China's territory and the Government of the People's Republic of China is the sole legal government representing the whole of China, and firmly supports all efforts by the Chinese government to achieve national reunification."	
Türkiye	Details According to a June 2009 statement: "China appreciated Turkey's adherence to the one-China policy and its support to China on the issues of Taiwan and Tibet, the president noted." According to Reuters, Turkish Foreign Minister Hakan Fidan reiterated Turkey's "One China" policy regarding Taiwan during a visit to China in June 2024.	
Turkmenistan	Details According to the January 2023 joint statement: "Turkmenistan reiterated that the Government of the People's Republic of China is the sole legal government representing the whole of China, and that Taiwan is an inseparable part of China's territory. Turkmenistan firmly adheres to the one-China principle, resolutely opposes any form of 'Taiwan independence,' supports the peaceful development of cross-strait relations and all efforts made by the Chinese government to achieve national reunification, and that both sides will cooperate closely and will never allow any forces to interfere in the internal affairs of either country."	
Uganda	Details Uganda joined a joint statement of African countries in September 2024 which reaffirms "its firm commitment to the one-China principle, and reaffirms that there is but one China in the world, Taiwan is an inalienable part of China's territory and the Government of the People's Republic of China is the sole legal government representing the whole of China, and firmly supports all efforts by the Chinese government to achieve national reunification."	
Ukraine	Details According to the December 2013 joint statement: "Ukraine reiterated its firm adherence to the one-China policy, recognized the government of the People's Republic of China as the sole legal government representing the whole of China, and affirmed that Taiwan is an inseparable part of China's territory. Ukraine opposed any form of "Taiwan independence" and supported the peaceful development of cross-strait relations and the cause of China's peaceful reunification."	
United Arab Emirates	Details According to the May 2024 joint statement: "The UAE side stressed that it continues to firmly adhere to the One-China Principle and that Taiwan is an integral part of China, supports the Chinese side's position on issues related to China's sovereignty and territorial integrity, supports the achievement of Chinese reunification, and rejects external interference in internal Chinese affairs."	
Uruguay	Details According to the November 2023 joint statement: "Uruguay reaffirmed its adherence to the one-China principle, recognized the government of the People's Republic of China as the sole legal government representing the whole of China, and affirmed that Taiwan is an inseparable part of Chinese territory. Uruguay also supported the Chinese government's efforts to achieve national reunification."	
Uzbekistan	Details According to the May 2023 joint statement: "Uzbekistan firmly supports the one-China principle, reiterates that the Government of the People's Republic of China is the sole legal government representing the whole of China, and that Taiwan is an inseparable part of China's territory. Uzbekistan reiterates its non-official exchanges with Taiwan in any form and firmly supports the peaceful development of cross-strait relations and all efforts made by the Chinese government to achieve national reunification."	
Vanuatu	Details According to the July 2024 joint statement: "Vanuatu firmly adheres to the one-China principle, and recognizes that there is but one China in the world, that Taiwan is an inalienable part of China's territory, and that the government of the People's Republic of China is the sole legal government representing the whole of China. Vanuatu firmly supports efforts by the Chinese government to realize national reunification, opposing 'Taiwan independence', and firmly recognises that issues relating to Hong Kong, Xinjiang, Xizang and human rights are internal matters for China to deal with."	
Venezuela	Details According to the September 2023 joint statement: "Venezuela reiterated its firm commitment to the one-China principle, recognizing the government of the People's Republic of China as the sole legal government representing the whole of China, and affirming that Taiwan is an inseparable part of China's territory. Venezuela also expressed its firm support for all efforts made by the Chinese government to achieve national reunification."	
Vietnam	Details According to the October 2024 joint statement: "Vietnam reiterated its firm adherence to the one-China policy, acknowledging that there is only one China in the world, that Taiwan is an inseparable part of China's territory, that the government of the People's Republic of China is the sole legal government representing the whole of China, that Vietnam supports the peaceful development of cross-strait relations and the cause of China's reunification, and resolutely opposes any form of 'Taiwan independence' separatist activities, and will not develop any form of official relations with Taiwan." Vietnam follows the "One China" policy and recognizes Taiwan as an inseparable part of China's territory.	
Yemen	Details Yemen follows the "One China" policy and recognizes Taiwan as an inseparable part of China's territory.	
Zambia	Details Zambia joined a joint statement of African countries in September 2024 which reaffirms "its firm commitment to the one-China principle, and reaffirms that there is but one China in the world, Taiwan is an inalienable part of China's territory and the Government of the People's Republic of China is the sole legal government representing the whole of China, and firmly supports all efforts by the Chinese government to achieve national reunification."	
Zimbabwe	Details Zimbabwe joined a joint statement of African countries in September 2024 which reaffirms "its firm commitment to the one-China principle, and reaffirms that there is but one China in the world, Taiwan is an inalienable part of China's territory and the Government of the People's Republic of China is the sole legal government representing the whole of China, and firmly supports all efforts by the Chinese government to achieve national reunification."	

=== Countries that have no position ===
- Abkhazia
- Kosovo (ROC recognizes its independence)
- Northern Cyprus
- Somaliland (ROC has unofficial relations)
- South Ossetia
- Sovereign Order of Malta
- Transnistria

== International organizations ==
Under continuing pressure from the PRC to bar any representation of the ROC that may imply statehood, international organizations have adopted different policies toward the issue of ROC's participation. In cases where almost all UN members or sovereign states participate, such as the World Health Organization, the ROC has been shut out. In others, it participates under other names, including Chinese Taipei (in the International Olympic Committee or APEC) and the "Separate Customs Territory of Taiwan, Penghu, Kimmen and Matsu" (in the World Trade Organization, and often also shortened as "Chinese Taipei"). After nine years of negotiations, members of the WTO completed the conditions on which to allow Taiwan admittance into the multilateral trade organization. At the end of 2011, Jeffery Bader, Assistant United States Trade Representative for China, Taiwan, Hong Kong, and Macau, led and finalized the final stages of Taiwan's accession to the WTO, which were approved by trade ministers in November in Doha, Qatar. The ISO 3166 directory of names of countries and territories registers Taiwan (TW) separately from and in addition to the People's Republic of China (CN), but lists Taiwan as "Taiwan, Province of China" based on the name used by the UN under PRC pressure. In ISO 3166-2:CN, Taiwan is also coded CN-71 under China, thus making Taiwan part of China in ISO 3166-1 and ISO 3166-2 categories.

Naming issues surrounding Taiwan/ROC continue to be a contentious issue in non-governmental organizations such as the Lions Club, which faced considerable controversy naming its Taiwanese branch.

== See also ==
- Politics of Taiwan
- History of Taiwan
- Exclusive mandate
- Right to exist
- Chinese legitimacy question
- Foreign relations of Taiwan
- Foreign relations of the People's Republic of China (1949–present)
- Dates of establishment of diplomatic relations with the People's Republic of China

== Notes ==
1. Until 2018 called Swaziland.
2. Established relations with the PRC on 8 September 1997, but restored ties with the ROC on 26 April 2007.
3. As of 2026, the majority of UN member states continue to recognize the deposed Islamic Republic of Afghanistan, which recognized the PRC without supporting its One China Policy, as the internationally recognized government of Afghanistan as opposed to the Taliban-led Islamic Emirate of Afghanistan, which supports the One China Policy and is currently recognized by only one UN member state, Russia.
