= List of diplomatic missions in the United Arab Emirates =

This is a list of diplomatic missions in the United Arab Emirates. There are currently 151 embassies in Abu Dhabi. Many other countries have diplomatic missions accredited from other capitals.

Honorary consulates are excluded from this listing.

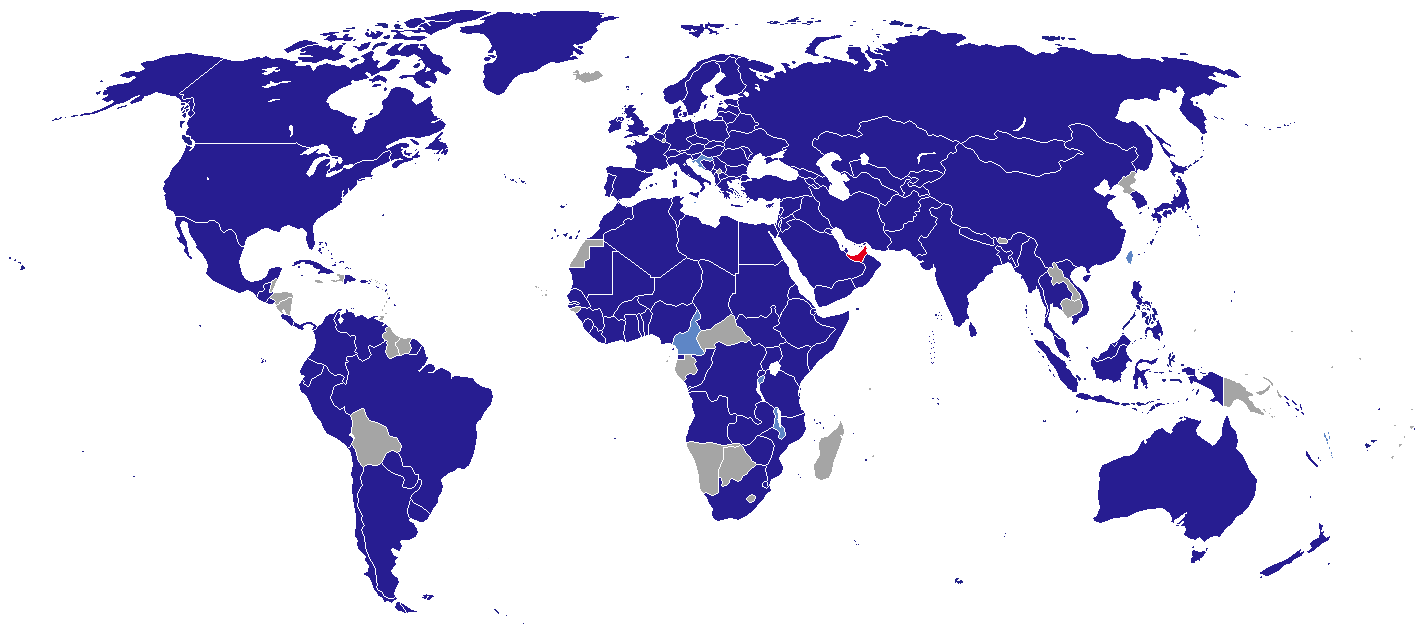
Diplomatic missions in the UAE UAE Countries with embassies in Abu Dhabi Countries with consulates-general in Dubai only

== Diplomatic missions in Abu Dhabi ==
=== Embassies ===
1. Afghanistan
2. Albania
3. Angola
4. Antigua and Barbuda
5. Argentina
6. Armenia
7. Australia
8. Austria
9. Azerbaijan
10. Bahamas
11. Bahrain
12. Bangladesh
13. Barbados
14. Belarus
15. Belgium
16. Bosnia and Herzegovina
17. Brazil
18. Brunei
19. Bulgaria
20. Burkina Faso
21. Canada
22. Chad
23. Chile
24. China
25. Colombia
26. Comoros
27. Congo-Kinshasa
28. Costa Rica
29. Cuba
30. Cyprus
31. Czechia
32. Denmark
33. Djibouti
34. Dominica
35. Dominican Republic
36. Ecuador
37. Egypt
38. El Salvador
39. Equatorial Guinea
40. Eritrea
41. Estonia
42. Eswatini
43. Ethiopia
44. Fiji
45. Finland
46. France
47. Gabon
48. Gambia
49. Georgia
50. Germany
51. Ghana
52. Greece
53. Guatemala
54. Guinea
55. Haiti
56. Holy See
57. Hungary
58. India
59. Indonesia
60. Iran
61. Iraq
62. Ireland
63. Israel
64. Italy
65. Ivory Coast
66. Japan
67. Jordan
68. Kazakhstan
69. Kenya
70. Kosovo
71. Kuwait
72. Kyrgyzstan
73. Latvia
74. Lebanon
75. Liberia
76. Libya
77. Lithuania
78. Luxembourg
79. Malaysia
80. Maldives
81. Mali
82. Malta
83. Marshall Islands
84. Mauritania
85. Mexico
86. Moldova
87. Mongolia
88. Montenegro
89. Morocco
90. Mozambique
91. Myanmar
92. Nepal
93. Netherlands
94. New Zealand
95. Niger
96. Nigeria
97. North Macedonia
98. Norway
99. Oman
100. Pakistan
101. Palestine
102. Panama
103. Paraguay
104. Peru
105. Philippines
106. Poland
107. Portugal
108. Qatar
109. Romania
110. Russia
111. Rwanda
112. Saint Kitts and Nevis
113. Saudi Arabia
114. Senegal
115. Serbia
116. Seychelles
117. Sierra Leone
118. Singapore
119. Slovakia
120. Slovenia
121. Solomon Islands
122. Somalia
123. South Africa
124. South Korea
125. South Sudan
126. Spain
127. Sri Lanka
128. Sweden
129. Switzerland
130. Syria
131. Tajikistan
132. Tanzania
133. Thailand
134. Timor-Leste
135. Togo
136. Tonga
137. Tunisia
138. Turkey
139. Turkmenistan
140. Tuvalu
141. Uganda
142. Ukraine
143. United Kingdom
144. United States
145. Uruguay
146. Uzbekistan
147. Venezuela
148. Vietnam
149. Yemen
150. Zambia
151. Zimbabwe

=== Other missions or delegations ===
1. European Union (Delegation)
2. Northern Cyprus (Representative Office)
3. Somaliland (Representative office)

== Missions in Dubai ==
1. Afghanistan
2. Angola
3. Armenia
4. Australia
5. Azerbaijan
6. Bahrain
7. Bangladesh
8. Belarus
9. Bulgaria
10. Burundi
11. Cameroon
12. Canada
13. Catalonia (Trade & Investment office)
14. Chad
15. Chile (Commercial office)
16. China
17. Comoros
18. Cote D'Ivoire
19. Croatia
20. Denmark
21. Djibouti
22. Egypt
23. Equatorial Guinea
24. Eritrea
25. Ethiopia
26. Fiji
27. France
28. Germany
29. Ghana
30. Greece (Economic & Commercial Affairs Office)
31. Grenada
32. Hong Kong (Economic & Trade office)
33. India
34. Indonesia
35. Iran
36. Iraq
37. Ireland (Trade office)
38. Israel
39. Italy
40. Japan
41. Jordan
42. Kazakhstan
43. Kenya
44. Kuwait
45. Kyrgyzstan
46. Lebanon
47. Liberia
48. Libya
49. Malawi
50. Malaysia
51. Malta
52. Mauritius
53. Morocco
54. Mozambique
55. Myanmar
56. Nepal
57. Netherlands
58. New Zealand
59. Niger
60. Nigeria
61. Norway
62. Pakistan
63. Palestine
64. Panama
65. Peru
66. Philippines
67. Portugal (Trade Center)
68. Qatar
69. Republic of China (Taiwan) (Commercial Office)
70. Romania
71. Russia
72. Rwanda
73. Saudi Arabia
74. Singapore
75. Somalia
76. South Africa
77. South Korea
78. South Sudan
79. Spain (Economic & Commercial office)
80. Sri Lanka
81. Switzerland
82. Syria
83. Tajikistan
84. Tanzania
85. Thailand
86. Tunisia
87. Turkey
88. Turkmenistan
89. Uganda
90. Ukraine
91. United Kingdom (Embassy)
92. United States
93. Uzbekistan
94. Vanuatu
95. Yemen
96. Zimbabwe

== Non-resident embassies ==
Resident in Cairo, Egypt

- Bolivia
- Burundi
- Croatia
- Honduras
- Namibia

Resident in Doha, Qatar

- Central African Republic

Resident in Kuwait City, Kuwait

- Bhutan
- Botswana
- Cambodia
- Guyana
- Honduras
- Laos
- Lesotho
- Malawi
- Nicaragua

Resident in New Delhi, India

- Iceland
- Jamaica
- Nauru
- Trinidad and Tobago

Resident in Rabat, Morocco

- Cape Verde
- Grenada
- Saint Lucia
- Saint Vincent and the Grenadines
- Suriname

Resident in Riyadh, Saudi Arabia

- Cameroon
- Guinea Bissau
- Madagascar
- Mauritius

== Embassies to open ==
Host city	Sending country	Mission	Ref.
Abu Dhabi	Bolivia	Embassy	
Abu Dhabi	Croatia	Embassy	
Abu Dhabi	Guyana	Embassy	
Abu Dhabi	Lesotho	Embassy	
Abu Dhabi	Madagascar	Embassy	
Abu Dhabi	Malawi	Embassy	
Abu Dhabi	Namibia	Embassy	
Abu Dhabi	Palau	Embassy	
Abu Dhabi	Papua New Guinea	Embassy	
Abu Dhabi	Saint Vincent and the Grenadines	Diplomatic mission	

== Former missions ==
Host City	Country	Mission	Year closed	Ref.
Abu Dhabi	Algeria	Embassy	2026	
Abu Dhabi	Belize	Embassy	2022	
Abu Dhabi	Benin	Embassy	Unknown	
Abu Dhabi	Sudan	Embassy	2025	
Dubai	Algeria	Consulate General	2026	
Dubai	Sudan	Consulate General	2025	

== See also ==
- Foreign relations of the United Arab Emirates
- List of diplomatic missions of the United Arab Emirates
- Visa requirements for United Arab Emirates citizens
