= Taiwan–United Arab Emirates relations =

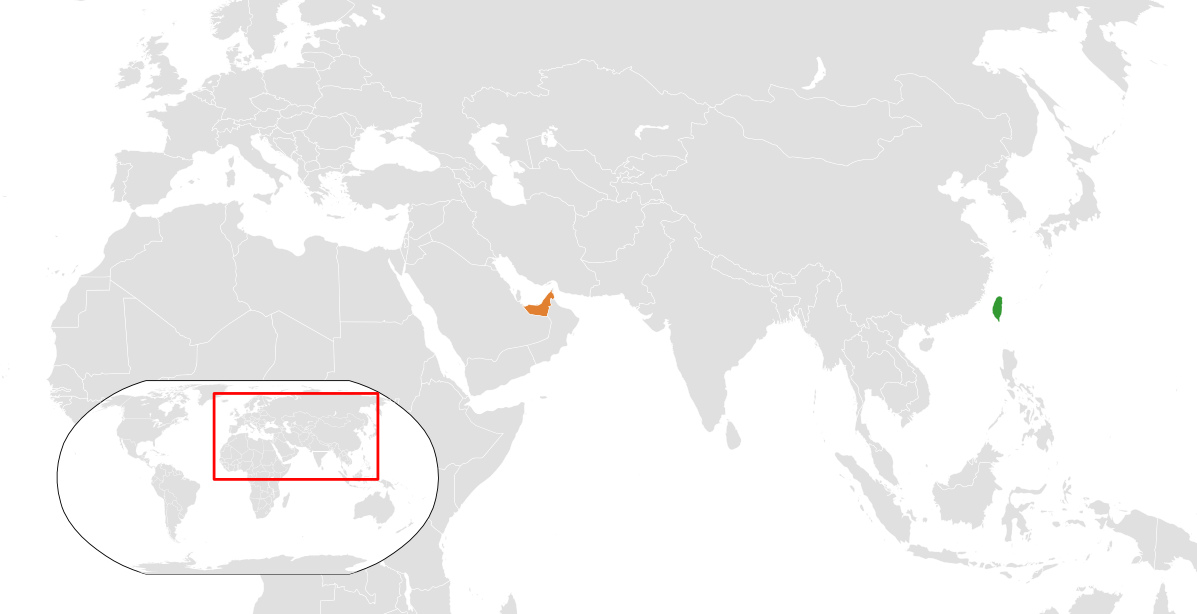

- Taiwan: United Arab Emirates

Taiwan–United Arab Emirates relations are relations between the United Arab Emirates (UAE) and Taiwan (formally known as the Republic of China)

== History ==
In May 1979, the Ministry of Foreign Affairs of Republic of China established an honorary consulate in Dubai, the largest city in the United Arab Emirates. In July 1980, it was upgraded to the honorary consulate general. In May 1988, it was renamed to Commercial Office of the Republic of China to Dubai, making it one of the few Taiwanese missions that used the name 'Republic of China' in countries which adhere to the one-China policy. On 14 June 2017, due to diplomatic pressure from the People's Republic of China, the Ministry of Foreign Affairs of the Republic of China changed the name of the office to The Commercial Office of Taipei, Dubai, U.A.E.

Taiwan began importing oil from the UAE in 1984.

Taiwanese President Chen Shui-bian visited the UAE in 2004. Chen's visit included a number of gifts for the UAE including 10,000 T91 assault rifles.

Ahmed bin Saeed Al Maktoum visited Taiwan in 2014 and was received by Taiwanese President Ma Ying-jeou.

In 2019 a ship under charter by CPC Corporation carrying naptha from the United Arab Emirates to Taiwan was attacked in the Gulf of Oman close to Iran's coast.

In 2022 the UAE made statements that were seen as backing China's stance on Taiwan issues.

Taiwan and the UAE have overlapping interests in Somaliland.

During the American Biden and second Trump administrations the UAE engaged in negotiations with the US and TSMC over the latter's building of megafabs in the UAE.

== See also ==
- China–United Arab Emirates relations
- Somaliland–United Arab Emirates relations
- Somaliland–Taiwan relations
