= Michael Baroody =

American lobbyist (1946–2026)

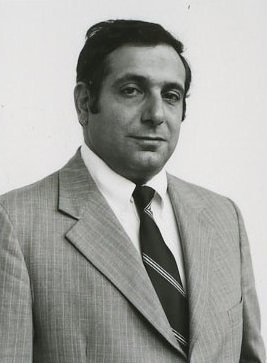
- Baroody in 1981

Personal details
- Born: September 14, 1946 Washington, D.C., U.S.
- Died: April 11, 2026 (aged 79)
- Education: University of Notre Dame

Michael Elias Baroody (September 14, 1946 – April 11, 2026) was an American lobbyist.

== Life and career ==
Baroody was born in Washington, D.C., and graduated from the University of Notre Dame (B.A., 1968). He served in the United States Navy from 1968 to 1970. In 1970 he began his career in the Washington office of Nebraska Senator Roman Hruska. From 1977 to 1980 he was research director and later director of public affairs at the Republican National Committee. In 1980 he served as Editor-in-Chief for Republican Platform.

From 1981 to 1985 Baroody served as Deputy Assistant to the President and Director of Public Affairs at the White House under Ronald Reagan. From 1985 to 1990 he was assistant secretary for policy at the United States Department of Labor during the Ronald Reagan and George H. W. Bush administrations.

From 1990 to 1993 he was senior vice president for policy and communications and later president of the Republican-oriented National Policy Forum. He also served as Bob Dole's Speechwriter and Executive Assistant. In 1994 he returned to the National Association of Manufacturers (NAM) to help build the Association's public affairs program, emphasizing greater involvement by NAM members in lobbying, policy and political activities inside and outside of Washington. These involvement activities grew into a "third branch" of NAM's advocacy efforts, co-equal with the traditional lobbying and media-relations "branches" in Policy and Communications. From 1997 to 2002 he was board member of the National Center for Neighborhood Enterprise.

From 1998, Baroody was a senior lobbyist for the National Association of Manufacturers, one of industry's most powerful lobbies. He oversaw all of the NAM's advocacy efforts and represented the NAM on the Executive Committee of BIPAC, the influential Business-Industry Political Action Committee. In March 2007 President George W. Bush raised controversy after nominating Baroody as the new chairman of the Consumer Product Safety Commission. Baroody withdrew his name from consideration on May 23.

Baroody died on April 11, 2026, at the age of 79.
