= Chinese legitimacy issue =

Debate on which polity represents China

Chinese legitimacy issue (Chinese: 中國代表權問題) is the issue of which government has political legitimacy to represent the nation of China: the People's Republic of China on mainland China or the Republic of China on Taiwan. The issue is closely tied to the ambiguous political status of Taiwan.

From 1911 to 1949, "China" was unambiguously represented globally by the Republic of China (ROC). On October 1, 1949, the People's Republic of China (PRC) was created by the communist victors of the Chinese Civil War with control over mainland China, with the ROC retreating to Taiwan. Both claim to be the only legitimate representative of "China".

In 1971, the United Nations General Assembly (UNGA) Resolution 2758 recognized the PRC as "the sole legal representative of China to the United Nations", replacing the ROC in the UN. Since then, most countries have recognized the PRC as "China", though many countries still maintain informal relations with the ROC.

Since the creation of the PRC, the political status of Taiwan has been in dispute. According to the PRC, the UN resolution's recognition of representation also extends to Taiwan, which is why the PRC believes it should be the legitimate representative. However, the ROC disputes this, and historically claimed to be the representative of China in line with its One China principle. However, the government has in recent years been more accepting of the Two Chinas reality based on the 1992 Consensus.

== History ==
Ever since the creation of the Republic of China following the 1911 Revolution, there have been numerous divisions within the government, most notably between the Nationalist government and Beiyang government. There was also the creation of the Chinese Soviet Republic that opposed the rule of the ROC.

By 1949, the communists had defeated the nationalists on mainland China in the Chinese Civil War. That same year, the communists founded the People's Republic of China, which claimed legitimate representation for "China", often with the help of the Soviet Union. The Republic of China retreated to Taiwan, and continued to claim legitimacy through its seat at the UN, often with the help of the United States. In the following years, as the number of states recognizing the PRC increased, more states also supported the PRC in gaining representation at the UN. The US once suggested the possibility for dual representation of both the PRC and the ROC at the UN, but received rejection from the PRC.

In 1971, the UN recognized the PRC as "China" in UNGA Resolution 2758. The next year, PRC-US meetings produced the Shanghai communique, in which the US "acknowledges that... there is but one China and that Taiwan is a part of China". This solidified the One China principle adhered to by both the PRC and ROC. The American declaration intentionally left unclear which China the "China" represents, signalling the US's continued policy of strategic ambiguity regarding the China issue.

Since losing its UN seat, the ROC position has been shifting from "One China" to "Two Chinas". Today, most call the ROC as "Taiwan", reflecting this change in attitude.

== Perspectives ==
=== PRC ===
The PRC considers itself the successor state of the ROC. It considers Taiwan to be a "renegade province", and the issue of legitimacy resolved by UNGA Resolution 2758.

=== ROC ===
During the Dang Guo (party-state) period from 1948 to 1991, the ROC considered the PRC, and its ruling Chinese Communist Party, to be rebels.

Today, the ROC typically sees itself as representing only Taiwan. It typically calls itself the "Republic of China" officially or "Taiwan" unofficially instead of "China".

== International community ==
The PRC dictates that any nation which wishes to form diplomatic relations with the PRC must follow its One China principle. This effectively means that any state must choose to recognize either the PRC or ROC, but not concurrently.

Besides the around a dozen states that recognize the ROC, all the other states in the world recognize the PRC and so, at least partially, adhere to its One China principle. On the political status of Taiwan, many states conduct a strategically ambiguous foreign policy. For example, Canada states that it "takes note of" the PRC's position, instead of using more direct words such as "recognizes".

=== US policy ===
The Three Communiques between the United States and People's Republic of China established the US's policy towards the PRC. At the same time, the US abides by its Taiwan Relations Act, which guarantees security of the status quo for the island of Taiwan.

On May 16, 2023, the US House of Representatives passed the Taiwan International Solidarity Act. This act emphasizes that Resolution 2758 merely addresses the legitimacy issue of China, but not Taiwan. Despite this, this Act has not passed the US Senate, making it ineffective prior to the enactment of the Act.

=== United Nations ===
The Republic of China is one of the founding members of the United Nations, and one of the original five permanent members of the UN Security Council. At the time of creation in 1945, the ROC still controlled mainland China as it fought against the CCP in the Chinese Civil War. However, the ROC retreated to Taiwan after losing the war in 1949, but continued to hold its seat at the UN. The People's Republic of China has since its proclamation demanded representation at the UN to replace the ROC, but failed numerous times.

On July 15, 1971, Albania led a delegation of 18 UN members to call for recognizing the PRC as the only legal representative of "China" in the UN.

During a period of intense debate in the UN from October 19 to 24, 1971, the representatives of more than 70 member states spoke about their views regarding the issue of the representation of China in the UN. Saudi Arabia, as an ally of the ROC, tried to prevent the complete expulsion of the ROC. Its representatives (Jamil Baroody) tried to propose a "dual-representation" resolution. If passed, this resolution would allow the PRC to gain the ROC's permanent seat at the security council, but would also allow the ROC to retain a regular member's seat at the general assembly. However, this resolution failed with 61 against, 51 in favor, and 16 abstentions.

On October 25, 1971, the UN General Assembly again voted on this issue through Resolution 2758, which officially recognized the People's Republic of China as "the only legitimate representative of China to the United Nations" and have decided to "expel forthwith the representatives of Chiang Kai-shek from the place".

In 2023, Polish scholars Antonina Łuszczykiewicz and Patrick Mendis published a journal article in The National Interest, which outlined their views supporting a greater role for Taiwan at the UN. The authors point out that Resolution 2758 only "recognizes the PRC as the 'only lawful representative of China.'" However, this resolution "does not authorize Beijing to represent Taiwan in the UN system" because "it does not state that Taiwan is part of the PRC".

=== International Olympic Committee ===
Ever since the passage of Resolution 2758, the PRC government have pressurized different international organizations to stop calling the ROC "China" or "Republic of China". In the 1976 Summer Olympics, the ROC was forced to enter under the name "Taiwan". The team later withdrew due to disagreements with this policy.

In 1979, the International Olympic Committee approved a decision, and the ROC will now have to enter the games under the title "Chinese Taipei". The PRC officially accepted this name under a separate agreement with the IOC two years later. Since then, the ROC has generally adopted this name when entering into Olympic games.

== See also ==
- Taiwanese independence movement
- Chinese unification
