= Commercial Office of Taipei, Dubai =

Overseas representative office of Taiwan

Commercial Office of Taipei, Dubai, U.A.E.
- 駐杜拜臺北商務辦事處

Agency overview
- Formed: July 1979 (as Honorary Consulate of the Republic of China in Dubai)
- Jurisdiction: United Arab Emirates; Eritrea; Iran; Somalia
- Headquarters: Sharaf Travel Building, Khalid Bin Al Waleed St., Umm Hurair 1, Bur Dubai, Dubai, United Arab Emirates
- Agency executive: Eric Chen (陳俊吉), Director General
- Website: The Commercial Office of Taipei, Dubai, U.A.E.

The Commercial Office of Taipei, Dubai, U.A.E. (Chinese: 駐杜拜臺北商務辦事處) represents the interests of Taiwan in the United Arab Emirates in the absence of formal diplomatic relations, functioning as a de facto consulate.

== Background ==
The aim of the representative office is to further bilateral cooperation between the United Arab Emirates and Taiwan in the fields of economics, culture, education and research. In addition, it offers consular services and the consular jurisdiction of the office also extends to Eritrea, Iran and Somalia.

In May 1979, the Ministry of Foreign Affairs of Republic of China established an honorary consulate in Dubai, the largest city in the United Arab Emirates. In July 1980, it was upgraded to the honorary consulate general. In May 1988, it was renamed to Commercial Office of the Republic of China to Dubai, making it one of the few Taiwanese missions that used the name 'Republic of China' in countries which adhere to the one-China policy. On 14 June 2017, due to diplomatic pressure from the People's Republic of China, the Ministry of Foreign Affairs of the Republic of China changed the name of the office to Commercial Office of Taipei, Dubai, U.A.E.

== See also ==
- List of diplomatic missions of Taiwan
- List of diplomatic missions in the United Arab Emirates
- Taiwan–United Arab Emirates relations
