= Jamil Baroody =

Saudi diplomat

His Excellency Jamil Baroody
- جميل بارودي
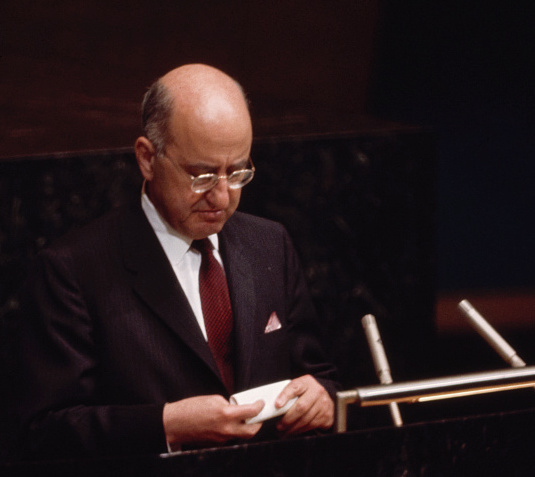
- Baroody at the United Nations

Permanent Representative of Saudi Arabia to the United Nations
- In office 1946–1979

Personal details
- Born: 1905 Souk El Gharb, Mount Lebanon Mutasarrifate, Ottoman Empire (now in Mount Lebanon Governorate, Lebanon)
- Died: 4 March 1979 (aged 73–74) New York City, United States
- Education: American University in Beirut

Jamil Baroody (Arabic: جميل بارودي; 1905 – March 4, 1979) was a Saudi diplomat who served as a representative to the United Nations from the organization's first meeting in 1946 until his death.

== Personal life ==
Baroody married an American woman and had four children who were educated in the United States.

== Early life, education, and early career ==
Baroody was born in Souk-el-Gharb, Lebanon in 1905. A Melkite Greek Catholic Church Christian, he studied at American University in Beirut and began his diplomatic career in 1929. He served as a delegate to the League of Nations. He taught at Princeton University during the Second World War and worked as a consultant for the Arabic version of Reader's Digest.

== Career at the United Nations ==
A friend of King Faisal of Saudi Arabia, Baroody was appointed Saudi representative to the United Nations at its founding and was given unusual power to shape Saudi positions there, a contrast to other representatives who mostly took orders from their Foreign Ministries. Baroody was known as a master of UN procedure and a colorful orator whose frankness, passion, and wit enlivened often dull debates. A profile in TIME Magazine humorously claimed that he might "be responsible for preventing untold numbers of colleagues from dying of sheer boredom," thanks to his original and eccentric speeches. In 1971 U.S. delegate Ed Derwinski said of Baroody: "The oratorical skill of the distinguished delegate is almost overpowering. I am convinced that if Mr. Winston Churchill in his heyday had debated Mr. Baroody, he would have come across second best." According to historian Roland Burke, one of Baroody's speeches on human rights was "a rhetorical vortex of references to the dinosaurs and their apparent demise by predation from the sabre-toothed tiger, digressions on the Sumerians, and on the dangers of psychiatry." According to another account, Baroody's interventions were "always wide-ranging, often entertaining; but he tended to speak at inconvenient times and at excessive length ... declaring awkward truths."

Baroody opposed the UN's 1948 Universal Declaration of Human Rights as an imposition of western civilization's values on the Islamic world. In his view its ideas concerning marriage and freedom of religion were colonialist attacks on 14 centuries of Islamic law. In particular the right to change one's religion he felt was incompatible with Islam, though the Pakistani delegate at the time thought differently. He also feared that human rights would make Saudi Arabia a target due to its continuing practice of slavery.

During the October 1971 UN debate on China’s representation, Baroody proposed a "two-China" compromise to prevent Republic of China (ROC) from being completely removed from the United Nations. His plan suggested that the People's Republic of China (PRC) would take the permanent Security Council seat, while Republic of China would keep a separate seat in the General Assembly under a name "Republic of Taiwan" until the two sides resolved their differences. However the idea did not gain enough support and was rejected by both ROC and PRC. On 25 October 1971, the UN passed Resolution 2758, which recognised the PRC as the sole representative of China and removed ROC from the organization.

Among the causes he defended throughout his career was Palestinian statehood. During a heated 1975 debate on Zionism, Baroody called Zionists "an alien people in our midst" and decried Jewish money and Jewish influence.

When he died, he was the longest-serving member of any member states. The United Nations Secretary General Kurt Waldheim ordered the UN flag in New York flown at half-mast, an honor usually reserved for heads of state.
