= William J. Baroody Sr. =

American political consultant

Personal details
- Born: January 29, 1916 Manchester, New Hampshire, U.S.
- Died: July 29, 1980 (aged 64) Alexandria, Virginia, U.S.
- Children: William J. Baroody Jr. (son)
- Education: Saint Anselm College

William Joseph Baroody Sr. (January 29, 1916 – July 29, 1980) was an American political figure. He was president of the American Enterprise Institute from 1962 to 1978. Baroody joined the American Enterprise Association in 1954 as executive vice president. Upon his retirement as president of the AEI he was succeeded by his son, William J. Baroody Jr., a former aide in the Ford White House.

== Early life and education ==
Born in Manchester, New Hampshire, to Lebanese immigrants of Melkite Greek Catholic descent, Baroody graduated from St. Anselm College in 1936, working odd jobs to help pay his way through school. As a layman, he was active in the Melkite Greek Catholic Church.

== Career ==
After finishing college he joined the New Hampshire Unemployment Compensation Agency. During World War II, he joined the New Hampshire War Finance Committee and then served in the US Navy as a lieutenant. After World War II, he was employed by the Veterans Administration. From 1950 to 1953, he was an official of the U.S. Chamber of Commerce.

During his career, Baroody championed conservative political and social views on many issues. He served as principal adviser of Barry Goldwater when the Arizona senator was the 1964 Republican Party presidential candidate. Baroody was also a friend and confidante to Richard Nixon, Gerald Ford, and other Republican politicians.

== Notes ==
Non-profit organization positions
Preceded by Allen D. Marshall	President of the American Enterprise Institute; 1962–1978	Succeeded by William J. Baroody Jr.
