= William J. Baroody Jr. =

American government official

William Baroody
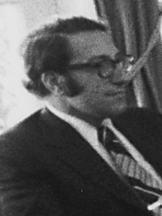

Director of the Office of Public Liaison
- In office March 10, 1973 – January 20, 1977
- President: Richard Nixon; Gerald Ford
- Preceded by: Chuck Colson
- Succeeded by: Midge Costanza

Personal details
- Born: November 5, 1937 Manchester, New Hampshire, U.S.
- Died: June 8, 1996 (aged 58) Alexandria, Virginia, U.S.
- Party: Republican
- Parent: William J. Baroody Sr. (father)
- Education: College of the Holy Cross (BA)

Military service
- Allegiance: United States
- Branch: United States Navy

William Joseph Baroody Jr. (November 5, 1937 – June 8, 1996) was an American policy analyst who served as Director of the Office of Public Liaison under President Gerald Ford from 1973 to 1977. He then became the president of the American Enterprise Institute (AEI). His leadership of the think tank saw AEI enjoy new levels of political influence but was cut short by financial problems.

== Early life and education ==
William Joseph Baroody Jr. was born on November 5, 1937, in Manchester, New Hampshire. His father was William J. Baroody Sr., who later served as the president of the American Enterprise Institute (AEI). He was one of six siblings: two brothers, Joseph D. Baroody and Michael E. Baroody, and four sisters. His brothers also became involved in public affairs: Joseph worked in public relations and later served as an officer of the National Association of Arab Americans, while Michael became communications director of the Republican National Committee.

Baroody was raised in Washington, D.C. His father's role at AEI figured prominently in his childhood, as his father's work there brought local and national leaders to meetings at the Baroody family's home in Alexandria, Virginia, which influenced Baroody's decision to also pursue a career in public service.

Baroody attended the College of the Holy Cross in Worcester, Massachusetts, graduating with a Bachelor of Arts in English literature in 1959. As an undergraduate at Holy Cross, he was a member of the college's Naval Reserve Officers Training Corps (NROTC). After graduation, he served as an officer in the United States Navy from 1959 to 1961 aboard the USS Chilton, which was based at Norfolk, Virginia. He then pursued graduate studies in political science at Georgetown University from 1961 to 1963.

== Government career ==
Baroody joined the staffs of U.S. Representative Melvin Laird and of the House Appropriations Committee in 1961, and later served as an aide to Laird at the Pentagon from 1969 to 1973.

In 1973 Baroody moved over to the White House to take over for the recently resigned Charles Colson. He worked hard to dispel his office's reputation as the "office of dirty tricks" that had developed under Colson. He consolidated the varied interest group efforts of the Nixon administration into a single office, which incoming President Gerald R. Ford titled the Office of Public Liaison.

Baroody changed the tactics of the administration from strong-arming legislators to one of persuasion. "Under Baroody’s direction, the office incorporated outreach efforts with consumers and women that had been located elsewhere in the White House, and the overall staff grew to approximately thirty. At the core of its activities was an aggressive campaign of regional conferences that enabled the nation's first unelected president to tour the country in a campaign-like atmosphere and prepare the way for an eventual reelection campaign. In Washington, D.C., Baroody also coordinated an extensive series of White House briefings for group and association leaders on a variety of policy topics that brought together group leaders and administration policy-makers."

== Presidency of AEI ==
Baroody's father, William J. Baroody Sr., had been president of the influential, right-leaning think tank since 1962. The younger Baroody became executive vice president of the institute in 1977 and president in 1978. Baroody Sr. died in 1980.

Baroody's tenure at the institute saw increasing growth. With the inauguration of President Ronald Reagan in 1981, many AEI scholars' ideas on deregulation, the Cold War, the culture war, constitutional law, and other issues achieved currency and a receptive audience. Many AEI scholars left the institute for government service, including Jeane Kirkpatrick, Robert Bork, and James C. Miller III. Baroody expanded AEI's activities, producing more publications and introducing new research areas. However, the Reagan administration saw the emergence of new think tanks, including The Heritage Foundation and competition for funding increased. Insiders lamented a pursuit of prestige, evidenced by Baroody's hiring of Ford as a distinguished fellow, at the expense of more ideological conservative scholars. Some donors were concerned about AEI's centrist trend and perceived loss of conservative principle.

With AEI on the verge of bankruptcy in June 1986, Baroody resigned and was replaced on an interim basis by the respected economist Paul McCracken.

Political offices
Preceded by Chuck Colson	Director of the Office of Public Liaison; 1973–1977	Succeeded by Midge Costanza
Non-profit organization positions
Preceded by William Baroody	President of the American Enterprise Institute; 1978–1986	Succeeded by Paul McCracken; Acting
