= Timeline of diplomatic relations of the Republic of China =

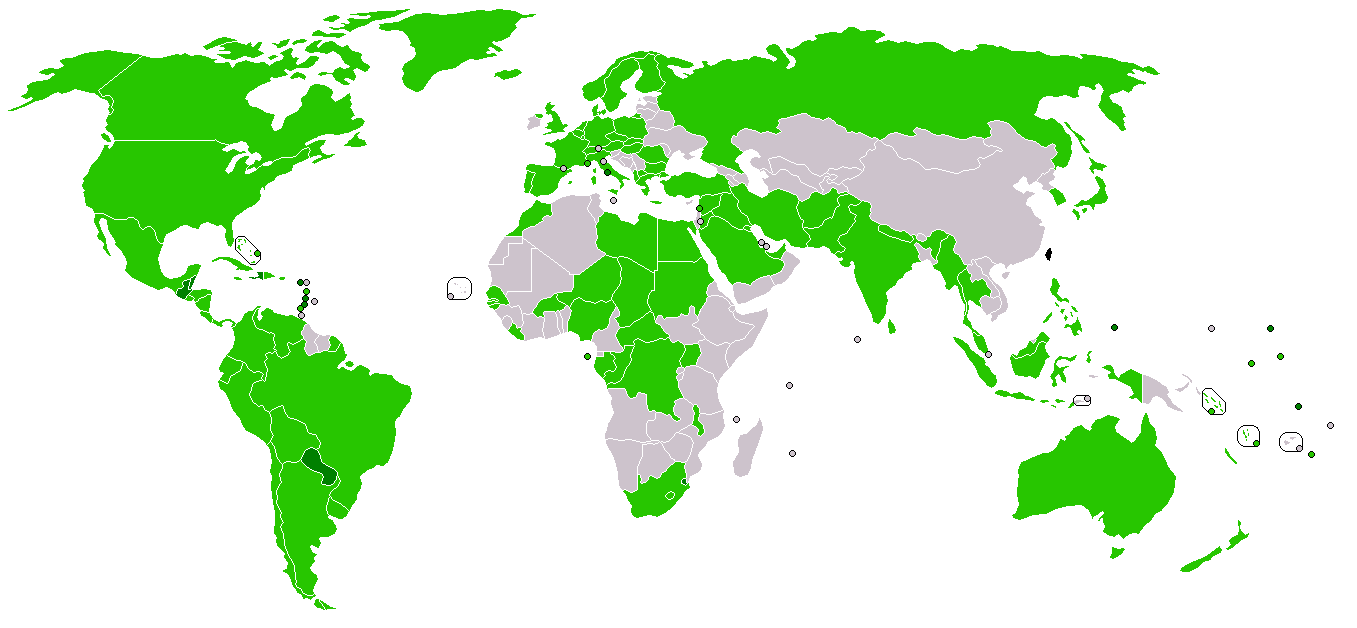
Republic of China Countries that have diplomatic relations with the ROC Countries that formerly had diplomatic relations with the ROC Countries that have never had diplomatic relations with the ROC

Numerous states have ceased their diplomatic recognition of the Republic of China during the last 70 years, since the founding of the People's Republic of China. Under the One China policy, the ROC is recognized by 11 UN member states and Holy See with 59 UN member states and Somaliland maintaining unofficial cultural and economic relations.

== Timeline ==
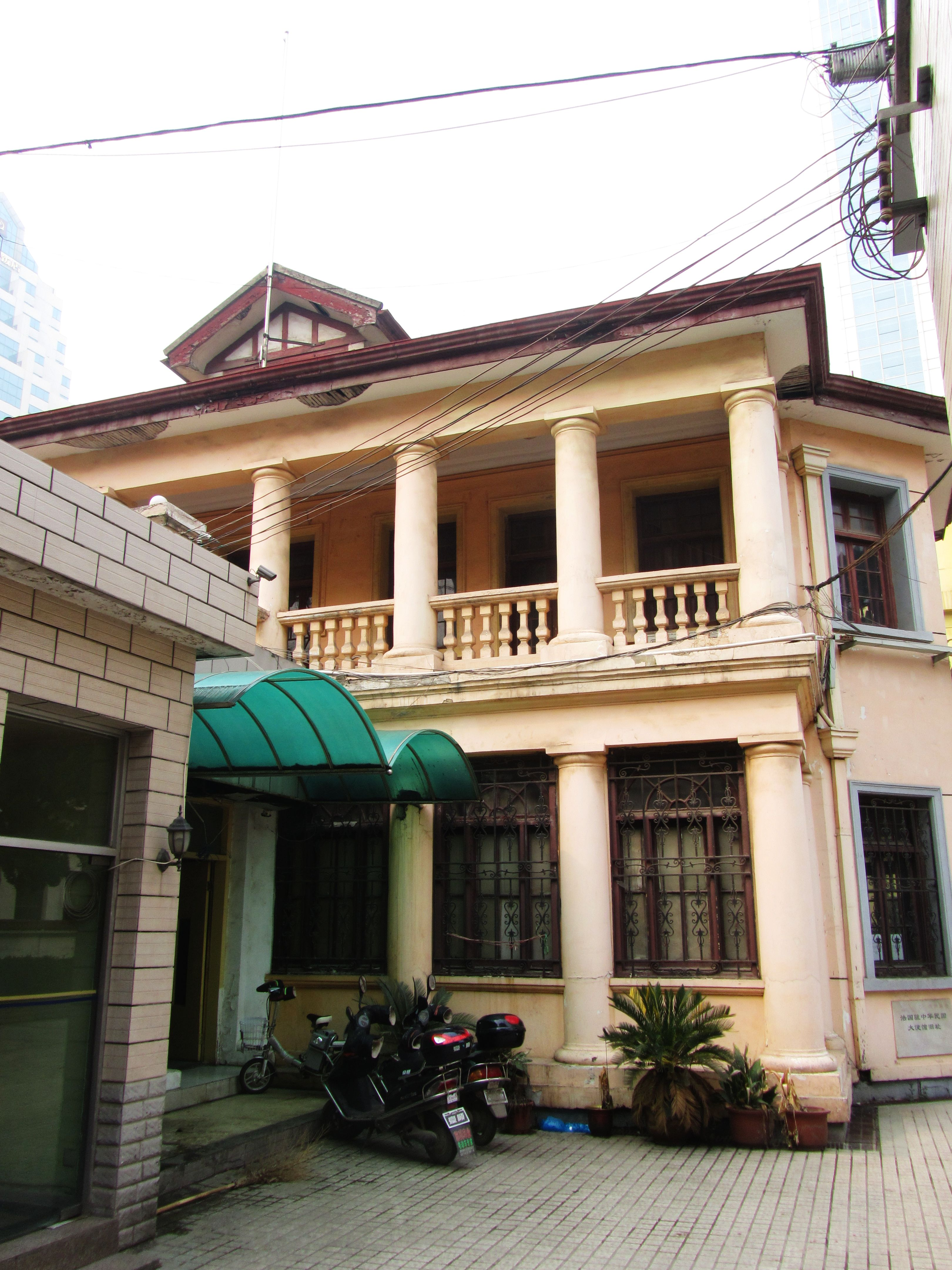
Former French Embassy to the Republic of China in Nanjing.

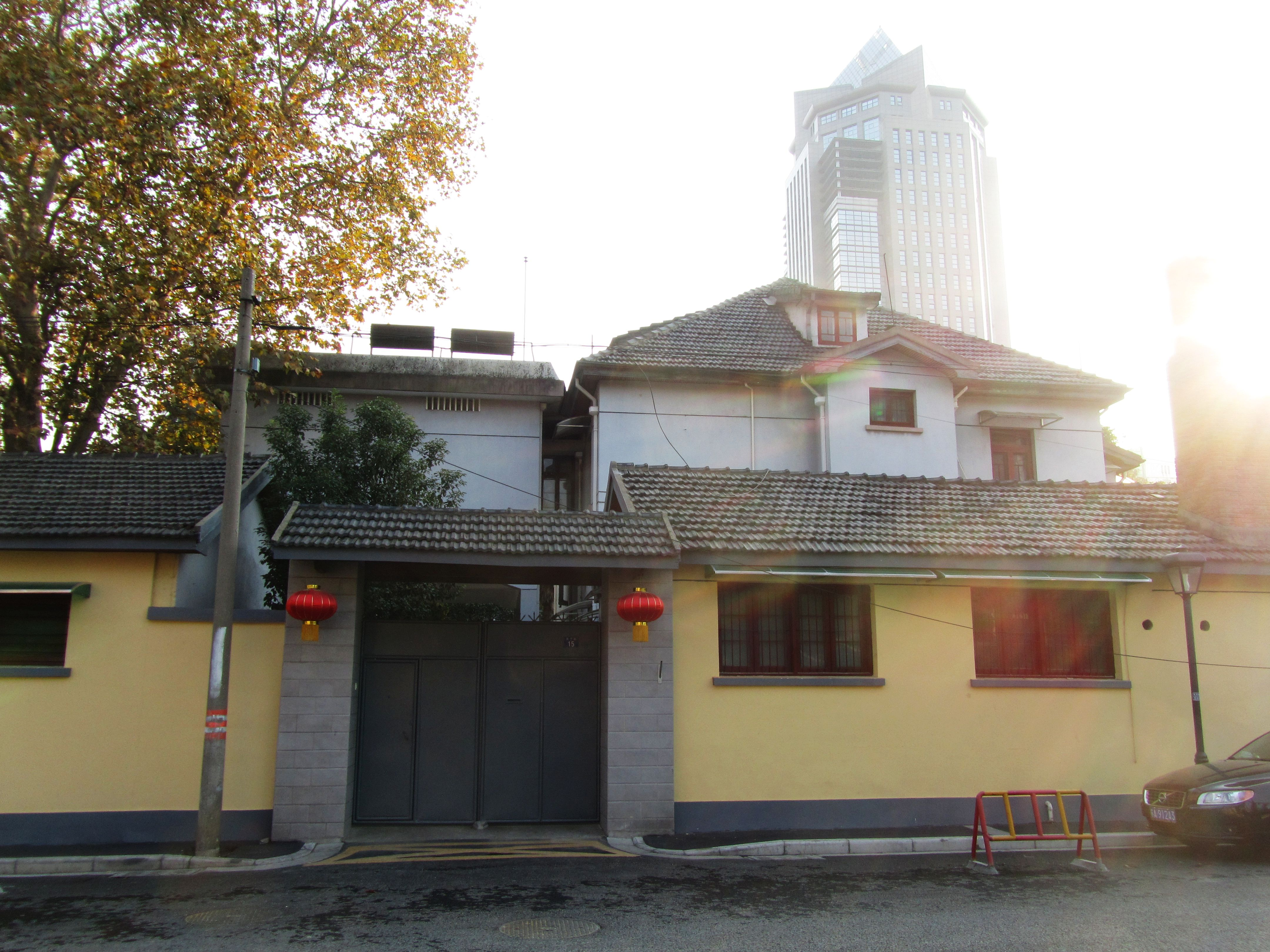
Former Mexican Embassy to the Republic of China in Nanjing.

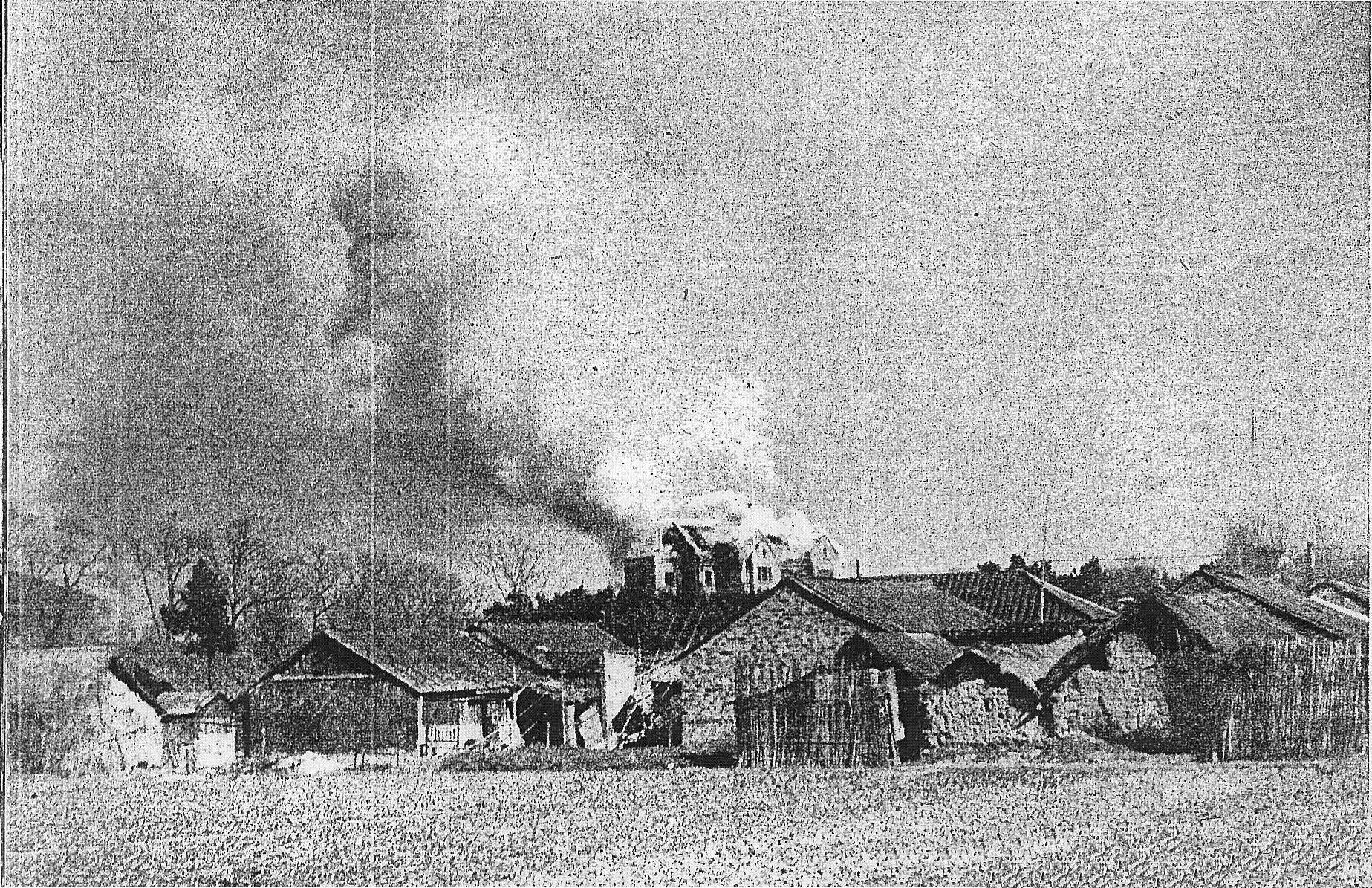
Former Soviet Union Embassy to the Republic of China in Nanjing.

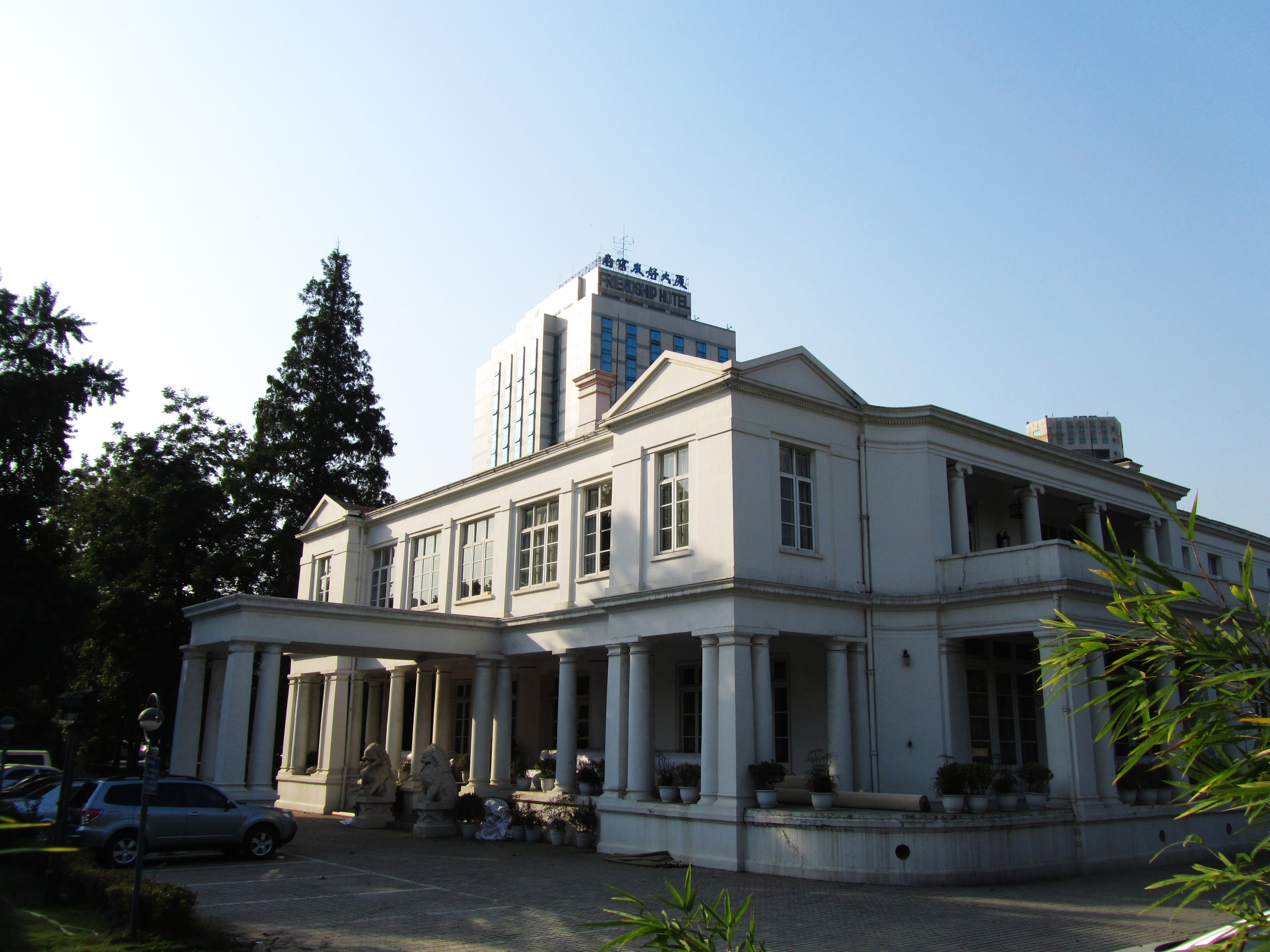
Former United Kingdom Embassy to the Republic of China in Nanjing.

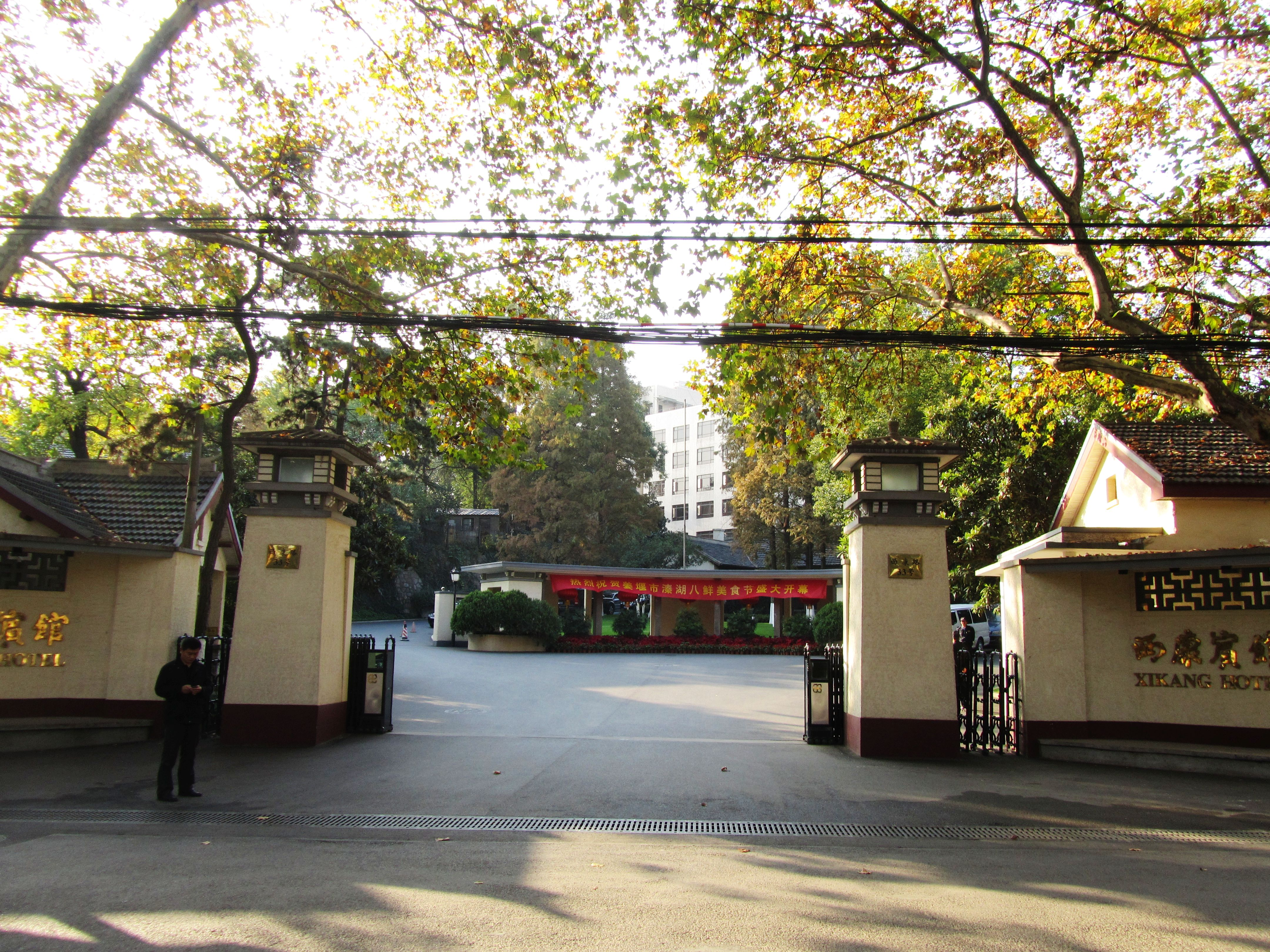
Former United States Embassy to the Republic of China in Nanjing.

The timeline of diplomatic relations of the Republic of China encompasses the years from 1912 to 1949 (the establishment of the People's Republic of China), and the year of the Taipei Economic and Cultural Representative Office (TECRO) establishments as a substitute for embassies in the absence of official diplomatic relations with the ROC.

Year	State	Event	TECRO establishment
1912	Australia	Recognition; continuation of relations began under the Qing dynasty in 1908	
1912	Austria-Hungary	Recognition; relations began in 1869	
1912	Belgium	Recognition; relations began in 1865	
1912	Brazil	Recognition; relations began in 1880	
1912	Canada	Recognition; relations began in 1909	
1912	Cape Colony	Recognition; relations began in 1904	
1912	Cuba	Recognition; relations began in 1902	
1912	Denmark	Recognition; relations began in 1908	
1912	Italy	Recognition; relations began in 1866	
1912	Japan	Recognition; relations began in 1871	
1912	Mexico	Recognition; relations began in 1899	
1912	Netherlands	Recognition; relations began in 1863	
1912	New Zealand	Recognition; continuation of relations began under the Qing dynasty in 1908	
1912	Norway	Recognition; relations began in 1847	
1912	Portugal	Recognition; relations began in 1862	
1912	Sweden	Recognition; relations began in 1847	
1912	United Kingdom	Recognition; continuation of relations begun in the Qing dynasty	1963
1912	United States	Recognition; continuation of relations begun in the Qing dynasty in 1844	
1913	France	Recognition; continuation of relations begun in the Qing dynasty	
1913	Russia	Recognition; relations began in 1878	
1913	Germany	Recognition of the establishment of the Republic of China; relations began in 1861.	
1913	Norway	Recognition; continuation of relations begun in the Qing dynasty in 1851 when Norway was part of Sweden	
1913	Peru	Recognition; continuation of relations begun in the Qing dynasty in 1875	
1915	Chile	Diplomatic relations established	
1917	Germany	Diplomatic relations ceased (first time)	
1918	Russia	Diplomatic relations ceased (first time)	
1918	Switzerland	Diplomatic relations established	
1919	Bolivia	Diplomatic relations established	
1919	Finland	Diplomatic relations established	
1919	Poland	Diplomatic relations established	
1921	Estonia	Diplomatic relations established	
1921	Germany	Diplomatic relations resumed (first time)	
1921	Lithuania	Diplomatic relations established	2021
1922	Panama	Diplomatic re-established; relations began with the Qing dynasty in 1909.	
1923	Latvia	Diplomatic relations established	1992 (Consulate); 1995
1924	Soviet Union	Diplomatic relations resumed (first time)	
1929	Soviet Union	Diplomatic relations ceased (second time)	
1930	Nicaragua	Diplomatic relations established	
1931	Czechoslovakia	Diplomatic relations established	
1932	Soviet Union	Diplomatic relations resumed (second time)	
1933	Guatemala	Diplomatic relations established	
1934	Monaco	Diplomatic relations established	
1934	Turkey	Diplomatic relations established	
1937	Iran	Diplomatic relations established	
1937	Japan	Diplomatic relations ceased (Beginning of the Second Sino-Japanese War)	
1939	Romania	Diplomatic relations established	
1941	Nazi Germany	Diplomatic relations ceased (second time, German diplomatic recognition of the Wang Jingwei regime)	
1941	Colombia	Diplomatic relations established	
1941	Honduras	Diplomatic relations established	
1941	Italy	Diplomatic relations ceased (first time, Italian diplomatic recognition of the Wang Jingwei regime)	
1941	Romania	Diplomatic relations ceased (Romanian diplomatic recognition of the Wang Jingwei regime)	
1942	Holy See	Diplomatic relations established	
1942	El Salvador	Diplomatic relations established	
1942	Iraq	Diplomatic relations established	
1944	Afghanistan	Diplomatic relations established	
1944	Dominican Republic	Diplomatic relations established	
1945	Yugoslavia	Diplomatic relations established	
1946	Italy	Diplomatic relations resumed (second time)	
1946	Mongolia	Recognition achieved	
1946	Syria	Recognition achieved	
1946	Thailand	Diplomatic relations established	
1947	Bulgaria	Diplomatic relations established	
1947	Saudi Arabia	Diplomatic relations established	
1947	India	Diplomatic relations established	
1948	Burma	Diplomatic relations established	
1949	Israel	Recognition achieved	
1949	Luxembourg	Diplomatic relations established	
1949	South Africa	Diplomatic relations resumed	
1949	South Korea	Diplomatic relations re-established, relations began under the Korean Empire in 1899	
1949	Soviet Union	Diplomatic relations ceased (third time)	1993 (in Russia)
1949	Czechoslovakia	Diplomatic relations ceased	1991 (in Czech Republic); 2003 (in Slovakia)
1949	Poland	Diplomatic relations ceased	1992?
1949	Hungary	Diplomatic relations ceased	1990
1949	Bulgaria	Diplomatic relations ceased	
1950	Afghanistan	Diplomatic relations ceased	
1950	Norway	Diplomatic relations ceased	1980 to 2017
1950	Switzerland	Diplomatic relations ceased	1973
1950	Finland	Diplomatic relations ceased	1990
1950	Sweden	Diplomatic relations ceased	1981?
1950	Denmark	Diplomatic relations ceased	1973? or 1980
1950	India	Diplomatic relations ceased	1995
1950	Ceylon	Diplomatic relations ceased	
1950	Burma	Diplomatic relations ceased	2015 or 2016
1950	Indonesia	Diplomatic relations ceased	1971
1951	Pakistan	Diplomatic relations ceased	
1952	Japan	Diplomatic relations re-established (2nd time)	
1953	Laos	Diplomatic relations established	
1953	Mongolia	Recognition revoked	2002
1954	Lebanon	Diplomatic relations established	
1954	Netherlands	Diplomatic relations ceased	1981
1955	South Vietnam	Diplomatic relations established	
1955	West Germany	Diplomatic relations resumed (second time)	
1955	Nepal	Diplomatic relations ceased	
1955	Yugoslavia	Diplomatic relations ceased	
1956	Egypt	Diplomatic relations ceased	
1956	Iran	Diplomatic relations established	
1956	Syria	Recognition withdrawn	
1956	Haiti	Diplomatic relations established	
1957	Jordan	Diplomatic relations established	
1957	Paraguay	Diplomatic relations established	
1958	Iraq	Diplomatic relations ceased	
1958	Morocco	Diplomatic relations ceased	
1959	Sudan	Diplomatic relations ceased	
1960	Cuba	Diplomatic relations ceased	
1960	Nigeria	Diplomatic relations established (1st time)	
1960	Guatemala	Diplomatic relations established	
1960	Congo-Léopoldville	Diplomatic relations established (1st time)	
1961	El Salvador	Diplomatic relations established	
1961	Congo-Léopoldville	Diplomatic relations ceased (1st time)	
1961	Laos	Diplomatic relations ceased (first time)	
1961	Upper Volta	Diplomatic relations established (1st time)	
1961	Congo-Léopoldville	Diplomatic relations resumed (1st time)	
1962	Laos	Diplomatic relations resumed	
1962	Uganda	Diplomatic relations ceased	
1963	Niger	Diplomatic relations established (1st time)	
1964	France	Diplomatic relations ceased	1974
1964	Central African Republic	Diplomatic relations ceased (1st time)	
1964	Malaysia	Diplomatic relations established	
1966	Malawi	Diplomatic relations established	
1966	Lesotho	Diplomatic relations established (1st time)	
1968	Gambia	Diplomatic relations established (1st time)	
1968	Central African Republic	Diplomatic relations resumed (2nd time)	
1968	Swaziland	Diplomatic relations established	
1969	Senegal	Diplomatic relations established (1st time)	
1970	Italy	Diplomatic relations ceased (second time)	1990
1970	Khmer Republic	Diplomatic relations established	
1970	Canada	Diplomatic relations ceased	1991
1971	Chile	Diplomatic relations ceased	1975
1971	Belgium	Diplomatic relations ceased	1971
1971	Austria	Diplomatic relations ceased	1972
1971	Iceland	Diplomatic relations ceased	
1971	Turkey	Diplomatic relations ceased	1989?
1971	Iran	Diplomatic relations ceased	
1971	Kuwait	Diplomatic relations ceased	1986
1971	Lebanon	Diplomatic relations ceased	
1971	Peru	Diplomatic relations ceased	1978
1971	Nigeria	Diplomatic relations ceased	1991
1972	United Kingdom	Diplomatic relations ceased	1963 (as "The Free Chinese Centre, London"); 1993
1972	Japan	Diplomatic relations ceased (second)	1972
1972	West Germany	Diplomatic relations ceased (third time)	1999 (in Germany)
1972	Greece	Diplomatic relations ceased	1973
1972	Australia	Diplomatic relations ceased	1992
1972	New Zealand	Diplomatic relations ceased	1973
1972	Luxembourg	Diplomatic relations ceased	1975
1972	Mexico	Diplomatic relations ceased	1989?
1972	Argentina	Diplomatic relations ceased	1995
1972	Jamaica	Diplomatic relations ceased	
1972	Chad	Diplomatic relations ceased (1st time)	
1972	Zaire	Diplomatic relations ceased (2nd time)	
1972	Senegal	Diplomatic relations ceased (1st time)	
1973	Spain	Diplomatic relations ceased	1973
1973	Upper Volta	Diplomatic relations ceased (1st time)	
1974	Malaysia	Diplomatic relations ceased	1974
1974	Brazil	Diplomatic relations ceased	1975
1974	Venezuela	Diplomatic relations ceased	
1974	Niger	Diplomatic relations ceased (1st time)	
1974	Gabon	Diplomatic relations ceased	
1974	Gambia	Diplomatic relations ceased (1st time)	
1975	Thailand	Diplomatic relations ceased	1975
1975	Khmer Republic	Diplomatic relations ceased	1994 to 1997
1975	South Vietnam	Defeat of South Vietnam	1992 (in Vietnam)
1975	Laos	Diplomatic relations ceased (2nd time)	
1975	Philippines	Diplomatic relations ceased	
1976	Central African Republic	Diplomatic relations ceased (2nd time)	
1977	Jordan	Diplomatic relations ceased	1977
1977	Liberia	Diplomatic relations ceased (1st time)	
1978	Libya	Diplomatic relations ceased	1980 to 1997 (1st time); 2008 to 2011 (2nd time)
1979	United States	Diplomatic relations ceased	1979
1979	Portugal	Diplomatic relations ceased	1992
1979	Colombia	Diplomatic relations ceased	1980?
1979	Tuvalu	Diplomatic relations established	
1980	Nauru	Diplomatic relations established (1st time)	
1980	Ecuador	Diplomatic relations ceased	
1981	Saint Vincent and the Grenadines	Diplomatic relations established	
1983	Dominica	Diplomatic relations established	
1983	Lesotho	Diplomatic relations ceased (first)	
1983	Solomon Islands	Diplomatic relations established	
1983	Saint Kitts and Nevis	Diplomatic relations established	
1984	United Arab Emirates	Diplomatic relations ceased	1984?
1984	Saint Lucia	Diplomatic relations established (1st time)	
1985	Bolivia	Diplomatic relations ceased	1990 to 2009
1985	Nicaragua	Diplomatic relations ceased (1st time)	
1988	Uruguay	Diplomatic relations ceased	1992 to 2002
1989	Grenada	Diplomatic relations established	
1989	Liberia	Diplomatic relations resumed (2nd time)	
1989	Bahamas	Diplomatic relations established	
1989	Belize	Diplomatic relations established	
1990	Saudi Arabia	Diplomatic relations ceased	1990
1990	Guinea-Bissau	Diplomatic relations established	
1990	Lesotho	Diplomatic relations established (2nd time)	
1990	Nicaragua	Diplomatic relations resumed	
1991	Central African Republic	Diplomatic relations resumed (3rd time)	
1991	China	De facto recognition	
1992	South Korea	Diplomatic relations ceased	1993? or 1994
1992	Israel	Recognition withdrawn	1993
1992	Niger	Diplomatic relations resumed (2nd time)	
1993	Liberia	Diplomatic relations ceased (2nd time)	
1994	Lesotho	Diplomatic relations ceased (2nd time)	
1994	Burkina Faso (formerly Upper Volta)	Diplomatic relations established (2nd time)	
1995	Monaco	Diplomatic relations ceased	
1995	Gambia	Diplomatic relations resumed	
1996	Niger	Diplomatic relations ceased (2nd time)	
1996	Senegal	Diplomatic relations resumed (2nd time)	
1997	Bahamas	Diplomatic relations ceased	
1997	Chad	Diplomatic relations resumed (2nd time)	
1997	Liberia	Diplomatic relations resumed (3rd time)	
1997	Saint Lucia	Diplomatic relations ceased (1st time)	
1997	São Tomé and Príncipe	Diplomatic relations established	
1998	South Africa	Diplomatic relations ceased	1998
1998	Central African Republic	Diplomatic relations ceased (3rd time)	
1998	Guinea-Bissau	Diplomatic relations ceased	
1998	Tonga	Diplomatic relations ceased	
1998	Marshall Islands	Diplomatic relations established	
1999	Papua New Guinea	Diplomatic relations maintained for 16 days	1990
1999	Macedonia	Diplomatic relations established	
1999	Palau	Diplomatic relations established	
2001	Macedonia	Diplomatic relations ceased	
2002	Nauru	Diplomatic relations ceased (1st time)	
2003	Liberia	Diplomatic relations ceased (3rd time)	
2003	Kiribati	Diplomatic relations established	
2004	Dominica	Diplomatic relations ceased	
2004	Vanuatu	Diplomatic relations maintained for a week	
2005	Grenada	Diplomatic relations ceased	
2005	Nauru	Diplomatic relations resumed (2nd time)	
2005	Senegal	Diplomatic relations ceased (2nd time)	
2006	Chad	Diplomatic relations ceased (2nd time)	
2007	Saint Lucia	Diplomatic relations resumed (2nd time)	
2007	Costa Rica	Diplomatic relations ceased	
2008	Kosovo	Recognition achieved	
2008	Malawi	Diplomatic relations ceased	
2013	Gambia	Diplomatic relations ceased (2nd time)	
2016	São Tomé and Príncipe	Diplomatic relations ceased	
2017	Panama	Diplomatic relations ceased	
2018	Dominican Republic	Diplomatic relations ceased	
2018	Burkina Faso	Diplomatic relations ceased (2nd time)	
2018	El Salvador	Diplomatic relations ceased	
2019	Solomon Islands	Diplomatic relations ceased	
2019	Kiribati	Diplomatic relations ceased	
2020	Somaliland	Unofficial relations established	
2021	Nicaragua	Diplomatic relations ceased (2nd time)	
2023	Honduras	Diplomatic relations ceased	
2024	Nauru	Diplomatic relations ceased (2nd time)	

== See also ==
ROC

- Foreign relations of Taiwan

PRC

- Foreign relations of China
- Dates of establishment of diplomatic relations with the People's Republic of China
