= Dates of establishment of diplomatic relations with the People's Republic of China =

Since its founding in 1949, the People's Republic of China (PRC) has had a diplomatic tug-of-war with its rival in Taiwan, the Republic of China (ROC). Throughout the Cold War, both governments claimed to be the sole legitimate government of all China and allowed countries to recognize either one or the other. Until the 1970s, most Western countries in the Western Bloc recognized the ROC while the Eastern Bloc and Third World countries generally recognized the PRC. This gradually shifted and today only 11 UN member states recognize the ROC while the PRC is recognized by the United Nations, as well as 181 UN member states (including 18 G20 member states (Note: Other two members are the European Union, which is not a country, and China itself)), Cook Islands, Niue and the State of Palestine. The PRC maintains the requirement of recognizing its view of the One China policy to establish or maintain diplomatic relations.

Countries of the world indicating decade diplomatic relations commenced with the PRC: 1949/1950s (dark red), 1960s (red), 1970s (orange), 1980s (beige), 1990s/2000s (yellow), and 2010s/2020s (green). Countries not recognised by or not recognising the PRC are in grey . The PRC itself is in black .

== Recognition of the PRC before it was seated at the UN ==
=== 1949 ===
The PRC was established on 1 October 1949, when the Chinese Civil War was still underway, and the seat of Government of the Republic of China in Canton was not relocated to Taipei until December 1949. All the countries that recognized the new PRC government in 1949 were communist states.

| Country | Date |
|---|---|
| Union of Soviet Socialist Republics (Note: Succeeded by the Russian Federation on 25 December 1991.) | 2 October 1949 |
| People's Republic of Bulgaria (Note: Succeeded by the Republic of Bulgaria in 1990.) | 4 October 1949 |
| Romanian People's Republic (Note: Renamed to the Socialist Republic of Romania in 1965 and again to Romania in 1989.) | 5 October 1949 |
| Hungarian People's Republic (Note: Renamed to the Hungarian Republic in 1989 and again to Hungary in 2012.) | 6 October 1949 |
| Democratic People's Republic of Korea (North Korea) | 6 October 1949 |
| Czechoslovak Republic (Note: Renamed to the Czechoslovak Socialist Republic in 1960, again to Czechoslovak Federative Republic and Czech and Slovak Federative Republic in 1990. Separated into the Czech Republic and the Slovak Republic in 1993.) | 6 October 1949 |
| Republic of Poland (Note: Renamed to the Polish People's Republic in 1952 and the Republic of Poland in 1989.) | 7 October 1949 |
| Mongolian People's Republic (Note: Succeeded by Mongolia in 1992. Recognition was extended to Mongolia as the Republic of China in 1946, but was rescinded in 1953.) | 16 October 1949 |
| German Democratic Republic (Note: Succeeded by the Federal Republic of Germany (reunified Germany) on 3 October 1990.) (East Germany) | 27 October 1949 |
| People's Republic of Albania (Note: Renamed to the People's Socialist Republic of Albania in 1976 and again to the Republic of Albania in 1991.) | 23 November 1949 |

=== 1950s ===
| Country | Date |
|---|---|
| Democratic Republic of Vietnam (Note: Now the Socialist Republic of Vietnam.) (North Vietnam) | 18 January 1950 |
| Republic of India | 1 April 1950 |
| Republic of Indonesia | 13 April 1950 |
| Kingdom of Sweden | 9 May 1950 |
| Kingdom of Denmark | 11 May 1950 |
| Union of Burma (Note: Now the Republic of the Union of Myanmar.) | 8 June 1950 |
| Swiss Confederation (Note: First western country to establish diplomatic relations.) | 14 September 1950 |
| Principality of Liechtenstein | 14 September 1950 |
| Republic of Finland | 28 October 1950 |
| Pakistan (Note: Now the Islamic Republic of Pakistan.) (Note: First non-communist and Muslim-majority nation to open diplomatic relations.) | 21 May 1951 |
| United Kingdom of Great Britain and Northern Ireland (Note: Request refused by the PRC) (Note: On 6 January 1950, the United Kingdom recognized the PRC and requested the exchange of ambassadors, but this was refused. The UK and The Netherlands established diplomatic relations at chargé d'affaires level with the PRC on 17 June 1954 and 19 November 1954 respectively. The PRC government does not regard the semi-diplomatic relations at chargé d'affaires level as formal diplomatic ties. The UK does. The PRC consented to the exchange of ambassadors with the UK on 13 March 1972 and with The Netherlands on 18 May 1972. See Sino-British relations for further details.) | 17 June 1954 |
| Kingdom of Norway | 5 October 1954 |
| Federal People’s Republic of Yugoslavia (Note: Republic of Serbia attempted to succeed but all other former Yugoslav Republics deferred the attempt, and no consensus was reached in the first period. The Federal Republic of Yugoslavia est. 1992-02-28 was not granted successorship and was placed under international sanctions. In 2001 an Agreement on Succession Issues was signed and reached validity in 2004, by the provisions of that Agreement FRY is not the successor of SFRY. Serbia and Montenegro succeeded the United Nations seat of the FRY (joined the UN as a new member on 2000-11-01) "Succession" of recognition by Serbia, successor state of Serbia and Montenegro is due to international law inadmissible. Arbitration Commission of the Peace Conference on the former Yugoslavia Opinion No. 10 (Federal Republic of Yugoslavia - Serbia and Montenegro). In this decision, the Commission ruled that the FRY (Serbia and Montenegro) could not legally be considered a continuation of the former SFRY, but was rather a new state. Thus the European Community (and the UN) should not automatically recognize the FRY, but apply to it the same criteria applied to the recognition of the other post-SFRY states.) | 2 January 1955 |
| Kingdom of Afghanistan (Note: Now the Islamic Emirate of Afghanistan.) | 20 January 1955 |
| Kingdom of Nepal (Note: Now the Federal Democratic Republic of Nepal.) | 1 August 1955 |
| Republic of Egypt (Note: Now the Arab Republic of Egypt.) | 30 May 1956 |
| Syrian Republic (Note: Now the Syrian Arab Republic.) | 1 August 1956 |
| Mutawakkilite Kingdom of Yemen (Note: Later Yemen Arab Republic.) (Note: Succeeded by the Republic of Yemen. Date of establishment of diplomatic relations was set back to 24 September 1956.) (North Yemen) | 24 September 1956 |
| Ceylon (Note: Now the Democratic Socialist Republic of Sri Lanka.) | 7 February 1957 |
| Kingdom of Cambodia (Note: Relations were suspended on 18 March 1970 when the Khmer Republic established relations with the ROC. Diplomatic ties resumed on 17 April 1975 by the Khmer Rouge government.) | 19 July 1958 |
| Iraqi Republic (Note: Now the Republic of Iraq.) | 25 August 1958 |
| Kingdom of Morocco | 1 November 1958 |
| Republic of Algeria (Note: Now the People's Democratic Republic of Algeria.) | 20 December 1958 |
| Republic of the Sudan | 4 February 1959 |
| Republic of Guinea | 4 October 1959 |

=== 1960s ===
| Country | Date |
|---|---|
| Republic of Ghana | 5 July 1960 |
| Republic of Cuba | 28 September 1960 |
| Republic of Mali | 25 October 1960 |
| Somali Republic (Note: Now the Federal Republic of Somalia.) | 14 December 1960 |
| (Democratic Republic of the Congo) Free Republic of the Congo (Note: Rival government during the Congo Crisis, succeeded by the Republic of the Congo (Léopoldville) in September 1961.) | 20 February 1961 |
| Kingdom of Laos (Note: Now the Lao People's Democratic Republic.) | 25 April 1961 |
| Tanganyika (Note: Tanganyika merged with Zanzibar from 26 April 1964.) (Note: Now the United Republic of Tanzania.) | 9 December 1961 |
| Uganda | 18 October 1962 |
| Sultanate of Zanzibar (Note: Zanzibar merged into mainland Tanganyika on 26 April 1964.) | 11 December 1963 |
| Kenya | 14 December 1963 |
| Kingdom of Burundi (Note: Now the Republic of Burundi.) (Note: Diplomatic relations were restored on 13 October 1971 after Burundi unilaterally severed relations on 29 January 1965.) | 21 December 1963 |
| Republic of Tunisia | 10 January 1964 |
| French Republic | 27 January 1964 |
| Republic of the Congo (Brazzaville) | 22 February 1964 |
| Central African Republic (Note: Diplomatic relations were restored on 29 January 1998. CAR resumed diplomatic ties with the ROC on 8 July 1991.) | 29 September 1964 |
| Republic of Zambia | 29 October 1964 |
| Republic of Dahomey (Note: Now the Republic of Benin.) (Note: Diplomatic relations were restored on 29 December 1972. Both countries severed diplomatic relations on 3 January 1966 prior to Dahomey resumed diplomatic ties with the ROC on 21 April 1966.) | 12 November 1964 |
| Islamic Republic of Mauritania | 19 July 1965 |
| People's Republic of South Yemen (Note: Later People's Democratic Republic of Yemen.) (South Yemen) | 31 January 1968 |
| Republic of South Vietnam (Note: Succeeded by the Socialist Republic of Vietnam on 2 July 1976.) | 14 June 1969 |

=== 1970s ===
| Country | Date |
|---|---|
| Canada | 13 October 1970 |
| Republic of Equatorial Guinea | 15 October 1970 |
| Italian Republic | 6 November 1970 |
| Ethiopian Empire (Note: Now the Federal Democratic Republic of Ethiopia.) | 24 November 1970 |
| Republic of Chile | 15 December 1970 |
| Federal Republic of Nigeria | 10 February 1971 |
| State of Kuwait | 22 March 1971 |
| Federal Republic of Cameroon | 26 March 1971 |
| Republic of San Marino (Note: Diplomatic relations were raised to ambassadorial level on 15 July 1991.) | 6 May 1971 |
| Republic of Austria | 28 May 1971 |
| Republic of Sierra Leone | 29 July 1971 |
| Republic of Turkey | 4 August 1971 |
| Imperial State of Iran (Note: Now the Islamic Republic of Iran.) | 16 August 1971 |

== Recognition of the PRC after it was seated at the UN ==
The Republic of China, which had occupied China's seat at the United Nations since 1945, was effectively expelled on 25 October 1971, through Resolution 2758 approved in the general assembly of said date. Its seat was taken over by the People's Republic of China from 15 November 1971, and the migration of relations to the PRC soon followed among members of the Western Bloc, except for the United Kingdom, France, Canada, Italy and the Scandinavian Countries which had previously established diplomatic relations.

=== 1970s ===
| Country | Date |
|---|---|
| Kingdom of Belgium | 25 October 1971 |
| Republic of Peru | 2 November 1971 |
| Republic of Lebanon | 9 November 1971 |
| Republic of Rwanda | 12 November 1971 |
| Republic of Senegal (Note: Senegal resumed diplomatic relations with the ROC on 6 January 1996. Ties with the PRC were severed from 9 January 1996, until 25 October 2005, when ties were resumed.) | 7 December 1971 |
| Iceland | 8 December 1971 |
| Republic of Cyprus | 14 December 1971 |
| State of Malta (Note: Now the Republic of Malta.) | 31 January 1972 |
| United Mexican States | 14 February 1972 |
| Argentine Republic | 19 February 1972 |
| United Kingdom of Great Britain and Northern Ireland | 13 March 1972 |
| Mauritius (Note: Now the Republic of Mauritius.) | 15 April 1972 |
| Kingdom of the Netherlands | 18 May 1972 |
| Kingdom of Greece (Note: Now the Hellenic Republic.) | 5 June 1972 |
| Co-operative Republic of Guyana | 27 June 1972 |
| Togolese Republic | 19 September 1972 |
| Japan | 29 September 1972 |
| Federal Republic of Germany (West Germany) | 11 October 1972 |
| Republic of Maldives | 14 October 1972 |
| Malagasy Republic (Note: Now the Republic of Madagascar.) | 6 November 1972 |
| Grand Duchy of Luxembourg | 16 November 1972 |
| Jamaica | 21 November 1972 |
| Republic of Zaire (Note: Renamed to the Democratic Republic of the Congo in 1997.) | 24 November 1972 |
| Republic of Chad (Note: Diplomatic relations were restored on 6 August 2006. Diplomatic relations were severed by PRC on 15 August 1997 after Chad resumed diplomatic ties with the ROC on 12 August 1997.) | 28 November 1972 |
| Commonwealth of Australia | 21 December 1972 |
| New Zealand | 22 December 1972 |
| Spanish State (Note: Now the Kingdom of Spain.) | 9 March 1973 |
| Republic of Upper Volta (Note: Now Burkina Faso.) (Note: Diplomatic relations were restored on 26 May 2018. Diplomatic relations were severed by PRC on 4 February 1994 after Burkina Faso resumed diplomatic ties with the ROC on 2 February 1994.) | 15 September 1973 |
| Republic of Guinea-Bissau (Note: Diplomatic relations were restored on 13 April 1998. Diplomatic relations were severed by PRC on 31 May 1990 after Guinea-Bissau established diplomatic ties with the ROC on 26 May 1990.) | 15 March 1974 |
| Gabonese Republic | 20 April 1974 |
| Malaysia | 31 May 1974 |
| Trinidad and Tobago | 20 June 1974 |
| Republic of Venezuela (Note: Now the Bolivarian Republic of Venezuela.) | 28 June 1974 |
| Republic of Niger (Note: Diplomatic relations were restored on 19 August 1996. Diplomatic relations were severed by PRC on 19 July 1992 after Niger resumed diplomatic ties with the ROC on 30 June 1992.) | 20 July 1974 |
| Federative Republic of Brazil | 15 August 1974 |
| Republic of the Gambia (Note: Diplomatic relations were restored on 17 March 2016. Diplomatic relations were severed by PRC on 25 July 1995 after Gambia resumed diplomatic ties with the ROC on 13 July 1995.) | 14 December 1974 |
| Republic of Botswana | 6 January 1975 |
| (Europe) European Economic Community (Note: Succeeded by the European Union in 1993 and 2009.) | 6 May 1975 |
| Republic of the Philippines | 9 June 1975 |
| People's Republic of Mozambique (Note: Now the Republic of Mozambique.) | 25 June 1975 |
| Kingdom of Thailand | 1 July 1975 |
| Democratic Republic of São Tomé and Príncipe (Note: Diplomatic relations were restored on 26 December 2016. Diplomatic relations were severed by PRC on 11 July 1997 after São Tomé and Príncipe established diplomatic ties with the ROC on 6 May 1997.) | 12 July 1975 |
| People's Republic of Bangladesh | 4 October 1975 |
| Fiji (Note: Now the Republic of Fiji.) | 5 November 1975 |
| Independent State of Western Samoa (Note: Now the Independent State of Samoa.) | 6 November 1975 |
| State of the Comoros (Note: Now the Union of the Comoros.) | 13 November 1975 |
| Republic of Cape Verde | 25 April 1976 |
| Republic of Suriname | 28 May 1976 |
| Republic of Seychelles | 30 June 1976 |
| Independent State of Papua New Guinea | 12 October 1976 |
| Republic of Liberia (Note: Diplomatic relations were restored on 10 August 1993. Liberia resumed diplomatic ties with the ROC on 9 October 1989. Diplomatic relations with the PRC has been severed since 9 September 1997 because the Liberian Government's recognition of a "Two Chinas" Policy. However, the PRC and Liberia normalized their relations on 11 October 2003.) | 17 February 1977 |
| Hashemite Kingdom of Jordan | 7 April 1977 |
| Barbados | 30 May 1977 |
| Sultanate of Oman | 25 May 1978 |
| Socialist People's Libyan Arab Jamahiriya (Note: Now the State of Libya.) | 9 August 1978 |
| United States of America | 1 January 1979 |
| Republic of Djibouti | 8 January 1979 |
| Portuguese Republic | 8 February 1979 |
| Ireland | 22 June 1979 |

=== 1980s ===
| Country | Date |
|---|---|
| Republic of Ecuador | 2 January 1980 |
| Republic of Colombia | 7 February 1980 |
| Republic of Zimbabwe | 18 April 1980 |
| Republic of Kiribati (Note: Diplomatic relations were restored on 27 September 2019. Diplomatic relations were severed by the PRC on 29 November 2003 after Kiribati established diplomatic ties with the ROC on 7 November 2003.) | 25 June 1980 |
| Republic of Vanuatu | 26 March 1982 |
| Antigua and Barbuda | 1 January 1983 |
| People's Republic of Angola (Note: Now the Republic of Angola.) | 12 January 1983 |
| Republic of Côte d'Ivoire | 2 March 1983 |
| Kingdom of Lesotho (Note: Diplomatic relations were restored on 12 January 1994. Diplomatic relations were severed by PRC on 7 April 1990 after Lesotho resumed diplomatic ties with the ROC on 5 April 1990.) | 30 April 1983 |
| United Arab Emirates | 1 November 1984 |
| Republic of Bolivia (Note: Now the Plurinational State of Bolivia.) | 9 July 1985 |
| Grenada (Note: Diplomatic relations were restored on 20 January 2005. Diplomatic relations were severed by PRC on 7 August 1989 after Grenada established diplomatic ties with the ROC on 19 July 1989.) | 1 October 1985 |
| Republic of Nicaragua (Note: Diplomatic relations were restored on 10 December 2021. Diplomatic relations were severed by PRC on 9 November 1990 after Nicaragua resumed diplomatic ties with the ROC on 6 November 1990.) | 7 December 1985 |
| Belize (Note: Diplomatic relations were severed on 23 October 1989. Belize recognized the ROC on 11 October 1989.) | 6 February 1987 |
| Eastern Republic of Uruguay | 3 February 1988 |
| State of Qatar | 9 July 1988 |
| State of Palestine (Note: Relations by PLO from 22 March 1965.) | 20 November 1988 |
| State of Bahrain (Note: Now the Kingdom of Bahrain.) | 18 April 1989 |
| Federated States of Micronesia | 11 September 1989 |

=== 1990s ===
| Country | Date |
|---|---|
| Republic of Namibia | 22 March 1990 |
| Kingdom of Saudi Arabia | 21 July 1990 |
| Republic of Singapore | 3 October 1990 |
| Republic of the Marshall Islands (Note: Diplomatic relations were severed on 11 December 1998. Marshall Islands recognized the ROC on 20 November 1998.) | 16 November 1990 |
| Republic of Estonia | 11 September 1991 |
| Republic of Latvia | 12 September 1991 |
| Republic of Lithuania | 14 September 1991 |
| Brunei Darussalam | 30 September 1991 |
| Republic of Uzbekistan | 2 January 1992 |
| Republic of Kazakhstan | 3 January 1992 |
| Republic of Tajikistan | 4 January 1992 |
| Ukraine (Note: Recognition extended as the Ukrainian Soviet Socialist Republic from 2 October 1949. Ukraine is the legal successor of the Ukrainian SSR and in accordance to The Law of Ukraine on Succession of Ukraine, Ukraine continues all "rights and duties pursuant to international agreements of Union SSR which do not contradict the Constitution of Ukraine and interests of the Republic".) | 4 January 1992 |
| Republic of Kyrgyzstan (Note: Now the Kyrgyz Republic.) | 5 January 1992 |
| Turkmenistan | 6 January 1992 |
| Republic of Belarus (Note: Recognition extended as the Byelorussian Soviet Socialist Republic from 2 October 1949. Belarus is the legal successor of the Byelorussian SSR and in the Constitution Article 142: "Laws, decrees and other acts which were applied in the territory of the Republic of Belarus prior to the entry into force of the present Constitution shall apply in the particular parts thereof that are not contrary to the Constitution of the Republic of Belarus.") | 20 January 1992 |
| State of Israel | 24 January 1992 |
| Republic of Moldova | 30 January 1992 |
| Republic of Azerbaijan | 2 April 1992 |
| Republic of Armenia | 6 April 1992 |
| Federal Republic of Yugoslavia (Note: Now the Republic of Serbia.) | |
| Republic of Slovenia | 12 May 1992 |
| Republic of Croatia | 13 May 1992 |
| Republic of Georgia (Note: Now Georgia.) | 9 June 1992 |
| Republic of Korea (South Korea) | 24 August 1992 |
| State of Eritrea | 24 May 1993 |
| Republic of Macedonia (Note: Now the Republic of North Macedonia.) (Note: Diplomatic relations were restored on 18 June 2001. North Macedonia established diplomatic ties with the ROC on 27 January 1999.) | 12 October 1993 |
| Principality of Andorra | 29 June 1994 |
| Principality of Monaco (Note: Diplomatic relations were raised to ambassadorial level on 6 February 2006.) | 16 January 1995 |
| Republic of Bosnia and Herzegovina (Note: Now Bosnia and Herzegovina.) | 3 April 1995 |
| Commonwealth of the Bahamas | 23 May 1997 |
| Cook Islands | 25 July 1997 |
| Saint Lucia (Note: Diplomatic relations were severed on 5 May 2007. St. Lucia resumed diplomatic ties with the ROC on 30 April 2007.) | 1 September 1997 |
| Republic of South Africa | 1 January 1998 |
| Kingdom of Tonga | 2 November 1998 |

=== 2000s ===
| Country | Date |
|---|---|
| Democratic Republic of Timor-Leste | 20 May 2002 |
| Republic of Nauru (Note: Diplomatic relations were restored on 24 January 2024. Diplomatic relations were severed by the PRC on 31 May 2005 after Nauru resumed diplomatic ties with the ROC on 14 May 2005.) | 21 July 2002 |
| Commonwealth of Dominica | 31 March 2004 |
| Republic of Montenegro (Note: Now Montenegro.) | 6 July 2006 |
| Republic of Costa Rica | 1 June 2007 |
| Niue | 12 December 2007 |
| Republic of Malawi | 28 December 2007 |

=== 2010s ===
| Country | Date |
|---|---|
| Republic of South Sudan | 9 July 2011 |
| Republic of Panama | 13 June 2017 |
| Dominican Republic | 1 May 2018 |
| Republic of El Salvador | 21 August 2018 |
| Solomon Islands | 21 September 2019 |

=== 2020s ===
| Country | Date |
|---|---|
| Republic of Honduras | 26 March 2023 |

== See also ==
PRC

- Foreign relations of China

ROC

- Foreign relations of Taiwan
- Timeline of diplomatic relations of the Republic of China
