= Blue water thesis =

Decolonization approach

The blue water thesis or salt water thesis (as opposed to the "Belgian Thesis") was a limited decolonization approach arising from United Nations General Assembly Resolution 637, which linked self-determination with non-self-governing territories.

General Assembly resolution 637 (VII), adopted on 16 December 1952, recognized that “every Member of the United Nations, in conformity with the Charter, should respect the maintenance of the right of self-determination”. Belgium, which had given up its own colonial possessions under the new decolonization mandates, then further attempted to secure human rights and self-determination for native peoples, specifying the Native American peoples within the United States as a prominent example.

In response, nations including the United States pushed through the idea that, in order to be eligible for decolonization, the presence of "blue water" between the colony and the colonizing country – or, at minimum, a geographically discrete set of boundaries – was needed.

There is some confusion as to the use of the three terms, which are at times used interchangeably. This seems to arise from the original thesis, which was inclusive of indigenous peoples within independent states, but was later used to describe the counter-argument that separation was a decolonization prerequisite as nations who entirely consist of such territories can not decolonize.

Belgium took the lead in trying "to extend the obligations entered into by the UN members under Chapter XI to those parts of the metropolis inhabited by peoples whose degree of actual subordination to the rest of the state community in the midst of which they lived placed them in a 'colonial situation'." The "Belgium thesis" would have "extended the concept of 'Non-Self-Governing Territories' to include disenfranchised indigenous peoples living within the borders of independent states, especially if the race, language, and culture of these peoples differed from those of the dominant population." In doing so, Belgium was attempting to bring back 23(b) of the League of Nations Covenant “which bound members to 'secure just treatment of the native inhabitants of territories under their control'."

While recognizing that "the desire for independence is the rightful aspiration of peoples under colonial subjugation and that the denial of their right to self-determination constitutes a threat to the well-being of humanity and to international peace", the U.N. codified the assertions of the colonial powers that moved against Belgium's efforts to expand the official scope of self-determination and decolonization in U.N. General Assembly Resolution 1541 (XV).

Questions arising from the continuation, in practice, of the Salt Water Thesis include the following:

- Whether or not the entire premise of geographic separation as a determinant of decolonization is valid;
- Whether the conceptual framework requires updating in order to align with principles outlined in other U.N. documents, such as the Declaration on the rights of indigenous peoples, and
- How the Salt Water Doctrine applies to formerly considered colonial possessions such as Hawai'i which have been integrated into other nations and have been recognized as such by international law.
